= John Wesley =

English clergyman (1703–1791)

The Reverend John Wesley
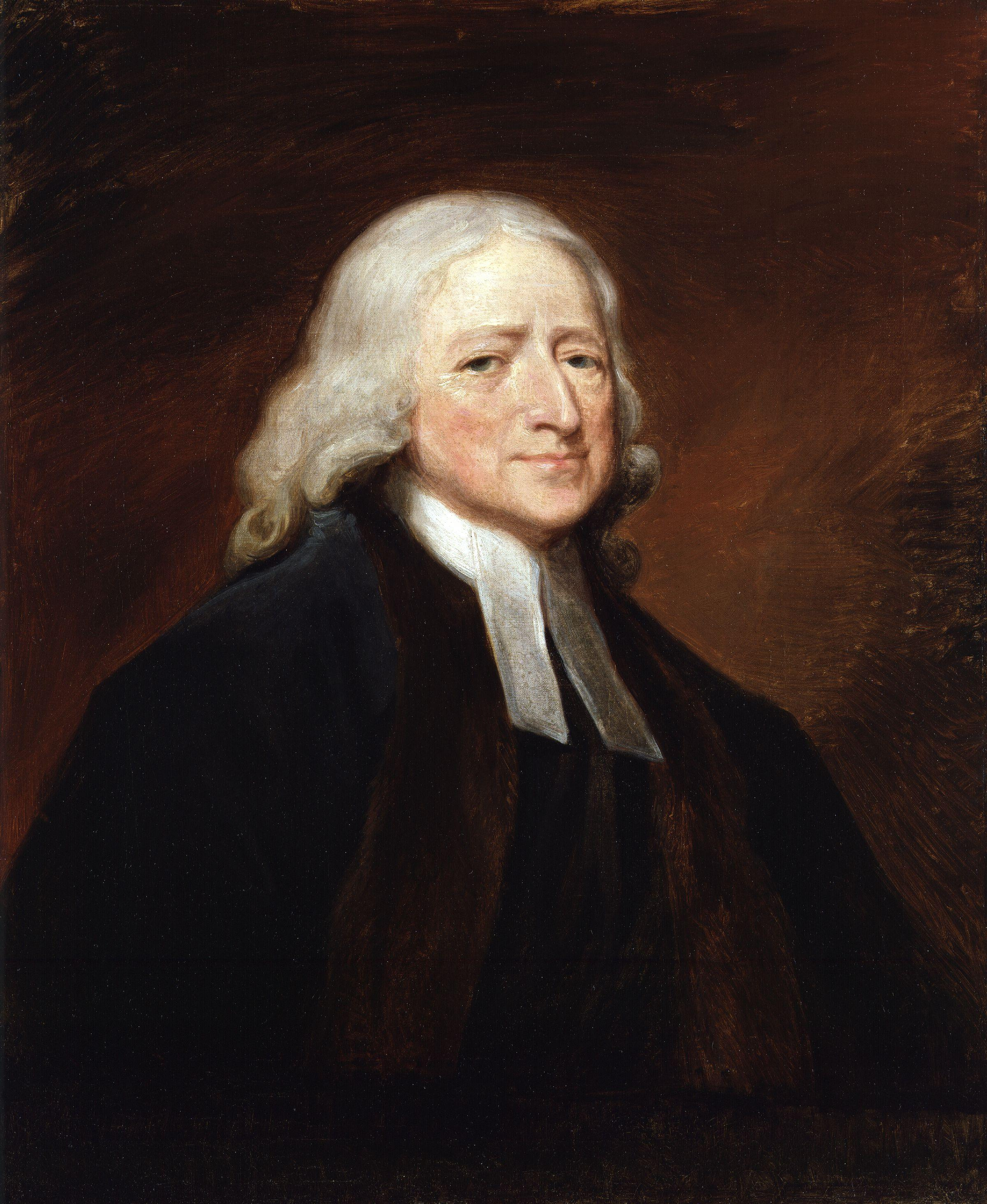
- Portrait by George Romney, c. 1789
- Born: 28 June [O.S. 17 June] 1703; Epworth, Lincolnshire, England
- Died: 2 March 1791 (aged 87); London, England
- Education: Christ Church, Oxford
- Occupations: Cleric; theologian; academic (Lincoln College, Oxford); author
- Spouse: Mary Vazeille (m. 1751; sep. 1758)
- Parents: Samuel Wesley (father); Susanna Wesley (mother)
- Relatives: Samuel Wesley (brother); Mehetabel Wesley Wright (sister); Charles Wesley (brother)

Ecclesiastical career
- Religion: Christian (Anglican / Methodist)
- Church: Church of England
- Ordained: 1725
- Offices held: President of the Methodist Conference
- Theology career
- Notable work: Articles of Religion; Explanatory Notes Upon the New Testament; Sermons on Several Occasions
- Theological work
- Language: English
- Tradition or movement: Methodism, Wesleyan–Arminianism
- Notable ideas: Imparted righteousness; Second work of grace; Wesleyan Quadrilateral

John Wesley (/ˈwɛsli/; (Note: Wesley himself pronounced his name as WESS-lee (/ˈwɛsli/), but in modern English it is often pronounced WEZ-lee (/ˈwɛzli/).) 28 June [O.S. 17 June] 1703 – 2 March 1791) was an English cleric, theologian, and evangelist who was a principal leader of a revival movement within the Church of England known as Methodism. The societies he founded became the dominant form of the ongoing independent Methodist movement.

Educated at Charterhouse and Christ Church, Oxford, Wesley was elected a fellow of Lincoln College, Oxford, in 1726 and ordained as an Anglican priest two years later. At Oxford, he led the "Holy Club", a society formed for the purpose of the study and the pursuit of a devout Christian life. After an unsuccessful two-year ministry in Savannah, Georgia, he returned to London and joined a religious society led by Moravian Christians. On 24 May 1738, he experienced what has come to be called his evangelical conversion. He left the Moravians and began his own ministry.

A key step in the development of Wesley's ministry was to travel widely and preach outdoors, embracing Arminian doctrines. Moving across Great Britain and Ireland, he helped form and organise small Christian groups that developed intensive and personal accountability, discipleship, and religious instruction. He appointed itinerant, unordained evangelists—both women and men—to care for these groups of people. Under Wesley's direction, Methodists became leaders in many social issues of the day, including the abolition of slavery and support for women preachers.

Although he was not a systematic theologian, Wesley argued against Calvinism and for the notion of Christian perfection, which he cited as the reason that he felt God "raised up" Methodists into existence. His evangelicalism, firmly grounded in sacramental theology, maintained that means of grace played a role in sanctification of the believer; however, he taught that it was by faith a believer was transformed into the likeness of Christ. He held that, in this life, Christians could achieve a state where the love of God "reigned supreme in their hearts", giving them not only outward but inward holiness. Wesley's teachings, collectively known as Wesleyan theology, continue to inform the doctrine of Methodist churches. In his early ministry years, Wesley was barred from preaching in many parish churches and the Methodists were persecuted; he later became widely respected, and by the end of his life, was described as "the best-loved man in England".

== Early life ==
John Wesley was born on 28 June [O.S. 17 June] 1703 in Epworth, 23 miles (37 km) north-west of Lincoln. He was the 15th child of Samuel Wesley and his wife Susanna Wesley (née Annesley). Samuel Wesley was a graduate of the University of Oxford and a poet who, from 1696, was rector of Epworth. He married Susanna, the 25th child of Samuel Annesley, a dissenting minister, in 1689. Ultimately, she bore 19 children, nine of whom lived beyond infancy. She and Samuel Wesley had become members of the Church of England as young adults.

Wesley's elder family

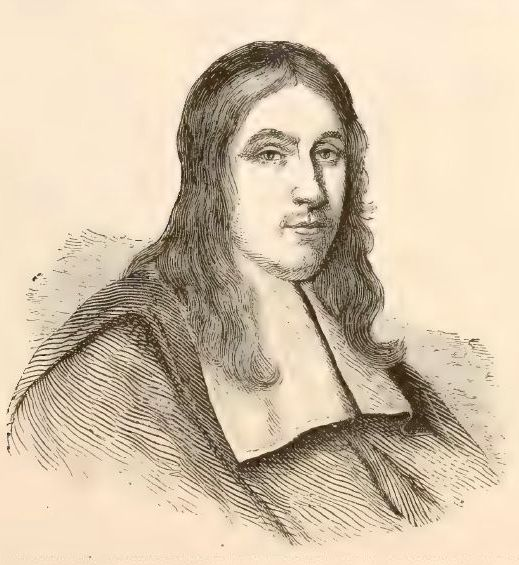
John Westley (Note: Last name has different spelling than his grandson, John Wesley: See John Westley article for source information)
grandfather, dissenting minister

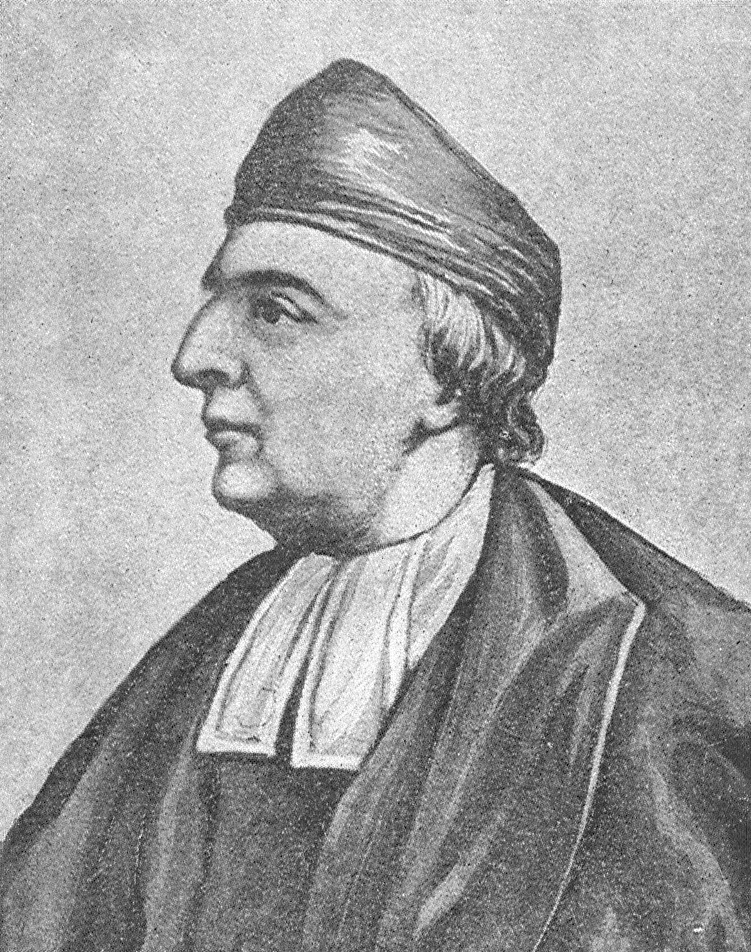
Samuel Wesley
father, poet

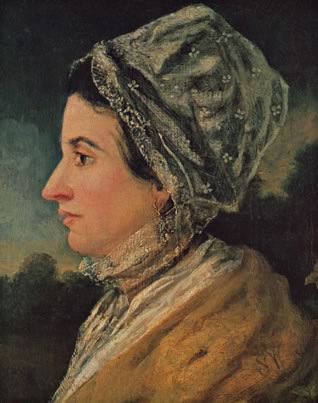
Susanna Wesley
mother

John Wesley's ancestry can be traced back to 14th-century England. The Wesley family was considered one of high respectability in southern England. In almost every generation there existed an eminent clergyman and accomplished scholar. The paternal grandfather of John and Charles Wesley was John Westley (1636–1678), an English dissenting minister, who was ordained in 1658 (the year of Oliver Cromwell's death) at Whitchurch, a small market town in Shropshire. At this time the Commonwealth had been vanquished, and with the re-establishment of the throne and the episcopal form of church government, Westley was regarded as one of Cromwell's Puritans. Subsequently, he was arrested by the State Church officers, and carried to prison at Blandford. Because of his amiable character and gentle nature, his sentence was commuted and was allowed to return to his parish.

As in many families at the time, Wesley's parents gave their children their early education. Each child, including the girls, was taught to read as soon as they turned five years old. They were expected to become proficient in Latin and Greek and to have learned major portions of the New Testament by heart. Susanna Wesley examined each child before the midday meal and before evening prayers. The children were not allowed to eat between meals and were interviewed singly by their mother one evening each week for the purpose of intensive spiritual instruction. In 1714, at age 11, Wesley was sent to the Charterhouse School in London (under the mastership of John King from 1715), where he lived the studious, methodical and, for a while, religious life in which he had been trained at home.

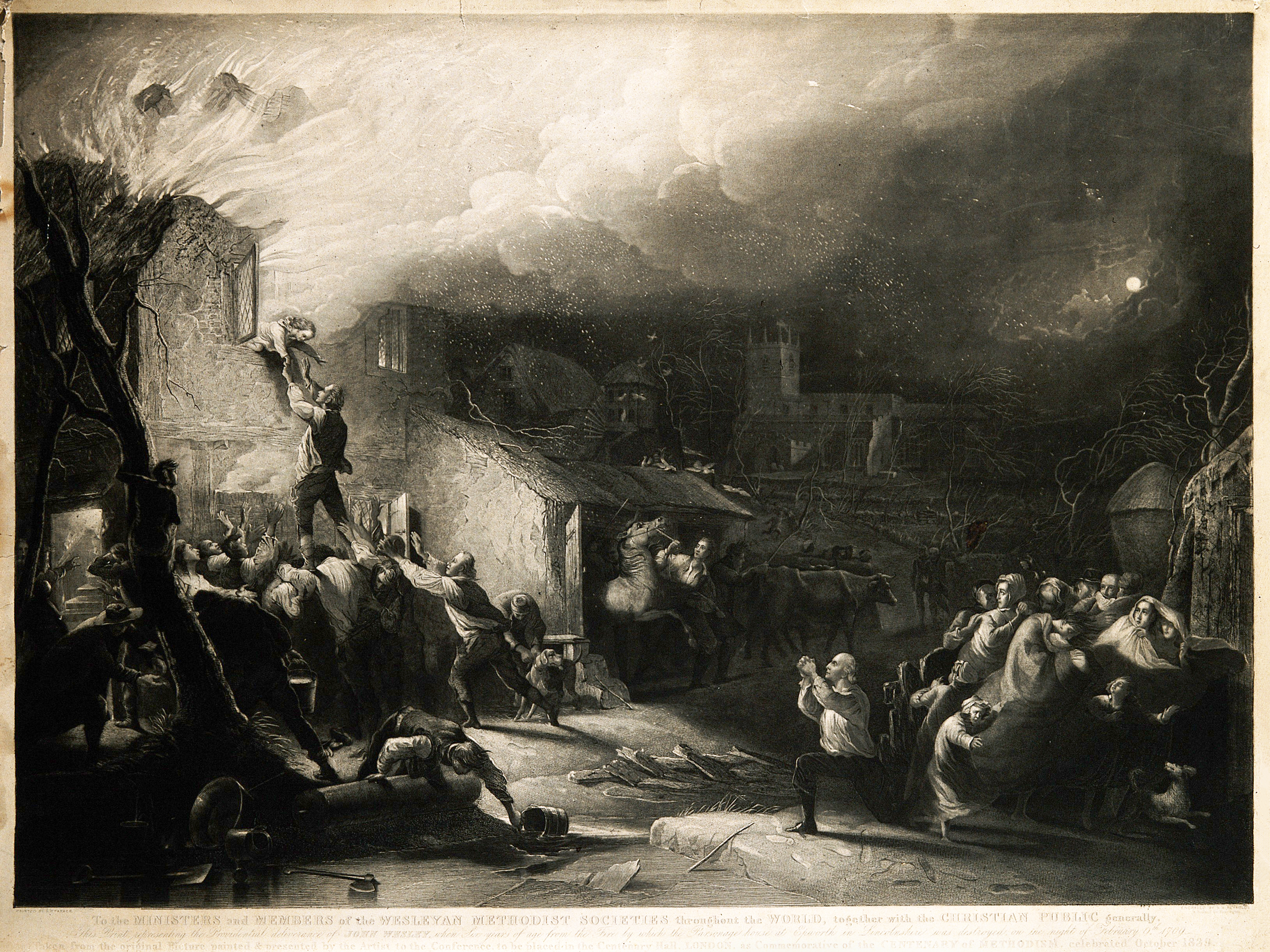
The rescue of the young John Wesley from the burning rectory. Mezzotint by Samuel William Reynolds.

Apart from his disciplined upbringing, a rectory fire which occurred on 9 February 1709, when Wesley was five years old, left an indelible impression. Some time after 11:00 pm, the rectory roof caught on fire. Sparks falling on the children's beds and cries of "fire" from the street roused the Wesleys who managed to shepherd all their children out of the house except for John who was left stranded on an upper floor. With stairs aflame and the roof about to collapse, Wesley was lifted out of a window by a parishioner standing on another man's shoulders. This childhood deliverance subsequently became part of the Wesley legend, attesting to his special destiny and extraordinary work. Wesley was also influenced by the reported haunting of Epworth Rectory between 1716 and 1717. The Wesley family reported frequently hearing noises and occasionally seeing apparitions which they believed were caused by a ghost called 'Old Jeffery'.

== Education ==
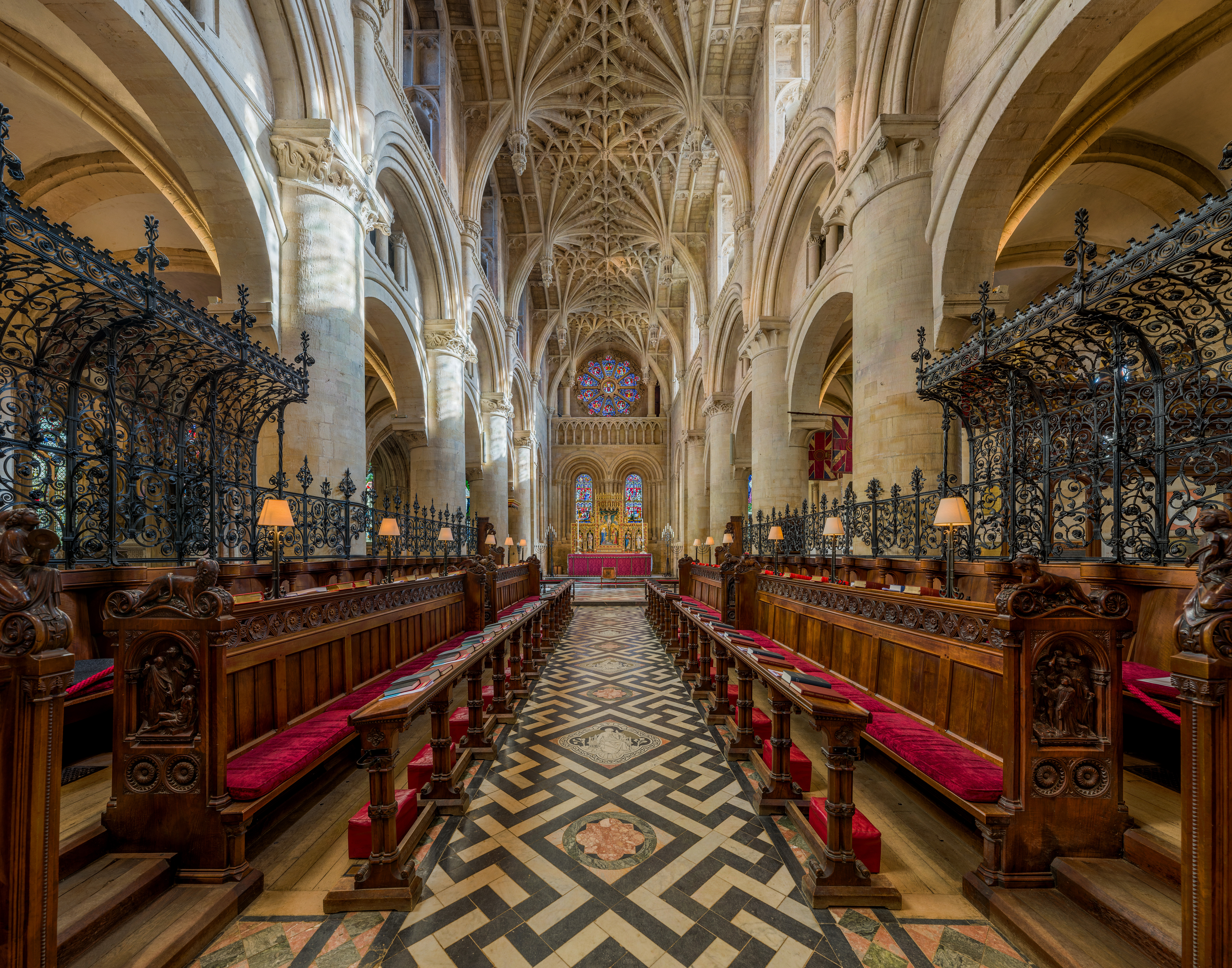
Christ Church, cathedral of the Diocese of Oxford, Wesley's college chapel and place of ordination

In June 1720, Wesley entered Christ Church, Oxford. After graduating in 1724, Wesley stayed on at Christ Church to study for his master's degree.

He was ordained a deacon on 19 September 1725—holy orders being a necessary step toward becoming a fellow and tutor at the university. On 17 March 1726, Wesley was unanimously elected a fellow of Lincoln College, Oxford; this carried with it the right to a room at the college and regular salary. While continuing his studies, he taught Greek and philosophy, lectured on the New Testament and moderated daily disputations at the university. However, a call to ministry intruded upon his academic career. In August 1727, after completing his master's degree, Wesley returned to Epworth. His father had requested his assistance in serving the neighbouring cure of Wroot. Ordained a priest on 22 September 1728, Wesley served as a parish curate for two years.

In the year of his ordination, he read Thomas à Kempis and Jeremy Taylor, showed his interest in mysticism, and began to seek the religious truths which underlay the great revival of the 18th century. The reading of William Law's Christian Perfection and A Serious Call to a Devout and Holy Life gave him, he said, a more sublime view of the law of God; and he resolved to keep it, inwardly and outwardly, as sacredly as possible, believing that in obedience he would find salvation. He pursued a rigidly methodical and abstemious life, studied Scripture, and performed his religious duties diligently, depriving himself so that he would have alms to give. He began to seek after holiness of heart and life.

Wesley returned to Oxford in November 1729 at the request of the Rector of Lincoln College and to maintain his status as a junior fellow.

== Holy Club ==
During Wesley's absence from Oxford, his younger brother Charles (1707–88) matriculated at Christ Church; along with two fellow students, he formed a small club for the purpose of study and the pursuit of a devout Christian life. On Wesley's return, he became the leader of the group which increased somewhat in number and greatly in commitment. The group met daily from six until nine for prayer, psalms, and reading of the Greek New Testament. They prayed every waking hour for several minutes and each day for a special virtue. While the church's prescribed attendance was only three times a year, they took Communion every Sunday. They fasted on Wednesdays and Fridays until nones (3:00 pm) as was commonly observed in the ancient church. In 1730, the group began the practice of visiting prisoners in gaol. The men preached, educated, and relieved gaoled debtors whenever possible, and cared for the sick.

Given the low ebb of spirituality in Oxford at that time, Wesley's group provoked a negative reaction. They were considered to be religious "enthusiasts", which in the context of the time meant religious fanatics. University wits styled them the "Holy Club", a title of derision. Currents of opposition became a furore following the mental breakdown and death of a group member, William Morgan. In response to the charge that "rigorous fasting" had hastened his death, Wesley noted that Morgan had left off fasting a year and a half since. In the same letter, which was widely circulated, Wesley referred to the name "Methodist" with which "some of our neighbors are pleased to compliment us". That name was used by an anonymous author in a published pamphlet (1732) describing Wesley and his group, "The Oxford Methodists". This ministry, however, was not without controversy. The Holy Club ministered and maintained support for Thomas Blair who in 1732 was found guilty of sodomy. Blair was notorious among the townspeople and his fellow prisoners, and Wesley continued to support him.

For all of his outward piety, Wesley sought to cultivate his inner holiness or at least his sincerity as evidence of being a true Christian. A list of "General Questions" which he developed in 1730 evolved into an elaborate grid by 1734 in which he recorded his daily activities hour-by-hour, resolutions he had broken or kept, and ranked his hourly "temper of devotion" on a scale of 1 to 9. Wesley also regarded the contempt with which he and his group were held to be a mark of a true Christian. As he put it in a letter to his father, "Till he be thus contemned, no man is in a state of salvation."

== Journey to Savannah, Georgia ==
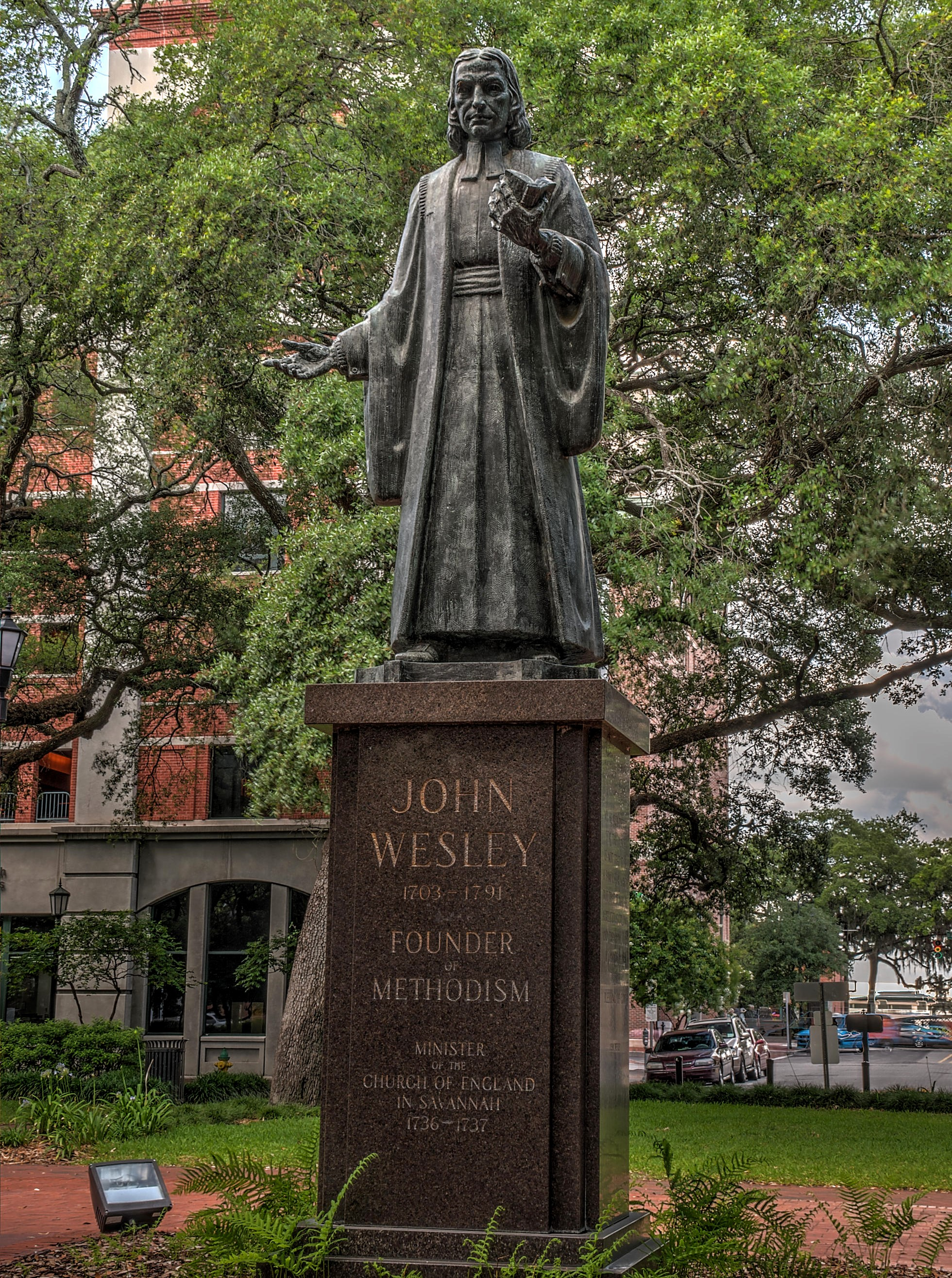
Statue of Wesley in Savannah, Georgia, United States

On 14 October 1735, Wesley and his brother Charles sailed on The Simmonds from Gravesend in Kent for Savannah in the Province of Georgia in the American colonies at the request of James Oglethorpe, who had founded the colony in 1733 on behalf of the Trustees for the Establishment of the Colony of Georgia in America. Oglethorpe wanted Wesley to be the minister of the newly formed Savannah parish, a new town laid out in accordance with the famous Oglethorpe Plan.

It was on the voyage to the colonies that the Wesleys first came into contact with Moravian settlers. Wesley was influenced by their deep faith and spirituality rooted in pietism. At one point in the voyage, a storm came up and broke the mast off the ship. While the English panicked, the Moravians calmly sang hymns and prayed. This experience led Wesley to believe that the Moravians possessed an inner strength which he lacked. The deeply personal religion that the Moravian pietists practised heavily influenced Wesley and is reflected in his theology of Methodism.

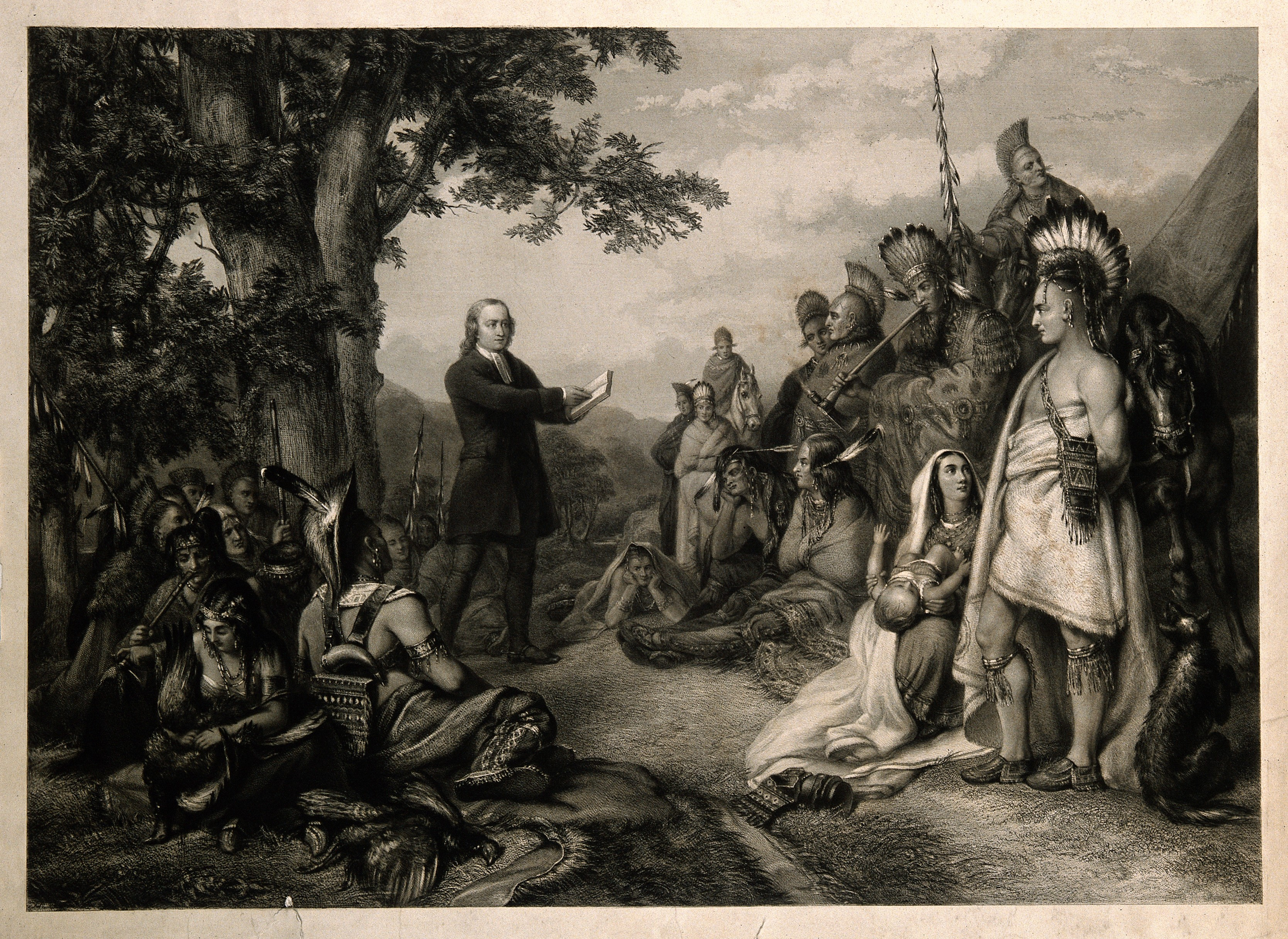
An engraving, usually titled John Wesley preaching to the Indians, artist unattributed

Wesley arrived in the colony in February 1736, and lived for a year at the parsonage that stood on the site of today's Oliver Sturges House. He approached the Georgia mission as a High churchman, seeing it as an opportunity to revive "primitive Christianity" in a primitive environment. Although his primary goal was to evangelise the Native American people, a shortage of clergy in the colony largely limited his ministry to European settlers in Savannah and he was replaced by William Norris. While his ministry has often been judged to have been a failure in comparison to his later success as a leader in the Evangelical Revival, Wesley gathered around him a group of devoted Christians, who met in a number of small-group religious societies. At the same time, attendance at Communion increased over the course of nearly two years in which he served as Christ Church's parish priest.

Nonetheless, Wesley's High Church ministry was controversial among the colonists and it ended in disappointment after Wesley fell in love with a young woman named Sophia (or Sophy) Hopkey. He hesitated to marry her because he felt that his first priority in Georgia was to be a missionary to the Native Americans, and he was interested in the practice of clerical celibacy within early Christianity. Following her marriage to William Williamson, Wesley believed Sophia's former zeal for practising the Christian faith declined. In strictly applying the rubrics of the Book of Common Prayer, Wesley denied her Communion after she failed to signify to him in advance her intention of taking it. As a result, legal proceedings against him ensued in which a clear resolution seemed unlikely. On 22 December 1737, Wesley fled the colony and returned to England.

One of the most significant accomplishments of Wesley's Georgia mission was his publication of a Collection of Psalms and Hymns. The Collection was the first Anglican hymnal published in America, and the first of many hymn books Wesley published. It included five hymns he translated from German.

== Wesley's "Aldersgate experience" ==
Aldersgate memorials

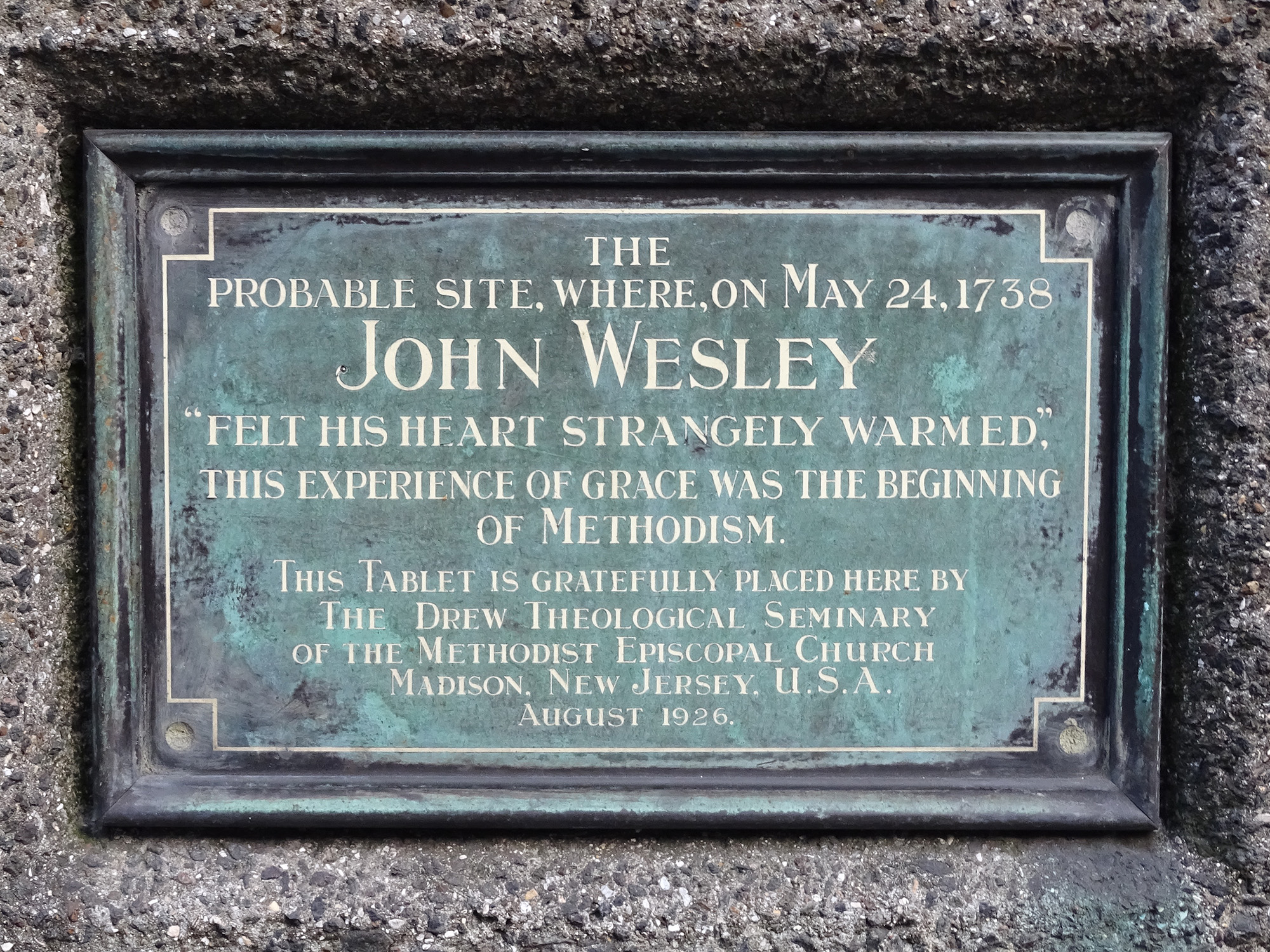
Plaque erected in August 1926 at the probable site of the Aldersgate experience by the Drew Theological Seminary of the Methodist Episcopal Church

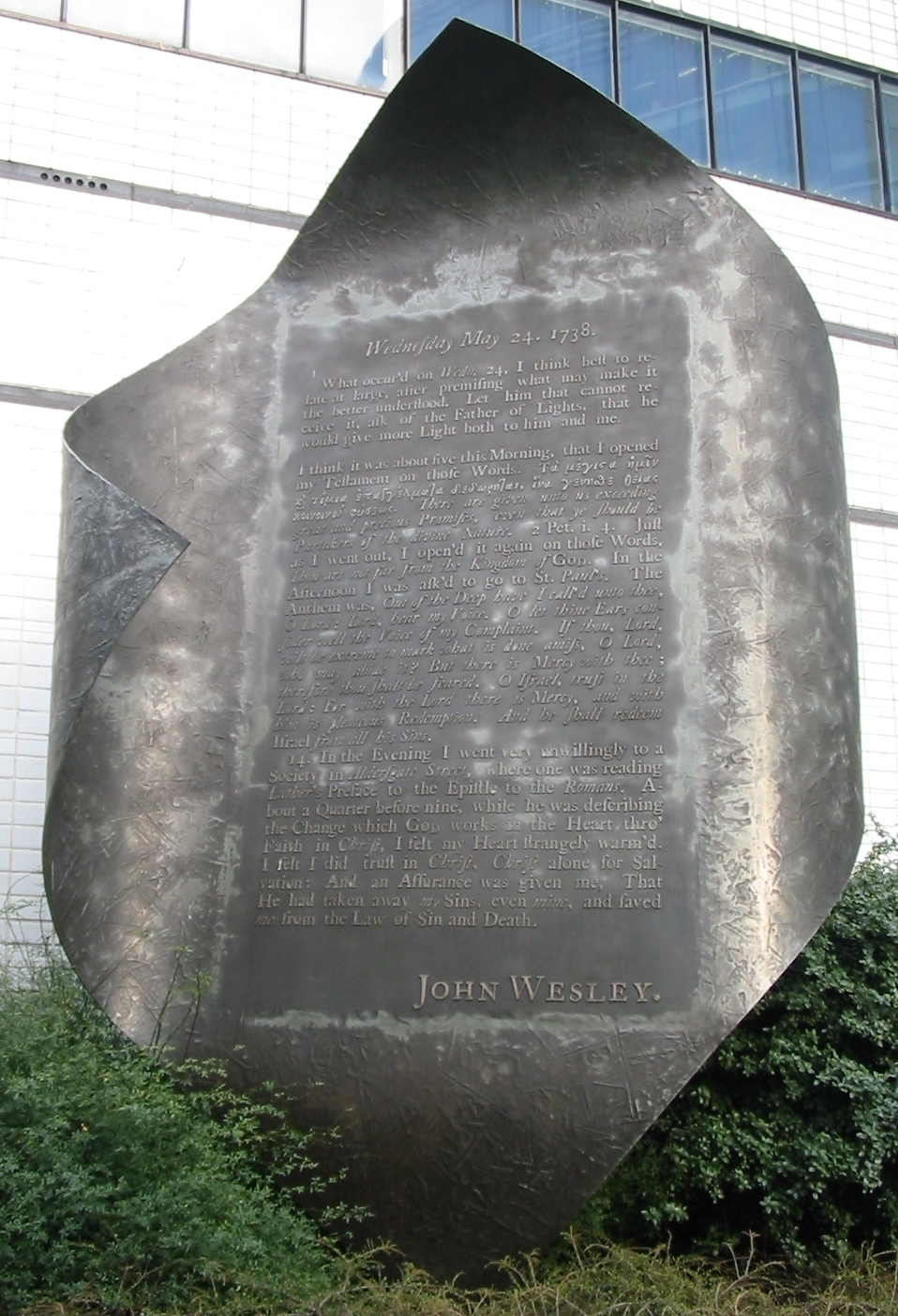
The "Aldersgate Flame" commemorates the event and features text from Wesley's journal describing his experience.

As a result of his experience in Georgia, Wesley became depressed. While on his voyage home to England, he had the opportunity to think about his own religious faith. He found that, although he had committed to the life of following Christ, he was dissatisfied with his spiritual soundness and felt inadequate to preach, especially after witnessing the confident way in which the Moravians had preached their faith. Both he and Charles received counsel from Moravian minister Peter Boehler, who was temporarily in England awaiting permission to depart for Georgia himself. Boehler encouraged Wesley to "preach faith until you have it".

Wesley's noted "Aldersgate experience" of 24 May 1738, at a Moravian meeting in Aldersgate Street, London, in which he heard a reading of Martin Luther's preface to the Epistle to the Romans, revolutionised the character and method of his ministry. The previous week he had been highly impressed by the sermon of John Heylyn, whom he was assisting in the service at St Mary le Strand. Earlier that day, he had heard the choir at St Paul's Cathedral singing Psalm 130, where the Psalmist calls to God "Out of the depths."

But it was still a depressed Wesley who attended a service on the evening of 24 May. Wesley recounted his Aldersgate experience in his journal:

"In the evening I went very unwillingly to a society in Aldersgate Street, where one was reading Luther's Preface to the Epistle to the Romans. About a quarter before nine, while he was describing the change which God works in the heart through faith in Christ, I felt my heart strangely warmed. I felt I did trust in Christ, Christ alone for salvation, and an assurance was given me that he had taken away my sins, even mine, and saved me from the law of sin and death."

A few weeks later, Wesley preached a sermon on the doctrine of personal salvation by faith, which was followed by another, on God's grace "free in all, and free for all." Considered a pivotal moment, Daniel L. Burnett writes: "The significance of Wesley's Aldersgate Experience is monumental ... Without it, the names of Wesley and Methodism would likely be nothing more than obscure footnotes in the pages of church history." Burnett describes this event as Wesley's "Evangelical Conversion". 24 May is commemorated in Methodist churches as Aldersgate Day.

== After Aldersgate: Working with the Moravians ==
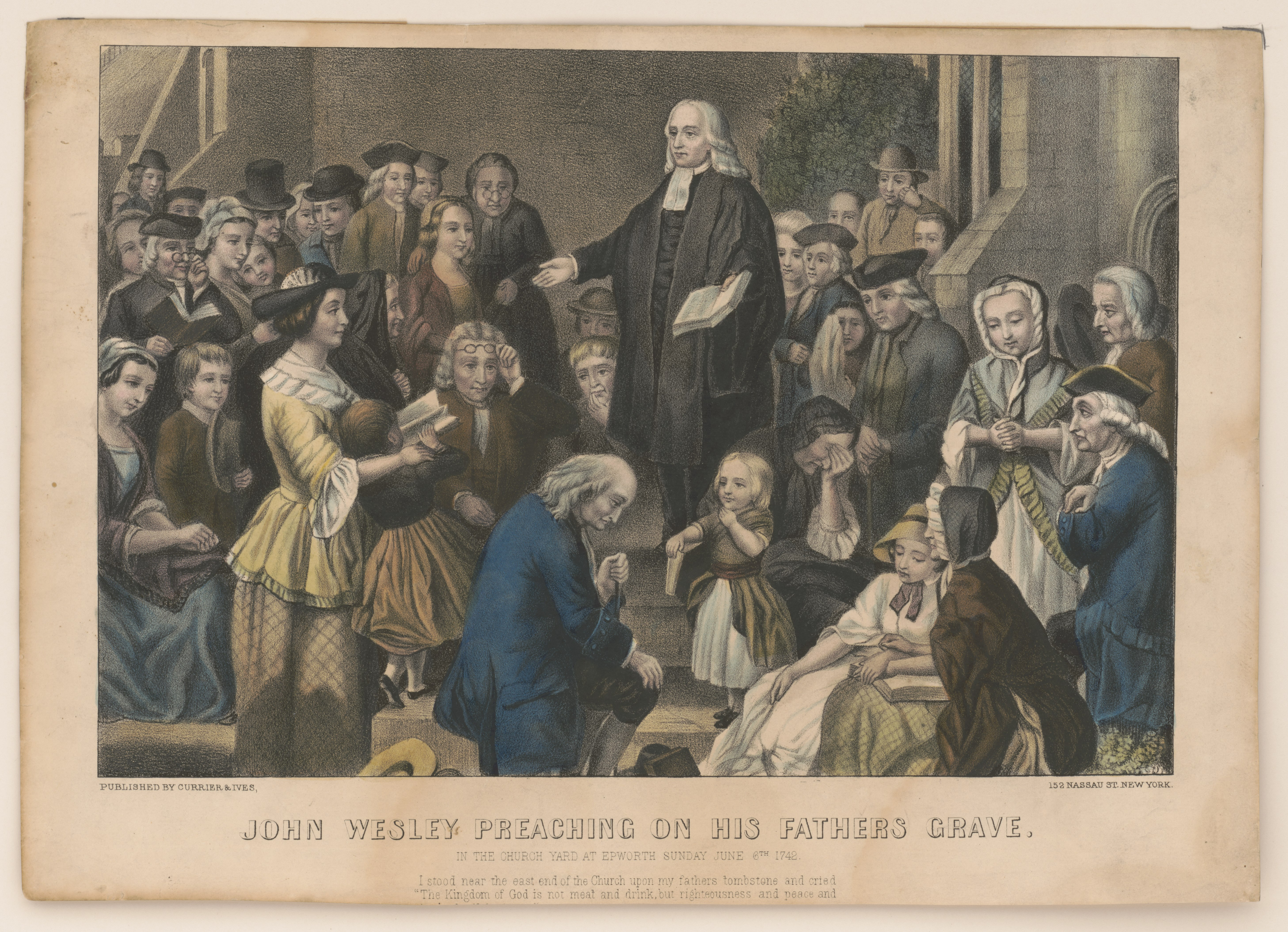
When forbidden from preaching from the pulpits of parish churches, Wesley began open-air preaching.

Wesley allied himself with the Moravian society in Fetter Lane. In August 1738 Wesley travelled to Germany, specifically to see Herrnhut in Saxony, as he wished to study at the Moravian headquarters there. On his return to England, Wesley drew up rules for the "bands" into which the Fetter Lane Society was divided and published a collection of hymns for them. He met frequently with this and other religious societies in London but did not preach often in 1738, because most of the parish churches were closed to him.

Wesley's Oxford friend, the evangelist George Whitefield, was also excluded from the churches of Bristol upon his return from America. When Wesley reached Bristol, the city was booming with new industrial and commercial development. Because of this, there were social uproars with riots and religious troubles. About a fifth of the population were Dissenters, while many of the Anglicans possessed a religious enthusiasm that made them receptive to Wesley's message and approach. Going to the neighbouring village of Kingswood, in February 1739, Whitefield preached in the open air to a company of miners. Wesley hesitated to accept Whitefield's call to copy this bold step. Overcoming his scruples, he preached the first time at Whitefield's invitation a sermon in the open air, at a brickyard, near St Philip's Marsh, on 2 April 1739. Wesley wrote,

I could scarce reconcile myself to this strange way of preaching in the fields, of which he [Whitefield] set me an example on Sunday; having been all my life till very lately so tenacious of every point relating to decency and order, that I should have thought the saving of souls almost a sin if it had not been done in a church.

Wesley was unhappy about the idea of field preaching as he believed Anglican liturgy had much to offer in its practice. Earlier in his life he would have thought that such a method of saving souls was "almost a sin." He recognised the open-air services were successful in reaching men and women who would not enter most churches. From then on he took the opportunities to preach wherever an assembly could be brought together, more than once using his father's tombstone at Epworth as a pulpit. Wesley preached to create repentance, prayed for conversion, dealt with hysterical behaviour, and preached to upwards of thousands through field preaching. Wesley continued for fifty years—entering churches when he was invited, and taking his stand in the fields, in halls, cottages, and chapels, when the churches would not receive him.

Late in 1739, Wesley broke with the Moravians in London. Wesley had helped them organise the Fetter Lane Society, and those converted by his preaching and that of his brother and Whitefield had become members of their bands. But he believed they fell into heresy by supporting quietism, so he decided to form his own followers into a separate society. "Thus," he wrote, "without any previous plan, began the Methodist Society in England." He soon formed similar societies in Bristol and Kingswood, and Wesley and his friends made converts wherever they went.

== Persecutions and lay preaching ==
From 1739 onward, Wesley and the Methodists were persecuted by clergy and religious magistrates for various reasons. Though Wesley had been ordained an Anglican priest, many other Methodist leaders had not received ordination. And for his own part, Wesley flouted many regulations of the Church of England concerning parish boundaries and who had the authority to preach. This was seen as a social threat that disregarded institutions. Clergy attacked them in sermons and in print, and at times mobs attacked them. Wesley and his followers continued to work among the neglected and needy. They were denounced as promulgators of strange doctrines, fomenters of religious disturbances; as blind fanatics, leading people astray, claiming miraculous gifts, attacking the clergy of the Church of England, and trying to re-establish Catholicism.

Wesley felt that the church failed to call sinners to repentance, that many of the clergy were corrupt, and that people were perishing in their sins. He believed he was commissioned by God to bring about revival in the church, and no opposition, persecution, or obstacles could prevail against the divine urgency and authority of this commission. The prejudices of his High-church training, his strict notions of the methods and proprieties of public worship, his views of the apostolic succession and the prerogatives of the priest, even his most cherished convictions, were not allowed to stand in the way.

Seeing that he and the few clergy cooperating with him could not do the work that needed to be done, Wesley was led, as early as 1739, to approve local (lay) preachers. He evaluated and approved men who were not ordained by the Anglican Church to preach and do pastoral work. This expansion of lay preachers was one of the keys to the growth of Methodism.

== Chapels and organisations ==
The first Methodist chapel, called "The Foundery"

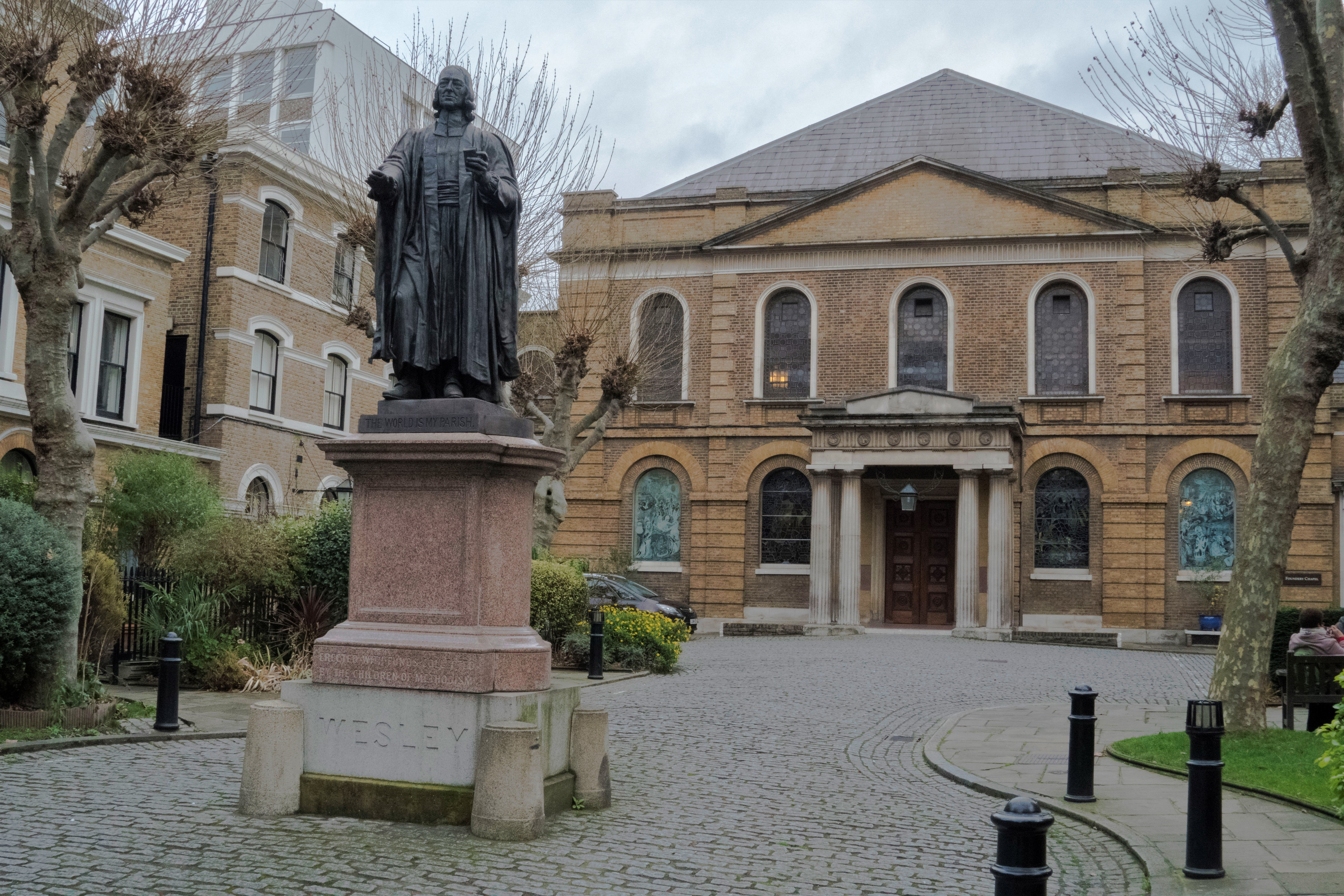
Wesley's Chapel, originally known as "City Road Chapel"

As his societies needed houses to worship in, Wesley began to provide chapels, first in Bristol at the New Room, then in London (first The Foundery and then Wesley's Chapel) and elsewhere. The Foundery was an early chapel used by Wesley. The location of the Foundery is shown on an 18th-century map, where it rests between Tabernacle Street and Worship Street in the Moorfields area of London. When the Wesleys spotted the building atop Windmill Hill, north of Finsbury Fields, the structure which previously cast brass guns and mortars for the Royal Ordnance had been sitting vacant for 23 years; it had been abandoned because of an explosion on 10 May 1716.

The Bristol chapel (built in 1739) was at first in the hands of trustees. A large debt was contracted, and Wesley's friends urged him to keep it under his own control, so the deed was cancelled and he became sole trustee. Following this precedent, all Methodist chapels were committed in trust to him until by a "deed of declaration", all his interests in them were transferred to a body of preachers called the "Legal Hundred".

When disorder arose among some members of the societies, Wesley adopted giving tickets to members, with their names written by his own hand. These were renewed every three months. Those deemed unworthy did not receive new tickets and dropped out of the society without disturbance. The tickets were regarded as commendatory letters.

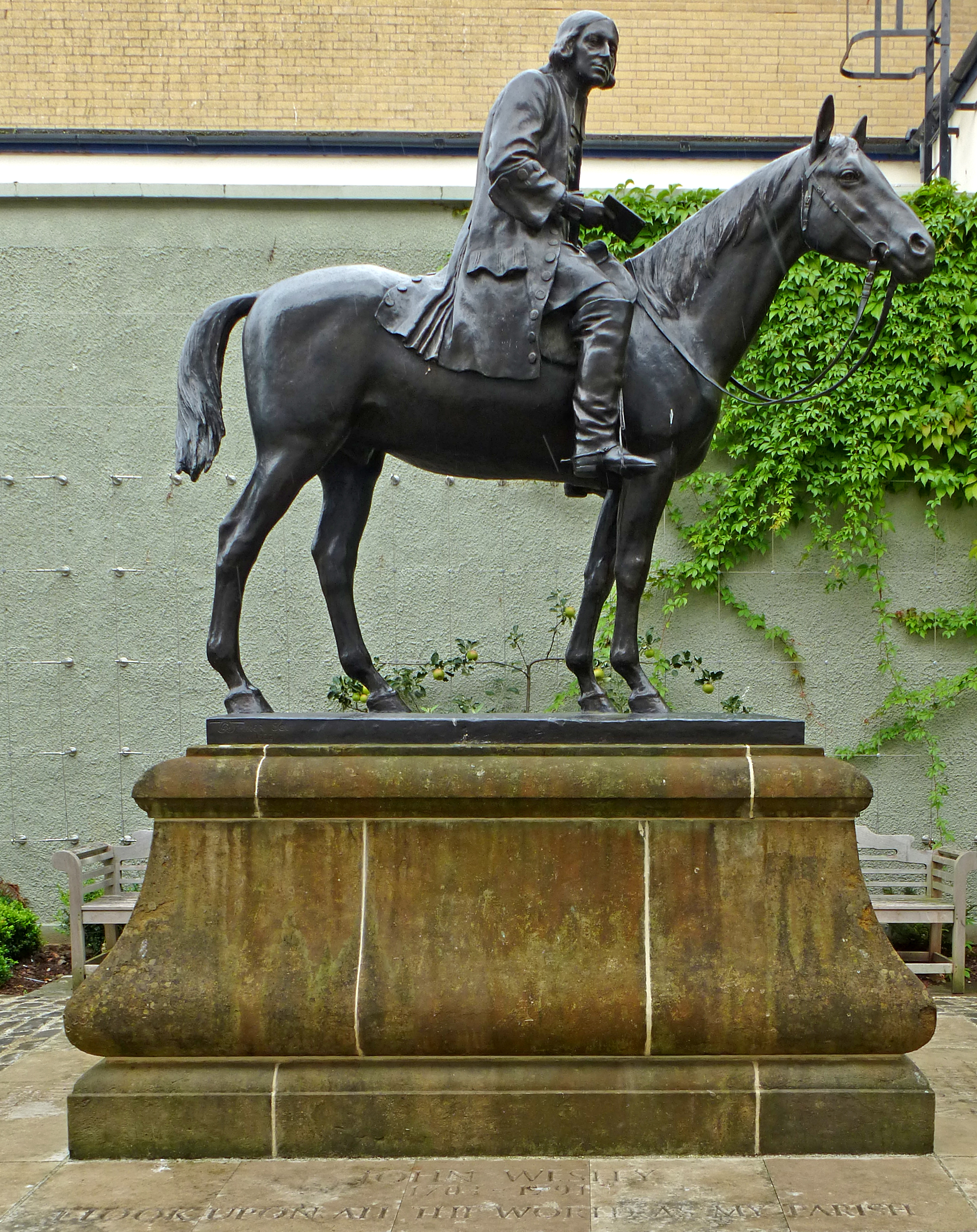
Statue of Wesley on horseback, by A. G. Walker, in the courtyard of the "New Room" chapel in Bristol. Bristol was Wesley's base for much of the 1740s and 1750s.

When the debt on a chapel became a burden, it was proposed that one in 12 members should collect offerings regularly from the 11 allotted to him. Out of this grew the Methodist class-meeting system in 1742. To keep the disorderly out of the societies, Wesley established a probationary system. He undertook to visit each society regularly in what became the quarterly visitation, or conference. As the number of societies increased, Wesley could not keep personal contact, so in 1743 he drew up a set of "General Rules" for the "United Societies". These were the nucleus of the Methodist Discipline, still the basis of modern Methodism.

Wesley laid the foundations of what now constitutes the organisation of the Methodist Church. Over time, a shifting pattern of societies, circuits, quarterly meetings, annual conferences, classes, bands, and select societies took shape. At the local level, there were numerous societies of different sizes which were grouped into circuits to which travelling preachers were appointed for two-year periods. Circuit officials met quarterly under a senior travelling preacher or "assistant." Conferences with Wesley, travelling preachers and others were convened annually for the purpose of co-ordinating doctrine and discipline for the entire connection. Classes of a dozen or so society members under a leader met weekly for spiritual fellowship and guidance. In the early years, there were "bands" of the spiritually gifted who consciously pursued perfection. Those who were regarded to have achieved it were grouped in select societies or bands. In 1744, there were 77 such members. There also was a category of penitents which consisted of backsliders.

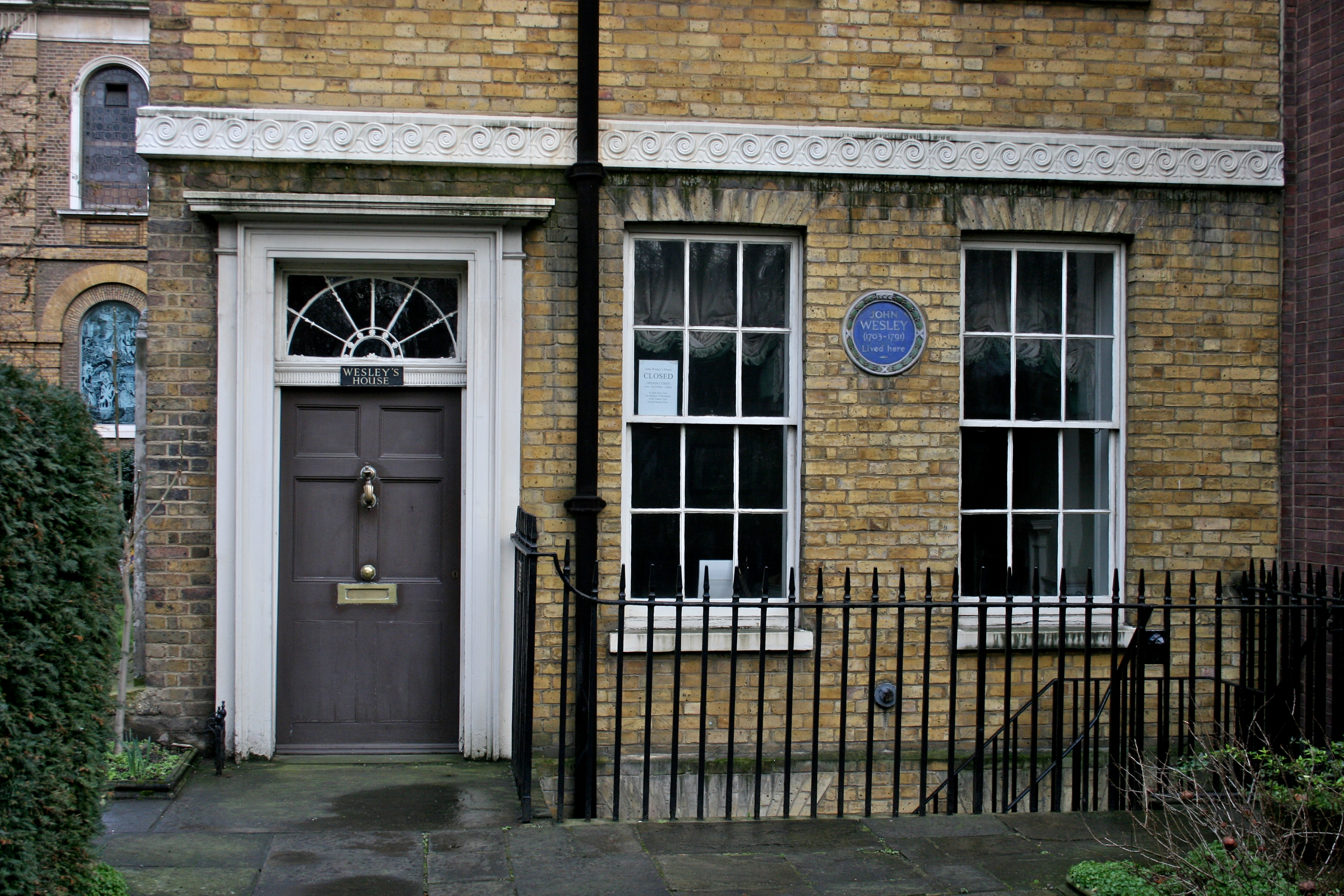
Wesley's house, next to Wesley's Chapel, City Road, London

As the number of preachers and preaching-houses increased, doctrinal and administrative matters needed to be discussed; so John and Charles Wesley, along with four other clergy and four lay preachers, met for consultation in London in 1744. This was the first Methodist conference; subsequently, the Conference (with Wesley as its president) became the ruling body of the Methodist movement. Two years later, to help preachers work more systematically and societies receive services more regularly, Wesley appointed "helpers" to definitive circuits. Each circuit included at least 30 appointments a month. Believing that the preacher's efficiency was promoted by his being changed from one circuit to another every year or two, Wesley established the "itinerancy" and insisted that his preachers submit to its rules.

John Wesley had strong links with the North West of England, visiting Manchester on at least fifteen occasions between 1733 and 1790. In 1733 and 1738 he preached at St Ann's Church and Salford Chapel, meeting with his friend John Clayton. In 1781 Wesley opened the chapel on Oldham Street—part of the Manchester and Salford Wesleyan Methodist Mission, now the site of Manchester's Methodist Central Hall.

Wesley travelled to Ireland for the first time in 1747 and continued through 1789. He rejected the Catholic Church, so he worked to convert the people of Ireland to Methodism. Overall, the numbers grew to over 15,000 by 1795.

Following an illness in 1748 Wesley was nursed by a class leader and housekeeper, Grace Murray, at an orphan house in Newcastle. Taken with Grace, he invited her to travel with him to Ireland in 1749 where he believed them to be betrothed though they were never married. It has been suggested that his brother Charles Wesley objected to the engagement, though this is disputed. Subsequently, Grace married John Bennett, a preacher.

== Ordination of ministers ==
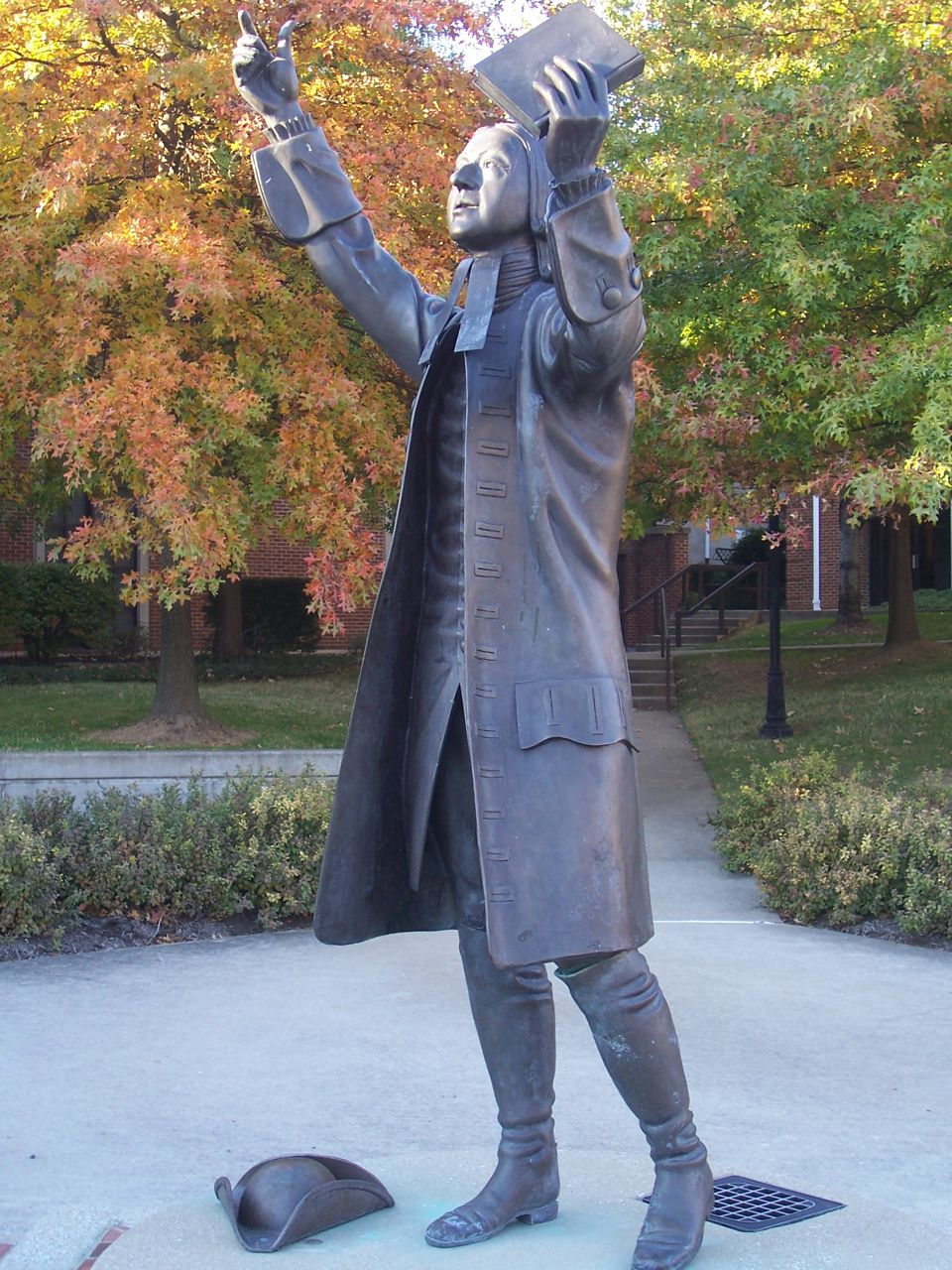
Life-size statue at Asbury Theological Seminary in Wilmore, Kentucky, United States

As the societies multiplied, they adopted the elements of an ecclesiastical system. The divide between Wesley and the Church of England widened. The question of division from the Church of England was urged by some of his preachers and societies, but most strenuously opposed by his brother Charles. Wesley refused to leave the Church of England, believing that Anglicanism was "with all her blemishes, [...] nearer the Scriptural plans than any other in Europe". In 1745 Wesley wrote that he would make any concession which his conscience permitted, to live in peace with the clergy. He could not give up the doctrine of an inward and present salvation by faith itself; he would not stop preaching, nor dissolve the societies, nor end preaching by lay members. In the same year, in correspondence with a friend, he wrote that he believed it wrong to administer sacraments without having been ordained by a bishop.

When, in 1746, Wesley read Lord King's account of the primitive church, he became convinced that apostolic succession could be transmitted through not only bishops, but also presbyters (priests). He wrote that he was "a scriptural episkopos as much as many men in England." Although he believed in apostolic succession, he also once called the idea of uninterrupted succession a "fable".

Edward Stillingfleet's Irenicon led him to decide that ordination (and holy orders) could be valid when performed by a presbyter rather than a bishop. Nevertheless, some believe that Wesley was secretly consecrated a bishop in 1763 by Erasmus of Arcadia, and that Wesley could not openly announce his episcopal consecration without incurring the penalty of the Præmunire Act.

In 1784, he believed he could no longer wait for the Bishop of London to ordain someone for the American Methodists, who were without the sacraments after the American War of Independence. The Church of England had been disestablished in the United States, where it had been the state church in most of the southern colonies. The Church of England had not yet appointed a United States bishop to what would become the Protestant Episcopal Church in America. Wesley ordained Thomas Coke as superintendent of Methodists in the United States by the laying on of hands, although Coke was already a priest in the Church of England. He also ordained Richard Whatcoat and Thomas Vasey as presbyters; Whatcoat and Vasey sailed to America with Coke. Wesley intended that Coke and Francis Asbury (whom Coke ordained as superintendent by direction of Wesley) should ordain others in the newly founded Methodist Episcopal Church in the United States. In 1787, Coke and Asbury persuaded the American Methodists to refer to them as bishops rather than superintendents, overruling Wesley's objections.

His brother, Charles, was alarmed by the ordinations and Wesley's evolving view of the matter. He begged Wesley to stop before he had "quite broken down the bridge" and not embitter his [Charles'] last moments on earth, nor "leave an indelible blot on our memory." Wesley replied that he had not separated from the church, nor did he intend to, but he must and would save as many souls as he could while alive, "without being careful about what may possibly be when I die." Although Wesley rejoiced that the Methodists in America were free, he advised his English followers to remain in the established church.

== Doctrines, theology and advocacy ==
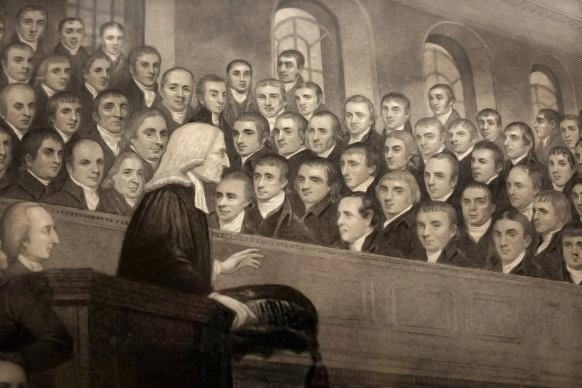
Wesley preaching to his assistants in the City Road Chapel (now Wesley's Chapel), London. Detail of a stipple engraving by T. Blood, 1822.

=== Theological methodology ===
The 20th-century Wesleyan scholar Albert Outler argued in his introduction to the 1985 article, "The Wesleyan Quadrilateral—in John Wesley" that Wesley developed his theology by using a method that Outler termed the Wesleyan Quadrilateral. In this method, Wesley believed that the living core of Christianity was contained in Scripture (the Bible), and that it was the sole foundational source of theological development. The centrality of Scripture was so important for Wesley that he called himself "a man of one book," although he was well-read for his day. However, he believed that doctrine had to be in keeping with Christian orthodox tradition. So, tradition was considered the second aspect of the Quadrilateral. Wesley contended that a part of the theological method would involve experiential faith. In other words, truth would be vivified in the personal experience of Christians (overall, not individually), if it were really truth. And every doctrine must be able to be defended rationally. He did not divorce faith from reason. Tradition, experience and reason, however, were subject always to Scripture, Wesley argued, because only there is the Word of God revealed "so far as it is necessary for our salvation."

The doctrines which Wesley emphasised in his sermons and writings are prevenient grace, present personal salvation by faith, the witness of the Spirit, and entire sanctification.

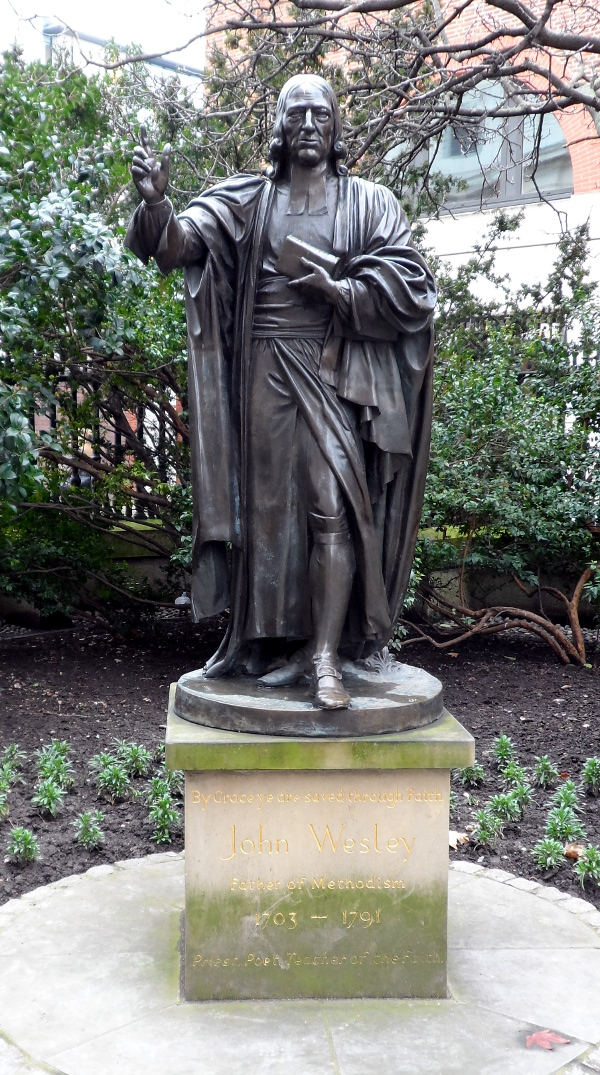
Bronze statue of Wesley in St Paul's Churchyard, London. A marble version stands inside Methodist Central Hall, Westminster.

=== Witness of the Spirit ===
Wesley defined the witness of the Spirit as "an inward impression on the soul of believers, whereby the Spirit of God directly testifies to their spirit that they are the children of God." He inherited this doctrine from the Protestant reformers Martin Luther and John Calvin. This doctrine was closely related to his belief that salvation had to be "personal." In his view, a person must ultimately believe the Good News for himself or herself; no one could be in relation to God for another.

=== Entire sanctification ===
Entire sanctification, he described in 1790, as the "grand depositum which God has lodged with the people called 'Methodists'" and that the propagation of this doctrine was the reason that He brought Methodists into existence. Wesley taught that entire sanctification was obtainable after justification by faith, between justification and death. Wesley defined it as:

"That habitual disposition of soul which, in the sacred writings, is termed holiness; and which directly implies, the being cleansed from sin, 'from all filthiness both of flesh and spirit;' and, by consequence, the being endued with those virtues which were in Christ Jesus; the being so 'renewed in the image of our mind,' as to be 'perfect as our Father in heaven is perfect."

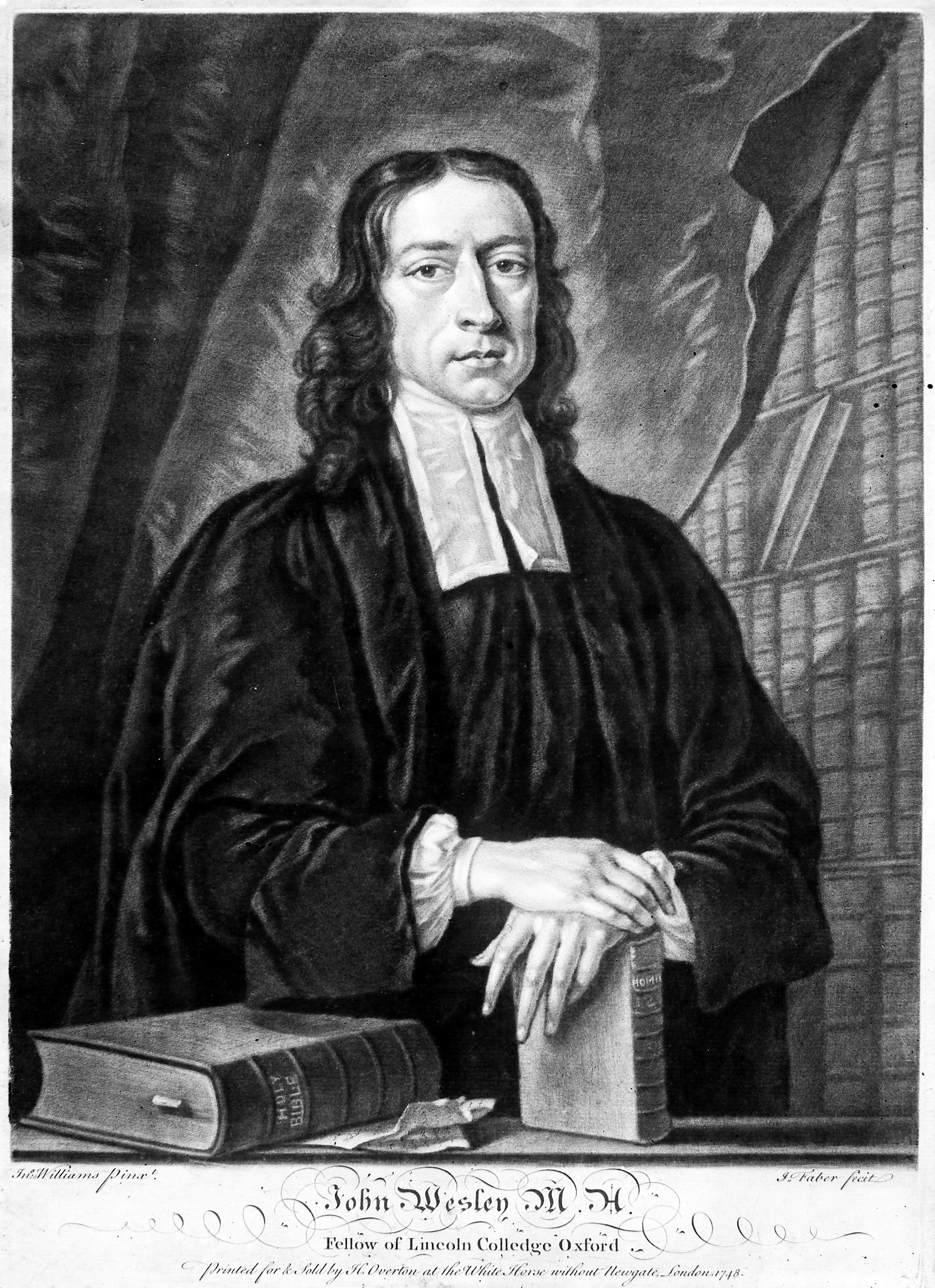
Wesley mezzotint by J. Faber, 1743

The term "sinless perfection" was one which Wesley avoided using "because of its ambiguity," rather, he contended that a Christian could be made "perfect in love". (Wesley studied Eastern Orthodoxy and embraced particularly the doctrine of Theosis). This love would mean, first of all, that a believer's motives, rather than being self-centred, would be guided by the deep desire to please God. One would be able to keep from committing what Wesley called, "sin rightly so-called." By this, he meant a conscious or intentional breach of God's will or laws.

Secondly, to be made perfect in love meant, for Wesley, that a Christian could live with a primary guiding regard for others and their welfare. He based this on Christ's quote that the second great command is "to love your neighbour as you love yourself." In Wesley's view, this orientation would cause a person to avoid any number of sins against his neighbour. This love, plus the love for God that could be the central focus of a person's faith, would be what Wesley referred to as "a fulfilment of the law of Christ." He described perfection as a second blessing and instantaneous sanctifying experience; he maintained that individuals could have the assurance of their entire sanctification through the testimony of the Holy Spirit. Wesley collected and published such testimonies.

=== Advocacy of Arminianism ===
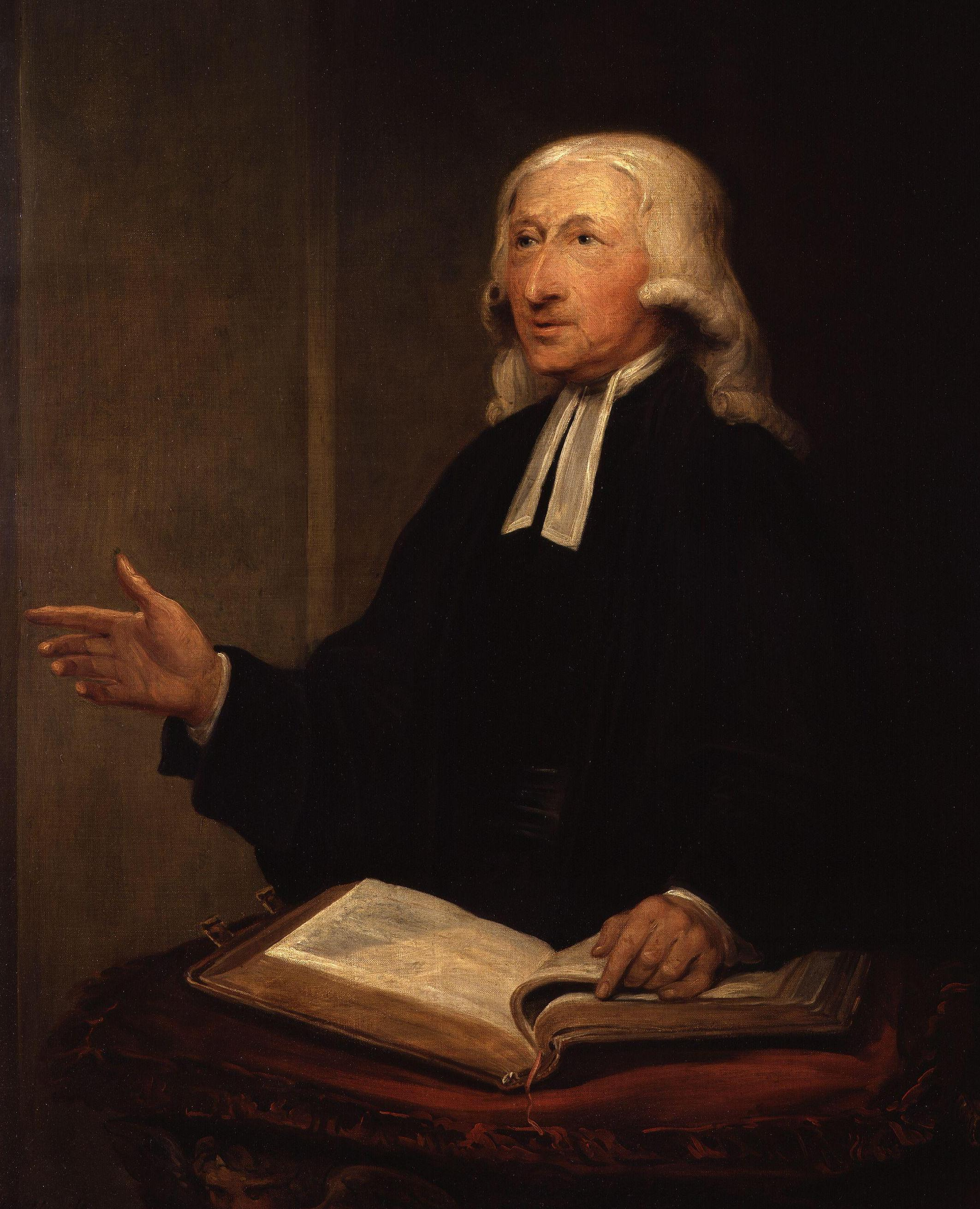
Portrait of Wesley by William Hamilton, 1788. Currently on display in John Wesley's House, City Road, London.

Wesley entered into controversies as he tried to enlarge church practice, with the most significant being his conflict with Calvinism. His father was of the Arminian school in the church. Wesley came to his own conclusions while in college and expressed himself strongly against the doctrines of unconditional election and reprobation. His system of thought has become known as Wesleyan Arminianism, the foundations of which were laid by Wesley and his fellow preacher John William Fletcher. Although Wesley knew very little about the beliefs of Jacob Arminius and arrived at his religious views independently of Arminius, Wesley acknowledged late in life, with the 1778 publication of The Arminian Magazine, that he and Arminius were in general agreement. He is now regarded as a faithful representative of Arminius' beliefs. Wesley was perhaps the clearest English proponent of Arminianism.

Prevenient grace was the theological underpinning of his belief that all persons were capable of being saved by faith in Christ. Wesley did not believe in the Calvinist understanding of predestination, that is, that some persons had been elected by God for salvation and others for damnation. He expressed his understanding of humanity's relationship to God as utter dependence upon God's grace. God was at work to spiritually enable all people to be capable of coming to faith.

By contrast, Whitefield inclined to Calvinism; in his first tour in America, he embraced the views of the New England school of Calvinism. Whitefield opposed Wesley's advocacy of Arminianism, though the two maintained a strained friendship. When in 1739 Wesley preached a sermon on Freedom of Grace, attacking the Calvinistic understanding of predestination as blasphemous, as it represented "God as worse than the devil," Whitefield asked him not to repeat or publish the discourse, as he did not want a dispute. Wesley published his sermon anyway. Whitefield was one of many who responded. The two men separated their practice in 1741. Wesley wrote that those who held to unlimited atonement did not desire separation, but "those who held 'particular redemption' would not hear of any accommodation."

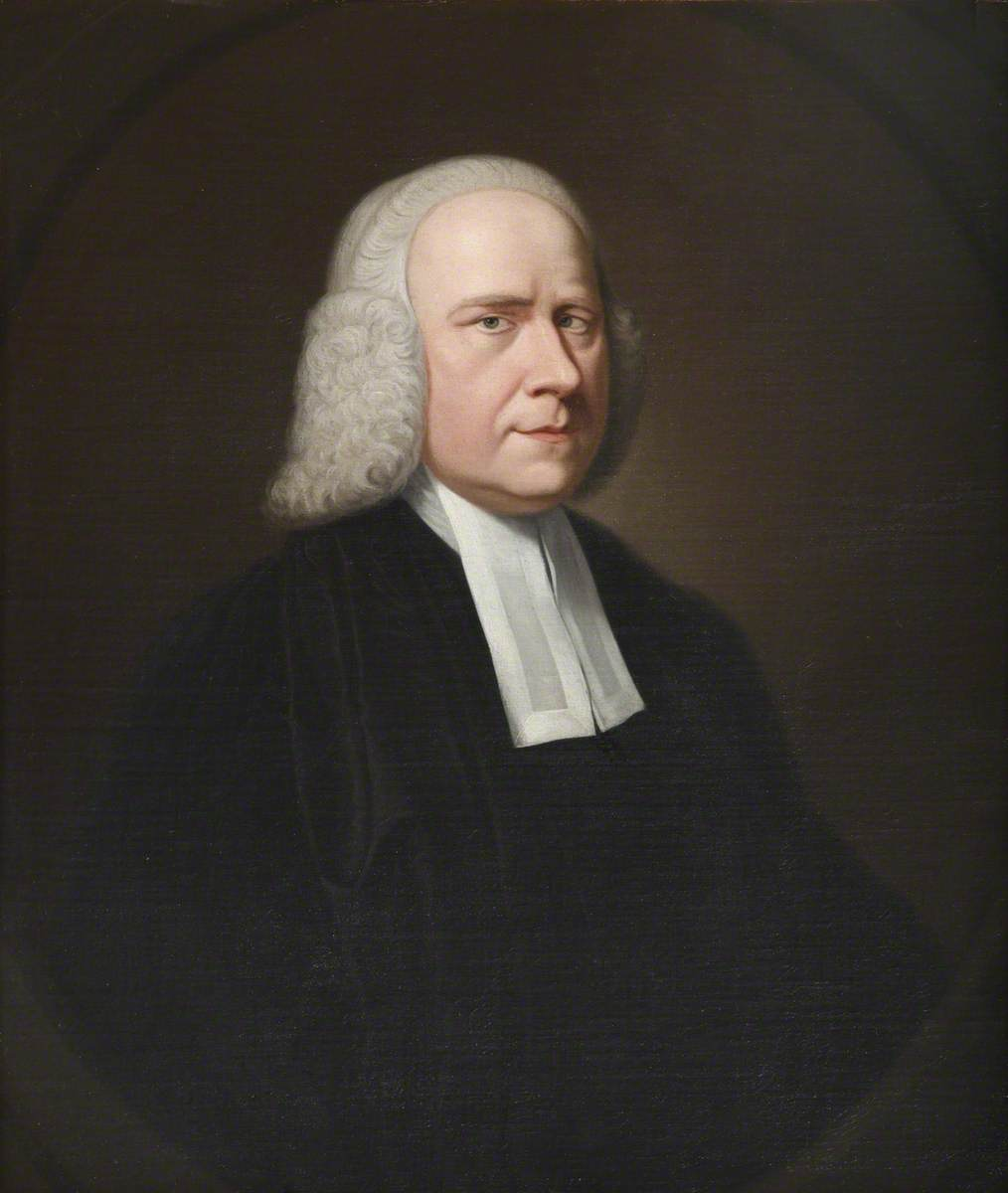
George Whitefield by Joseph Badger, c. 1745 (Harvard University Portrait Collection)

Whitefield, Howell Harris (leader of the Welsh Methodist revival), John Cennick, and others, became the founders of Calvinistic Methodism. Whitefield and Wesley, however, were soon back on friendly terms, and their friendship remained unbroken although they travelled different paths. When someone asked Whitefield if he thought he would see Wesley in heaven, Whitefield replied, "I fear not, for he will be so near the eternal throne and we at such a distance, we shall hardly get sight of him."

In 1770, the controversy broke out anew with violence and bitterness, as people's view of God related to their views of men and their possibilities. Augustus Toplady, Daniel Rowland, Sir Richard Hill and others were engaged on one side, while Wesley and Fletcher stood on the other. Toplady was editor of The Gospel Magazine, which had articles covering the controversy.

In 1778, Wesley began the publication of The Arminian Magazine, not, he said, to convince Calvinists, but to preserve Methodists. He wanted to teach the truth that "God willeth all men to be saved." A "lasting peace" could be secured in no other way.

Some have suggested that later in life, Wesley may have embraced the doctrine of universal salvation. This claim is supported by a letter Wesley wrote in 1787, in which he endorsed a work by Charles Bonnet that concluded in favour of universalism. However, this interpretation is disputed.

=== Support for abolitionism ===
Later in his ministry, Wesley was a keen abolitionist, speaking out and writing against the slave trade. Wesley denounced slavery as "the sum of all villainies" and detailed its abuses. He addressed the slave trade in a polemical tract, titled Thoughts Upon Slavery, in 1774. He wrote, "Liberty is the right of every human creature, as soon as he breathes the vital air; and no human law can deprive him of that right which he derives from the law of nature". Wesley influenced George Whitefield to journey to the colonies, spurring the transatlantic debate on slavery. Wesley was a mentor to William Wilberforce, who was also influential in the abolition of slavery in the British Empire.

It is thanks to Wesley's abolitionist message that a young African American, Richard Allen, converted to Christianity in 1777 and later founded, in 1816, the African Methodist Episcopal Church (AME), in the Methodist tradition.

=== Support for women preachers ===
Women had an active role in Wesley's Methodism and were encouraged to lead classes. In 1761, he informally allowed Sarah Crosby, one of his converts and a class leader, to preach. On an occasion where over 200 people attended a class she was meant to teach, Crosby felt as though she could not fulfil her duties as a class leader given the large crowd and decided to preach instead. She wrote to Wesley to seek his advice and forgiveness. He let Crosby continue her preaching so long as she refrained from as many of the mannerisms of preaching as she could. Between 1761 and 1771, Wesley wrote detailed instructions to Crosby and others, with specifics on what styles of preaching they could use. For instance, in 1769, Wesley allowed Crosby to give exhortations.

In the summer of 1771, Mary Bosanquet wrote to John Wesley to defend her and Sarah Crosby's work preaching and leading classes at her orphanage, Cross Hall. Bosanquet's letter is considered to be the first full and true defence of women's preaching in Methodism. Her argument was that women should be able to preach when they experienced an 'extraordinary call' or when given permission from God. Wesley accepted Bosanquet's argument and formally began to allow women to preach in Methodism in 1771. Methodist women, including preachers, continued to observe the ancient practice of Christian head covering.

=== Interfaith relations ===
Wesley assumed the superiority of Christianity vis-à-vis to Islam, based on his commitment to the biblical revelation as "the book of God". His theological interpretation of Christianity was seeking its imperative rather than considering other Abrahamic and Eastern religions to be equal. He regarded the righteous lifestyles of Muslims as an "ox goad" to prick the collective Christian conscience. Although his Letter to a Roman Catholic (1749), a conciliatory appeal for understanding and shared Christian faith, is sometimes seen as an act of religious tolerance, Wesley remained rooted in the anti-Catholicism characteristic of 18th-century England.

== Personal life and activities ==
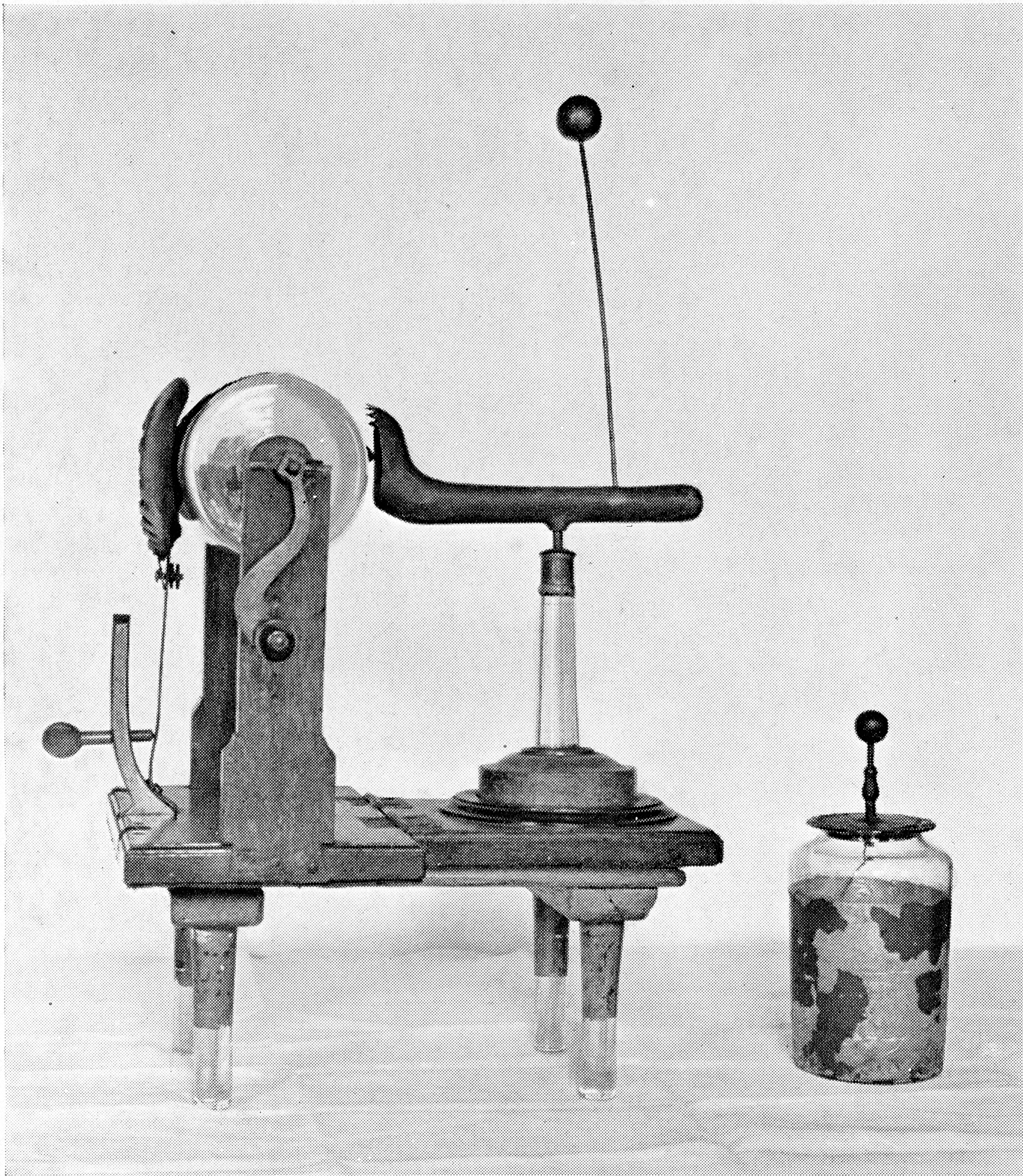
Sketch of an electrical machine designed by Wesley

Wesley travelled widely, generally on horseback, preaching two or three times each day. Stephen Tomkins writes that "[Wesley] rode 250,000 miles, gave away 30,000 pounds, ... and preached more than 40,000 sermons". He formed societies, opened chapels, examined and commissioned preachers, administered aid charities, prescribed for the sick, helped to pioneer the use of electric shock for the treatment of illness, and superintended orphanages and schools (including Kingswood School).

Wesley practised a vegetarian diet and in later life abstained from wine for health reasons. He wrote, "thanks be to God, since the time I gave up flesh meals and wine I have been delivered from all physical ills". Wesley warned against the dangers of alcohol abuse in his famous sermon, The Use of Money, and in his letter to an alcoholic. In his sermon, On Public Diversions, Wesley says: "You see the wine when it sparkles in the cup, and are going to drink of it. I tell you there is poison in it! and, therefore, beg you to throw it away". These statements against alcohol use largely concerned "hard liquors and spirits" rather than the low-alcohol beer, which was often safer to drink than the contaminated water of that time. Methodist churches became pioneers in the teetotal temperance movement of the 19th and 20th centuries, and later it became de rigueur in British Methodism.

He attended music concerts, and was especially an admirer of Charles Avison. After attending a performance in Bristol Cathedral in 1758, Wesley recorded in his journal: "I went to the cathedral to hear Mr. Handel's Messiah. I doubt if that congregation was ever so serious at a sermon as they were during this performance. In many places, especially several of the choruses, it exceeded my expectation."

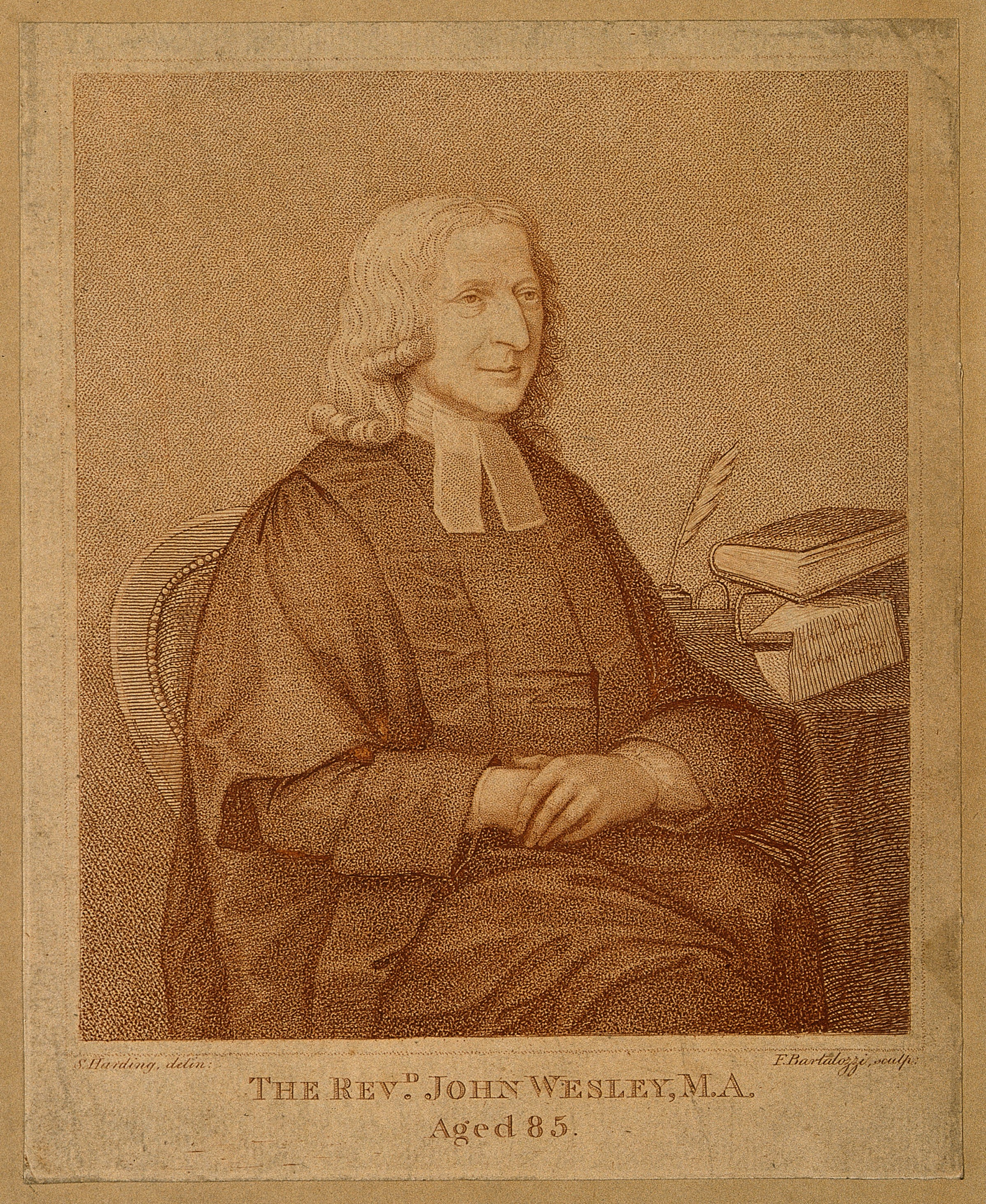
Stipple engraving by Francesco Bartolozzi, c. 1788

He is described as "rather under the medium height, well proportioned, strong, with a bright eye, a clear complexion, and a saintly, intellectual face". Though Wesley favoured celibacy rather than marital bond, he married very unhappily in 1751, at the age of 48, to a widow, Mary Vazeille, described as "a well-to-do widow and mother of four children." The couple had no children. John Singleton writes: "By 1758 she had left him—unable to cope, it is said, with the competition for his time and devotion presented by the ever-burgeoning Methodist movement. Molly, as she was known, was to return and leave him again on several occasions before their final separation." Of this ultimate departure Wesley simply reported in his journal, "Non eam reliqui, non demisi, non revocabo; I did not forsake her, I did not dismiss her, I will not recall her."

In 1770, at the death of George Whitefield, Wesley wrote a memorial sermon which praised Whitefield's admirable qualities and acknowledged the two men's differences: "There are many doctrines of a less essential nature ... In these we may think and let think; we may 'agree to disagree.' But, meantime, let us hold fast the essentials..." Wesley may have been the first to use "agree to disagree" in print—in the modern sense of tolerating differences—though he himself attributed the saying to Whitefield, and it had appeared in other senses previously.

Wesley was gravely ill during a visit to Lisburn in Ireland in June 1775. He stayed at the home of a leading Methodist, Henrietta Gayer, where he recovered.

== Death ==
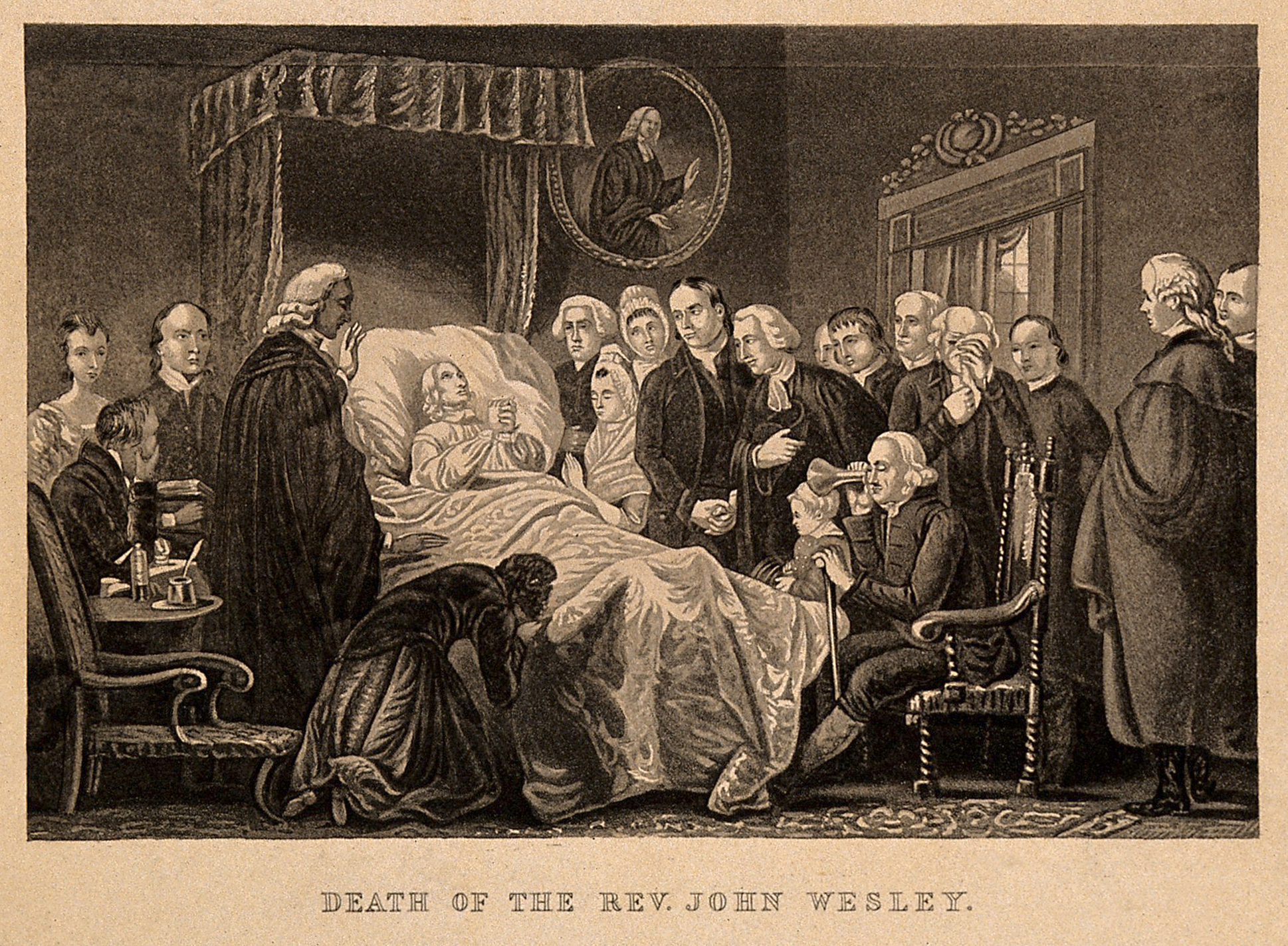
Wesley on his deathbed: "The best of all is, God is with us". Mezzotint by John Sartain.

Wesley's health declined sharply towards the end of his life and he ceased preaching. On 28 June 1790, less than a year before his death, he wrote:

This day I enter into my eighty-eighth year. For above eighty-six years, I found none of the infirmities of old age: my eyes did not wax dim, neither was my natural strength abated. But last August, I found almost a sudden change. My eyes were so dim that no glasses would help me. My strength likewise now quite forsook me and probably will not return in this world.

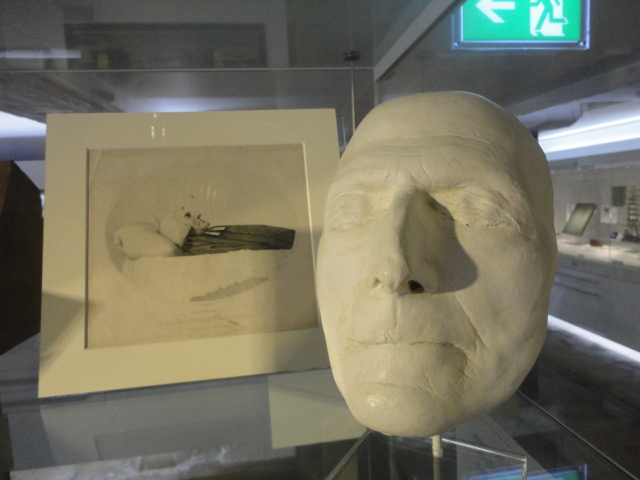
Wesley's death mask, exhibited in the Museum of Methodism, London

Wesley was cared for during his last months by Elizabeth Ritchie and his physician John Whitehead. He died on 2 March 1791, at the age of 87. As he lay dying, his friends gathered around him, Wesley grasped their hands and said repeatedly, "Farewell, farewell." At the end, he said, "The best of all is, God is with us", lifted his arms and raised his feeble voice again, repeating the words, "The best of all is, God is with us." He was entombed at his chapel on City Road, London. Ritchie wrote an account of his death which was quoted from by Whitehead at his funeral.

Because of his charitable nature, he died poor, leaving as the result of his life's work 135,000 members and 541 itinerant preachers under the name "Methodist". It has been said that "when John Wesley was carried to his grave, he left behind him a good library of books, a well-worn clergyman's gown" and the Methodist Church.

== Literary work ==
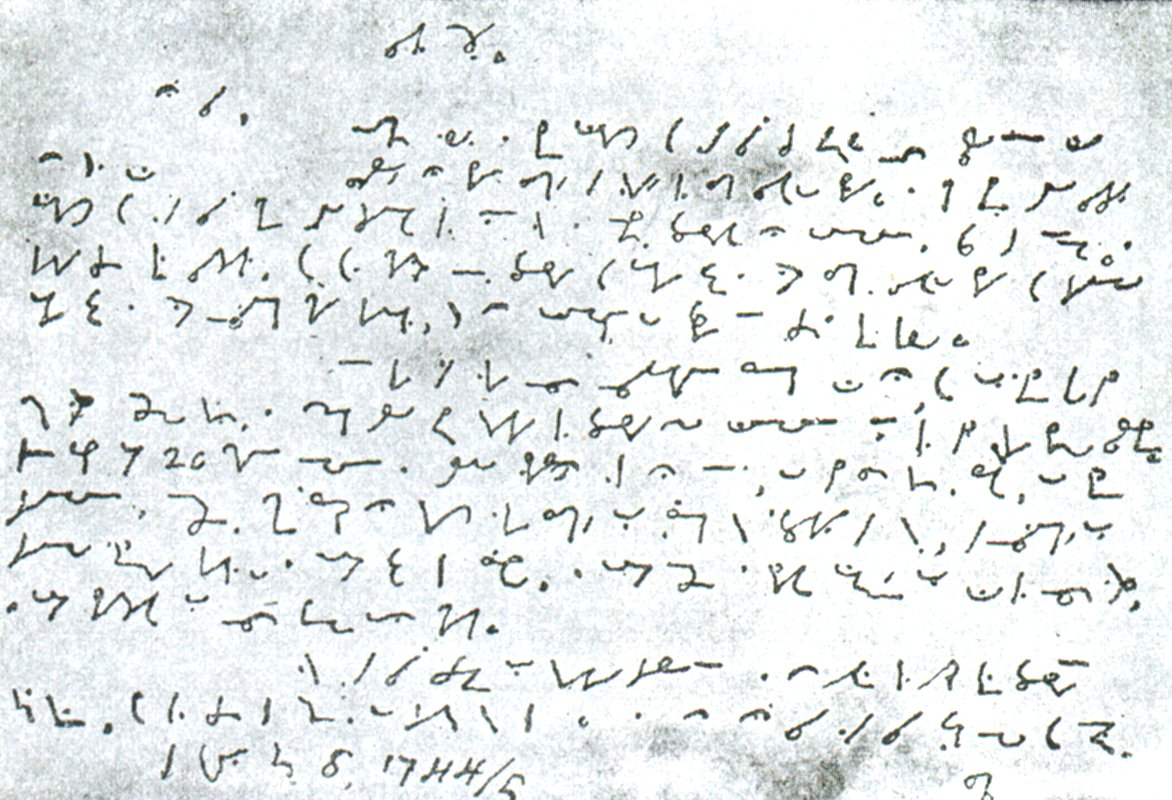
Wesley's shorthand writing

Wesley wrote, edited or abridged some 400 publications. As well as theology he wrote about music, marriage, medicine, abolitionism and politics. Wesley was a logical thinker and expressed himself clearly, concisely and forcefully in writing. Between 1746 and 1760, Wesley compiled several volumes of written sermons, published as Sermons on Several Occasions; the first four volumes comprise forty-four sermons which are doctrinal in content. His Forty-Four Sermons and the Explanatory Notes Upon the New Testament (1755) are Methodist doctrinal standards. Wesley was a fluent, powerful and effective preacher; he usually preached spontaneously and briefly, though occasionally at great length.

In his Christian Library (1750), he writes about mystics such as Macarius of Egypt, Ephrem the Syrian, Madame Guyon, François Fénelon, Ignatius of Loyola, John of Ávila, Francis de Sales, Blaise Pascal, and Antoinette Bourignon. The work reflects the influence of Christian mysticism in Wesley's ministry from the beginning to the end, although he ever rejected it after the failure in Georgia mission.

Wesley's prose, Works, were first collected by himself (32 vols., Bristol, 1771–74, frequently reprinted in editions varying greatly in the number of volumes). His chief prose works are a standard publication in seven octavo volumes of the Methodist Book Concern, New York. The Poetical Works of John and Charles, ed. G. Osborn, appeared in 13 vols., London, 1868–72.

In addition to his Sermons and Notes are his Journals (originally published in 20 parts, London, 1740–89; new ed. by N. Curnock containing notes from unpublished diaries, 6 vols., vols. i–ii, London and New York, 1909–11); The Doctrine of Original Sin (Bristol, 1757; in reply to John Taylor of Norwich); An Earnest Appeal to Men of Reason and Religion (originally published in three parts; 2nd ed., Bristol, 1743), an elaborate defence of Methodism, describing the evils of the times in society and the church; and a Plain Account of Christian Perfection (1766).

Wesley's Sunday Service was an adaptation of the Book of Common Prayer for use by American Methodists. In his Watchnight service, he made use of a pietist prayer now generally known as the Wesley Covenant Prayer, perhaps his most famous contribution to Christian liturgy. He was a noted hymn-writer, translator and compiler of a hymnal.

Wesley also wrote on physics and medicine, such as in The Desideratum, subtitled Electricity made Plain and Useful by a Lover of Mankind and of Common Sense (1759). and Primitive Physick, Or, An Easy and Natural Method of Curing Most Diseases.

In spite of the proliferation of his literary output, Wesley was challenged for plagiarism, for borrowing heavily from an essay by Samuel Johnson, published in March 1775. Initially denying the charge, Wesley later apologised officially.

== Commemoration and legacy ==
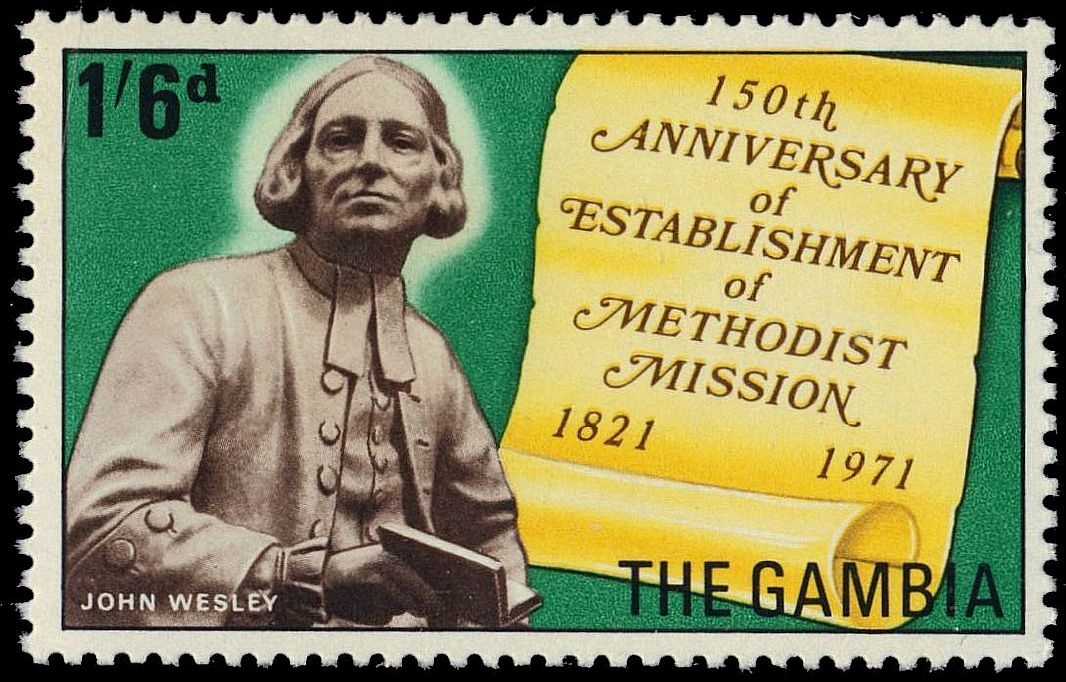
Postage stamp depicting John Wesley, issued on 16 April 1971 to commemorate the 150th anniversary of the Methodist mission in The Gambia

During the course of his missionary efforts, Wesley is said to have preached some forty thousand sermons and traveled 250,000 miles in the process. The last entry in his account-book is dated 16 July 1790. His last sermon was given on 23 February 1791 in Leatherhead, just south of Central London

In his early ministry years, Wesley was barred from preaching in many parish churches and the Methodists were persecuted; he later became widely respected, and by the end of his life, was described as "the best-loved man in England". Wesley continues to be the primary theological influence on Methodists and Methodist-heritage groups the world over; the Methodist movement numbers 75 million adherents in more than 130 countries. Wesleyan teachings also serve as a basis for the Holiness movement, which includes denominations like The Wesleyan Church, Free Methodist Church, the Church of the Nazarene, the Salvation Army, and several smaller groups, and from which Pentecostalism and parts of the Charismatic movement are offshoots. Wesley's call to personal and social holiness continues to challenge Christians who attempt to discern what it means to participate in the Kingdom of God.

He is commemorated in the Calendar of Saints of the Evangelical Lutheran Church in America on 2 March with his brother Charles. The Wesley brothers are honoured with a Lesser Feast on 3 March in the Calendar of Saints of the Episcopal Church, and on 24 May (Aldersgate Day, with a Lesser Festival) in the Church of England's Calendar. In 2002, Wesley was listed at number 50 on the BBC's list of the 100 Greatest Britons, drawn from a poll of the British public.

Wesley's house and chapel, which he built in 1778 on City Road in London, are still intact today and the chapel has a thriving congregation with regular services as well as the Museum of Methodism in the crypt. A replica of the rectory in which Wesley lived as a boy was constructed in the 1990s at Lake Junaluska, North Carolina. It formed part of a complex developed beginning in the 1950s for the World Methodist Council, which included a museum housing letters written by Wesley and a pulpit he had used. The museum experienced financial difficulties, and the COVID-19 pandemic finally made closing the museum necessary. Its collections were transferred to Bridwell Library of Perkins School of Theology, Southern Methodist University in Dallas, Texas.

Numerous schools, colleges, hospitals and other institutions are named after Wesley; additionally, many are named after Methodism. In 1831, Wesleyan University in Middletown, Connecticut, was the first institution of higher education in the United States to be named after Wesley. The now secular institution was founded as an all-male Methodist college.

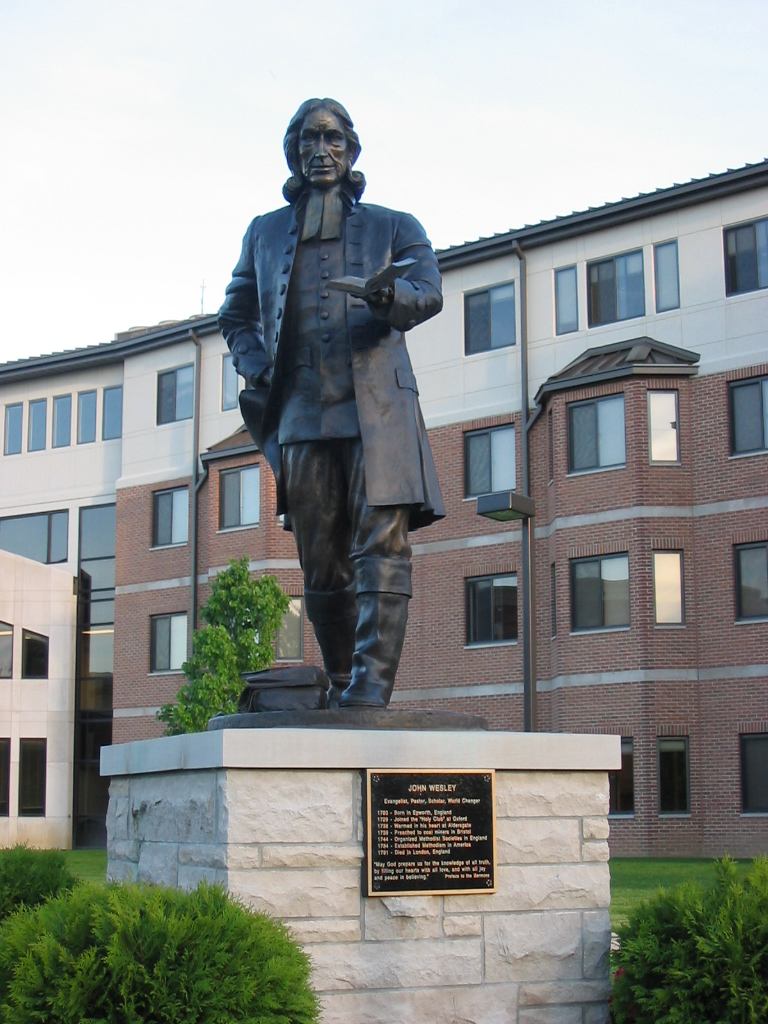
Wesley Statue at Indiana Wesleyan University (2003)

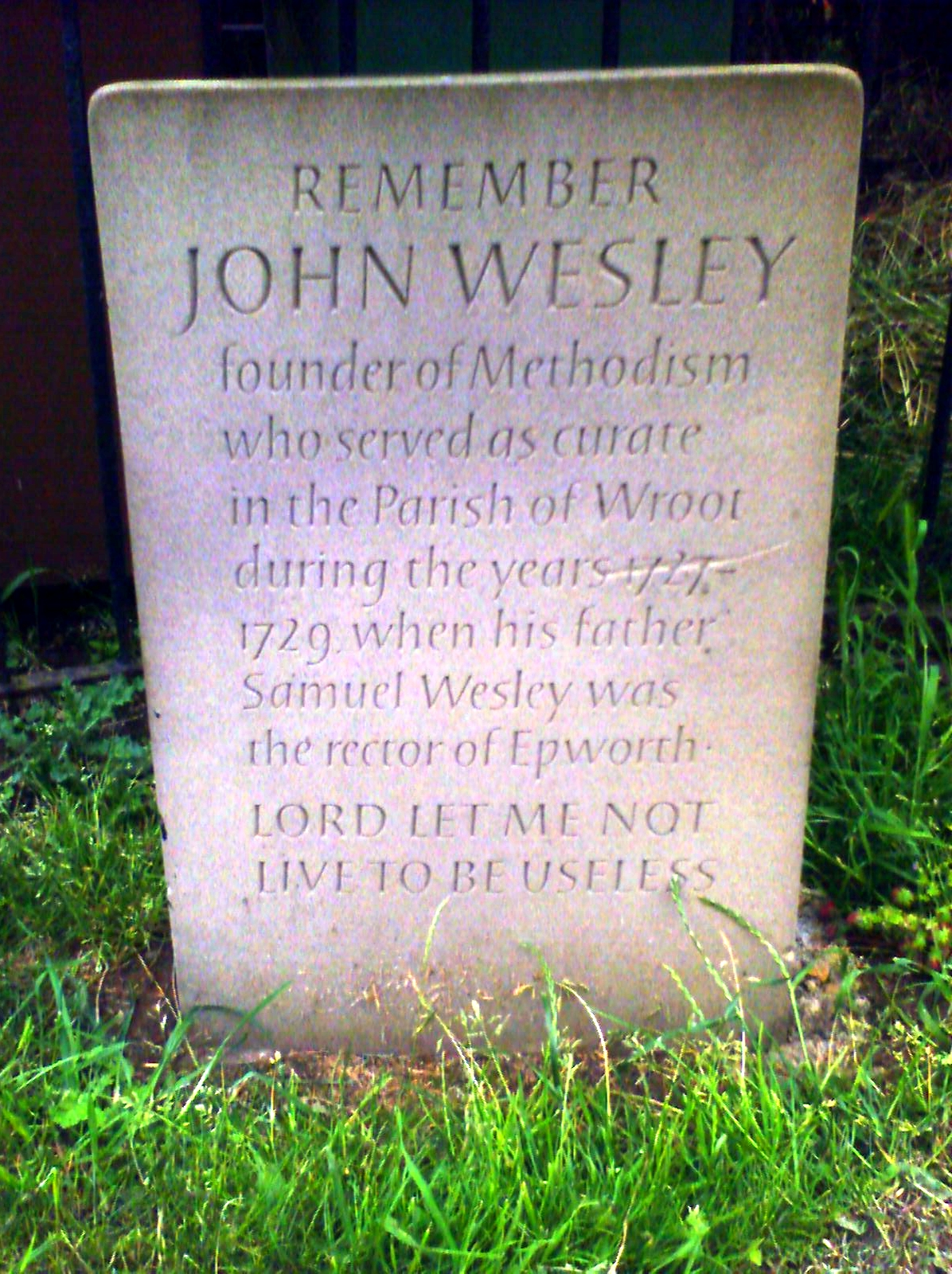
"Remember John Wesley", Wroot, near Epworth

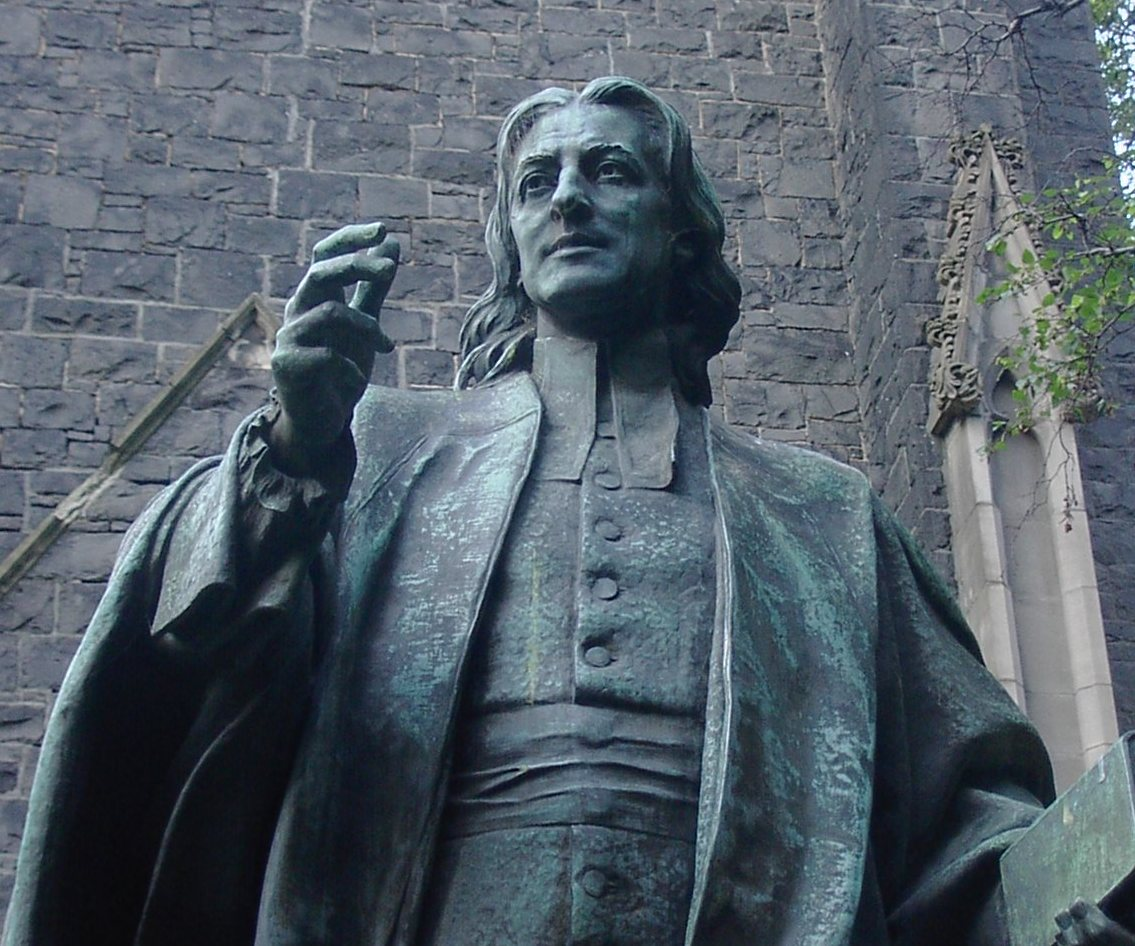
Statue of Wesley outside Wesley Church in Melbourne, Australia

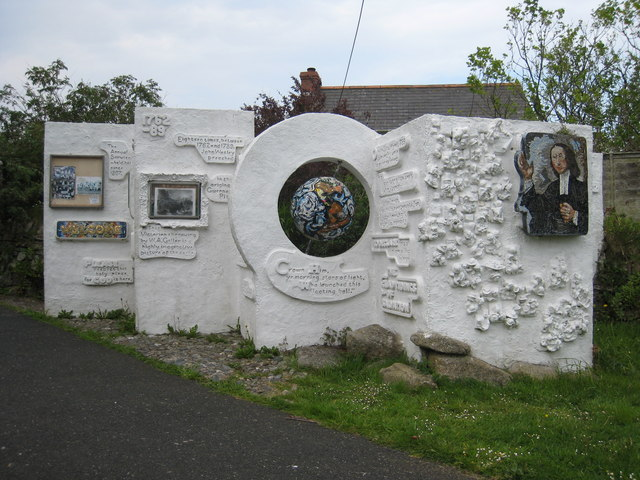
Display panel at Gwennap Pit in Cornwall, where Wesley preached

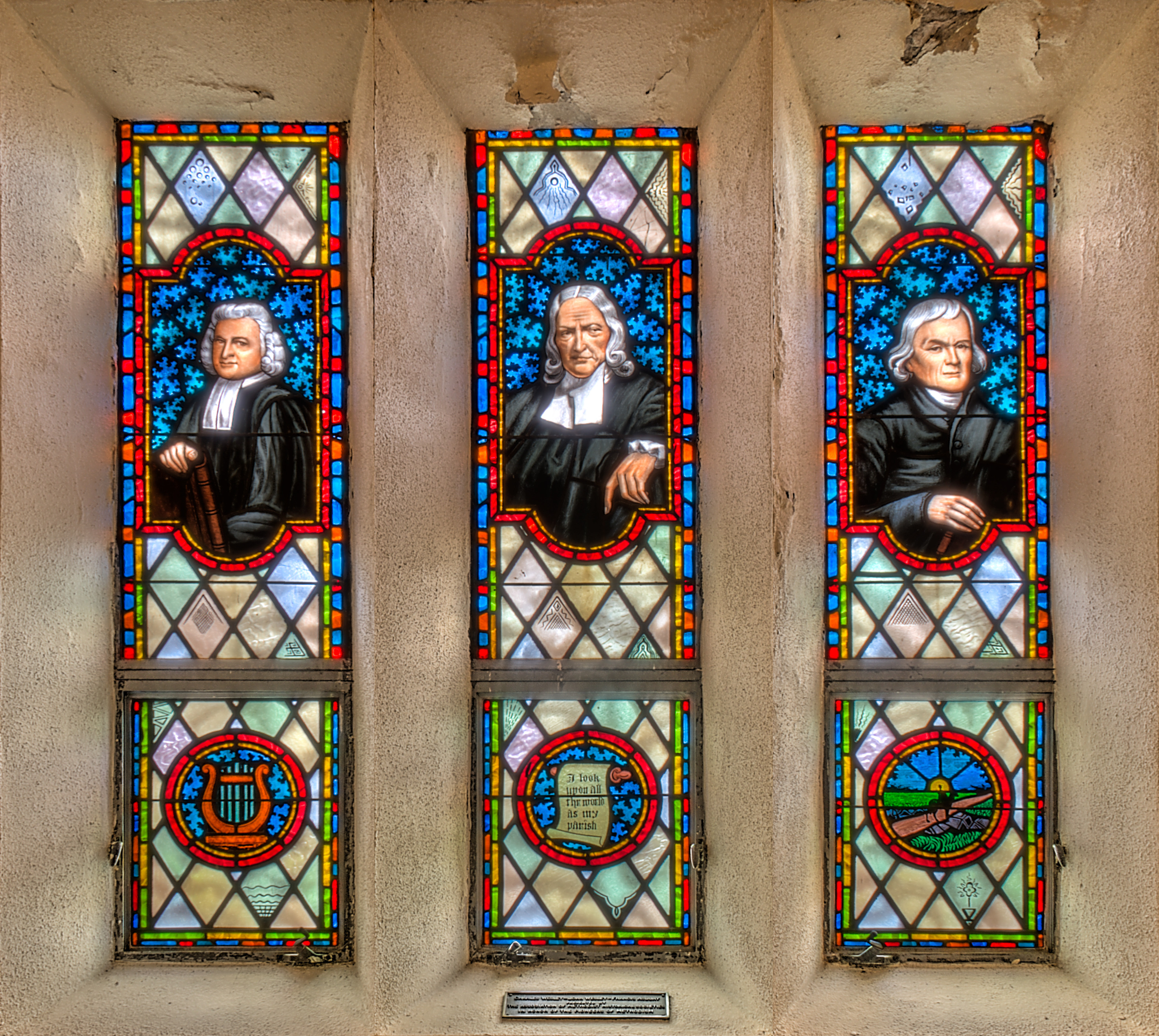
Stained glass window honouring the Wesleys and Asbury, at Lake Junaluska, North Carolina

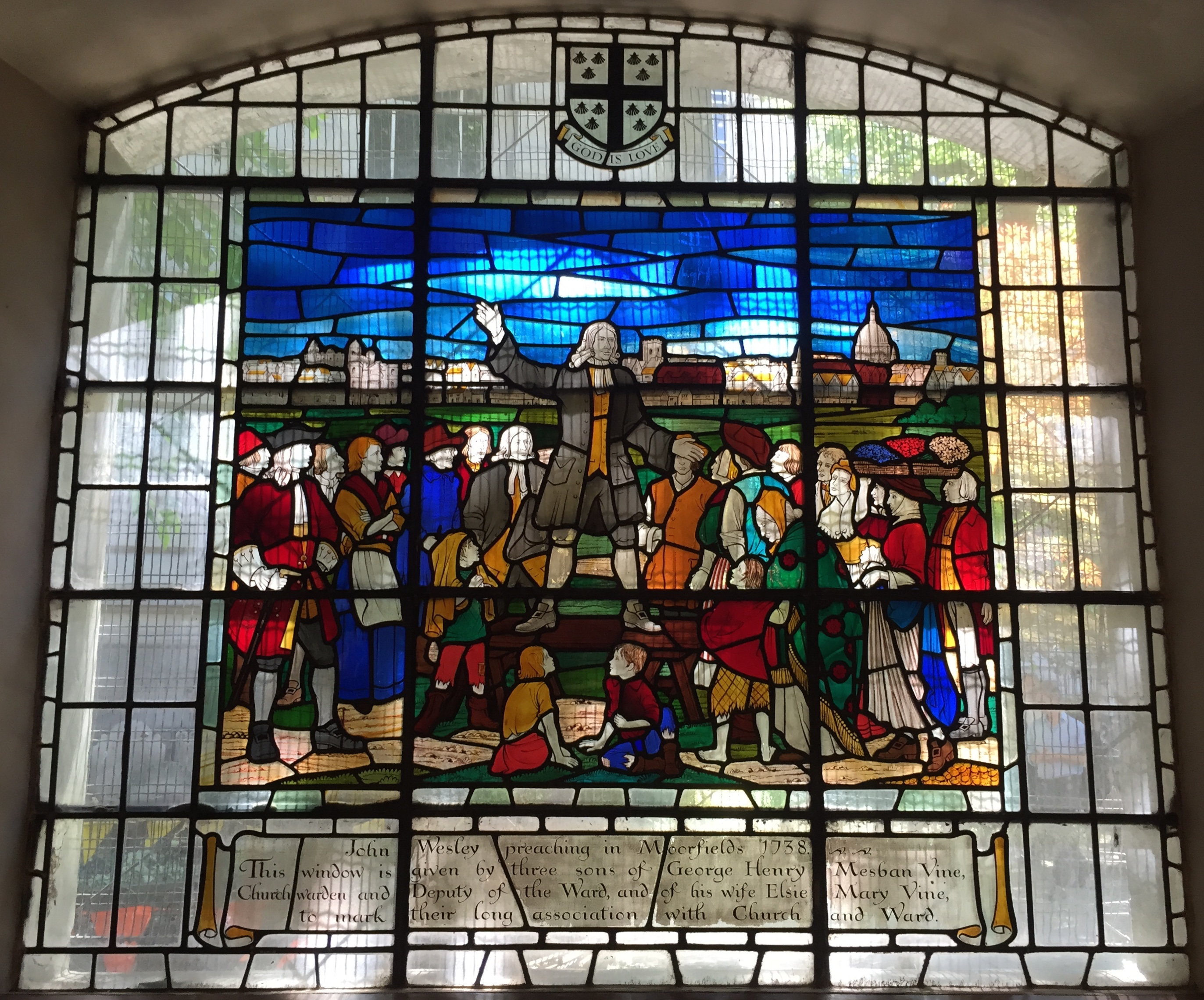
John Wesley preaching in Moorfields in 1738, stained glass in St Botolph's, Aldersgate

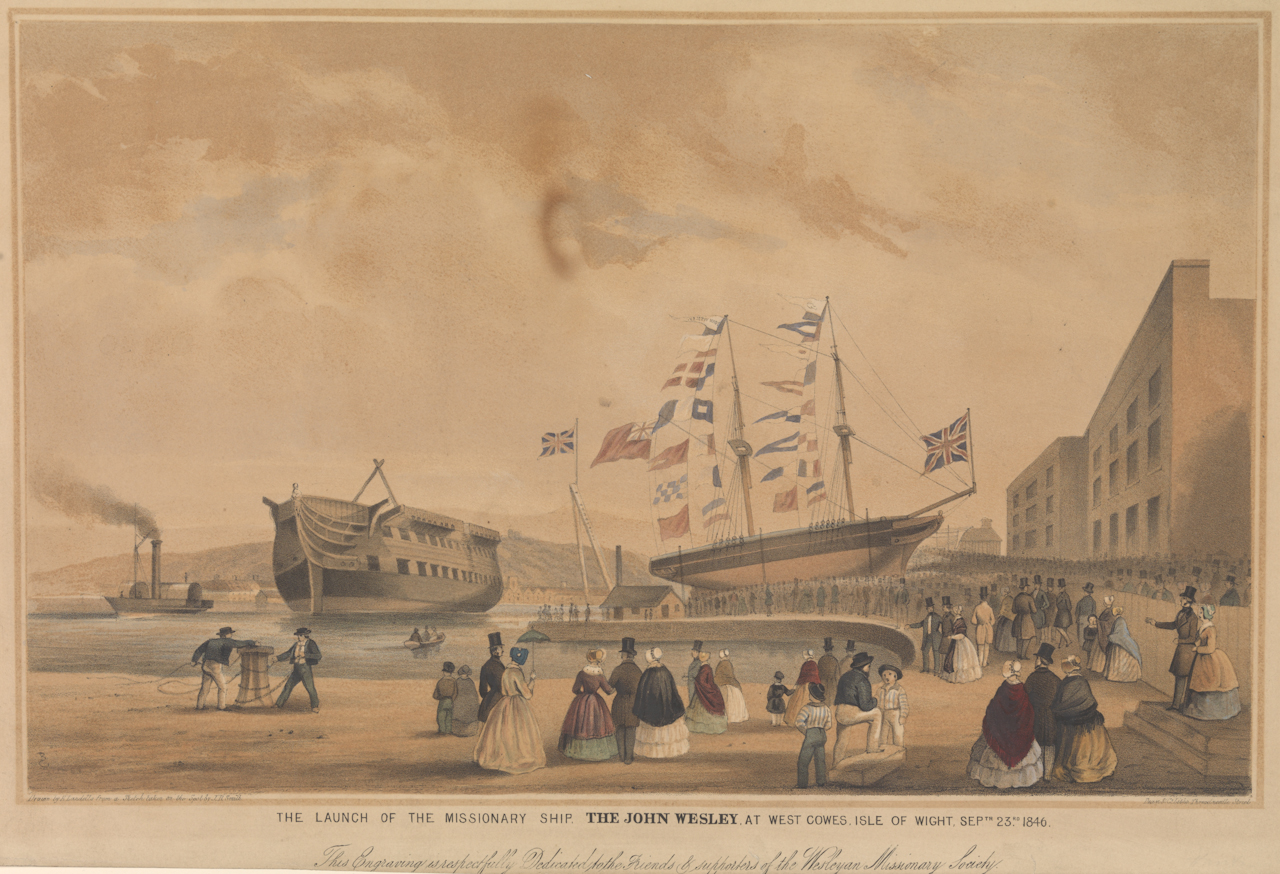
The launch of the Missionary ship the John Wesley at West Cowes, Isle of Wight, 23 September 1846

=== Film ===
In 1954, the Radio and Film Commission of the British Methodist Church, in co-operation with J. Arthur Rank, produced the film John Wesley. This was a live-action re-telling of the story of the life of Wesley, with Leonard Sachs in the title role.

In 2009, a more ambitious feature film, Wesley, was released by Foundery Pictures, starring Burgess Jenkins as Wesley.

=== Musical theatre ===
In 1976 the musical Ride! Ride!, composed by Penelope Thwaites and written by Alan Thornhill, premiered at the Westminster Theatre in London's West End. The piece is based on the true story of eighteen-year-old Martha Thompson's incarceration in Bedlam, an incident in Wesley's life. The premier ran for 76 performances. Since then it has had more than 40 productions, both amateur and professional, including a 1999 concert version, issued on the Somm record label, with Keith Michell as Wesley.

== Works ==
Wesley, John (1832). The works of the Reverend John Wesley. Vol. I. New York: B. Waugh and T. Mason.

- —— (1832). The works of the Reverend John Wesley. Vol. II. New York: B. Waugh and T. Mason.
- —— (1832). The works of the Reverend John Wesley. Vol. III. New York: B. Waugh and T. Mason.
- —— (1832). The works of the Reverend John Wesley. Vol. IV. New York: B. Waugh and T. Mason.
- —— (1832). The works of the Reverend John Wesley. Vol. V. New York: B. Waugh and T. Mason.
- —— (1832). The works of the Reverend John Wesley. Vol. VI. New York: B. Waugh and T. Mason.
- —— (1832). The works of the Reverend John Wesley. Vol. VII. New York: B. Waugh and T. Mason.

== See also ==
- John Wesley bibliography
  - Sermons of John Wesley
- William Seward – First Methodist martyr, killed while preaching
- List of Methodist theologians
- History of Christianity in Britain
- Wesley College, for educational institutions named after Wesley
- Divergence between Anglicanism and Methodism

== Notes and references ==
=== Sources ===
- Abelove, Henry (1997). "John Wesley's Plagiarism of Samuel Johnson and Its Contemporary Reception". The Huntington Library Quarterly. 59 (1): 73–80. doi:10.2307/3817906. JSTOR 3817906.
- Allin, Thomas (1888). Universalism Asserted. London: E. Stock.
- Anderson, Lesley G. (2001). "John Wesley and His Challenge to Alcoholism" (PDF). Wesley Heritage Foundation. Archived from the original (PDF) on 27 March 2009.
- Ayling, Stanley (1979). John Wesley. London: Collins. ISBN 978-0-002-16656-0.
- Bates, E. Ralph (1983). "Wesley's Property Deed for Bath" (PDF). Proceedings of the Wesley Historical Society. 44 (2). Wesley Historical Society: 25–35.
- BBC (12 July 2011). "Methodist Church". BBC.
- BBC Humberside (25 January 2008). "John Wesley at Epworth". BBC. BBC Humberside.
- BBC News (22 August 2002). "BBC reveals 100 great British heroes". BBC News.
- Beckett, Verona E.; Hill, Jane; Johnson, Pauline C. (1941). "Richard Allen". Negro History Bulletin. 5 (3). Association for the Study of African American Life and History: 62. JSTOR 44246641.
- Bonnet, Charles (1792). Conjectures Considering the Nature of Future Happiness. London: G. Paramore.
- Bowen, William Abraham (1901). Why Two Episcopal Methodist Churches in the United States?: A Brief History Answering this Question for the Benefit of Epworth Leaguers and Other Young Methodists. Nashville, TN: Publishing House of the M.E. Church.
- Brownlow, George Washington (1859). "John Wesley Preaching from His Father's Tomb at Epworth". Art UK.
- Buchanan, Colin (2006). Historical Dictionary of Anglicanism. Oxford: Scarecrow Press. ISBN 978-0-8108-6506-8.
- Buckley, James Monroe (1898). A History of Methodism in the United States. New York: Harper & Brothers. pp. 88–89.
- Bunting, William Braylesford (1940). Chapel-en-le-Frith – Its History and its People (1st ed.). Manchester: Sherratt & Hughes.
- Burdon, Adrian (2005). Authority and order: John Wesley and his preachers. Aldershot: Ashgate. ISBN 978-0-7546-5454-4.
- Burge, Janet (1996). Women Preachers in Community: Sarah Ryan, Sarah Crosby, Mary Bosanquet. [Peterborough]: Foundery Press. ISBN 978-1-85852-062-9.
- Burnett, Daniel L. (2006). In the Shadow of Aldersgate: An Introduction to the Heritage and Faith of the Wesleyan Tradition. La Vergne: Wipf and Stock.
- Burton, Vicki Tolar (2008). Spiritual Literacy in John Wesley's Methodism: Reading, Writing, and Speaking to Believe. Waco, TX: Baylor University Press. ISBN 978-1-60258-023-7.
- Busenitz, Nathan (2013). "John Wesley's Failed Marriage". the Cripplegate.
- Campbell, Ted A. (2019). Deeper Christian Faith, Revised Edition: A Re-Sounding. Wipf and Stock. ISBN 978-1-5326-5752-8.
- Carey, Brycchan (2005). British Abolitionism and the Rhetoric of Sensibility: Writing, Sentiment, and Slavery, 1760?1807. Basingstoke, England: Palgrave Macmillan.
- Carey, Brycchan (2003). "John Wesley's Thoughts Upon Slavery and the Language of the Heart" (PDF). Bulletin of the John Rylands University Library of Manchester. 85 (2–3): 269–284. doi:10.7227/BJRL.85.2-3.17.
- Carroll, H. K. (1953). "Wesley, John". The New Schaff-Herzog Encyclopedia of Religious Knowledge. Vol. 12. Grand Rapids: Baker.
- Cheetham, J. Keith (2003). On the Trail of John Wesley. Edinburgh: Luath Press. ISBN 978-1-8428-2023-0.
- Chilcote, Paul Wesley (1993). She Offered Them Christ: The Legacy of Women Preachers in Early Methodism. Eugene, OR: Wipf and Stock. ISBN 1-57910-668-4.
- Chilcote, Paul Wesley (1991). John Wesley and the Women Preachers of Early Methodism. Metuchen, N.J.: Scarecrow Press. pp. 121–122. ISBN 0-8108-2414-0.
- Coe, Bufford W. (1996). John Wesley and Marriage. Bethlehem: Lehigh University Press. ISBN 0-934223-39-4.
- Collins, Kenneth J (2003). John Wesley A Theological Journey. Nashville Tennessee: Abingdon Press.
- Cooke, R. J. (1896). The historic episcopate: a study of Anglican claims and Methodist orders. New York: Eaton & Mains.
- Cox, Leo G. (1969). "Prevenient Grace - A Wesleyan View" (PDF). Journal of the Evangelical Theological Society: 143–149.
- Cracknell, Kenneth; White, Susan J. (2005). An Introduction to World Methodism. Cambridge: Cambridge University Press. ISBN 978-0-521-81849-0.
- Craik, Henry (1916). "John Wesley (1703–1791). A Man of One Book". English prose selections. Vol. 9. London: Macmillan.
- Crain, Mary B. (2009). Haunted Christmas: Yuletide Ghosts and Other Spooky Holiday Happenings. Guilford, CT.: Globe Pequot. ISBN 978-0-7627-5275-1.
- Crookshank, Charles Henry (1882). Memorable women of Irish Methodism in Ireland in the last century. London: Wesleyan-Methodist book-room.
- Curtis, Jonathan Paul (February 2016). Methodism and Abstinence: a History of The Methodist Church and Teetotalism (PDF) (Thesis). University of Exeter. pp. 166–177.
- Daniels, William Haven (1884). The illustrated history of Methodism in Great Britain, America, and Australia : from the days of the Wesleys to the present time. Vol. III. London Rivingtons.
- Dayton, Donald W. (1987). Theological Roots of Pentecostalism. Peabody, MA: Hendrickson Pub. ISBN 0-8010-4604-1.
- Dose, Kai (2015). "A Note on John Wesley's Visit to Herrnhut in 1738". Wesley and Methodist Studies. 7 (1): 117–120. doi:10.5325/weslmethstud.7.1.0117. JSTOR 10.5325/weslmethstud.7.1.0117.
- Dreyer, Frederick A. (1999). The Genesis of Methodism. Bethlehem, N.J.: Lehigh University Press.
- Dunlap, David (1 November 1994). "Headcovering-A Historical Perspective". Uplook Ministries.
- Eason, Andrew Mark (2003). Women in God's Army: Gender and Equality in the Early Salvation Army. Waterloo, Ont.: Wilfrid Laurier University Press. ISBN 978-0-88920-821-6.
- Edge, John T. (2000). Georgia. Oakland, CA: Compass American Guides.
- English, John C. (1994). "'Dear Sister': John Wesley and the Women of Early Methodism". Methodist History. 33 (1): 32.
- Evans, Richard W. (June 1961). "The Relations of George Whitefield and Howell Harris, Fathers of Calvinistic Methodism". Church History. 30 (2): 179–190. doi:10.2307/3161971. JSTOR 3161971. S2CID 162732958.
- Fay, Roger (2017). "John Wesley and Music". Evangelical Times. Section § Oratorios.
- Field, David N. (May 2015). "John Wesley As A Public Theologian: The Case Of Thoughts Upon Slavery". Scriptura. 114. University of South Africa. doi:10.7833/114-0-1136.
- Goodwin, Charles H. (1996). "John Wesley: Revival and Revivalism, 1736–1768" (PDF). Wesleyan Theological Journal. 31 (1): 171–189.
- Gordon, Alexander (Reverend) (1899). Lee, Sidney (ed.). Dictionary of National Biography. Vol. LX: Watson - Whewell. London, Smith, Elder & Co.
- Graham, E. Dorothy (2004). "Ritchie [married name Mortimer], Elizabeth". Oxford Dictionary of National Biography (online ed.). Oxford University Press. doi:10.1093/ref:odnb/63471. (Subscription, Wikipedia Library access or UK public library membership required.)
- Graves, Dan (2007). "1st Methodist Conference Convened in London". Christianity.com.
- Green, Roger J. (2019). "1738 John & Charles Wesley Experience Conversions". Christianity Today.
- Gunter, W. Stephen (2011). An Annotated Content Index. The Arminian Magazine, Vols. 1–20 (1778–1797) (PDF). Duke Divinity School.
- Gunter, William Stephen (2007). "John Wesley, a Faithful Representative of Jacobus Arminius" (PDF). Wesleyan Theological Journal. 42 (2): 65–82.
- Hammond, Geordan (2014). John Wesley in America: Restoring Primitive Christianity. Oxford: Oxford University Press.
- Hattersley, Roy (2002). A Brand from the Burning: The Life of John Wesley. London: Little, Brown. ISBN 978-0-316-86020-8.
- Heath, Elaine A. (2010). Naked Faith: The Mystical Theology of Phoebe Palmer. Cambridge: James Clarke & Co. ISBN 978-0-227-90331-5.
- Heitzenrater, Richard P. (1972). John Wesley and the Oxford Methodists, 1725-1735 (Doctor of Philosophy thesis). [Durham, North Carolina]: Duke University. OCLC 21054141. H473J.
- Hindle, Gordon Bradley (1975). Provision for the Relief of the Poor in Manchester, 1754–1826. Manchester: Manchester University Press for the Chetham Society.
- Hodges, Sam (2014). "Re-evaluating John Wesley's time in Georgia". United Methodist Church News.
- Holden, H. W. (1870). John Wesley in John Wesley in Company with High Churchmen. London: Church Press Co.
- Hubbard, Robert; Hubbard, Kathleen (2018). Hidden History of Middlesex County, Connecticut. Charleston, SC: Arcadia Publishing.
- Hurst, J. F. (1903). John Wesley the Methodist: A Plain Account of His Life and Work. New York: Methodist Book Concern.
- Hyatt, Vicki (16 June 2021). "Benefactors discuss significance of World Methodist Council building". The Mountaineer.
- Iovino, Joe (2016). "The method of early Methodism: The Oxford Holy Club". United Methodist Church.
- Jensen, Carolyn Passig (2013). The Spiritual Rhetoric of Early Methodist Women: Susanna Wesley, Sarah Crosby, Mary Bosanquet Fletcher, and Hester Rogers (Doctor of Philosophy thesis). [Norman, Oklahoma]: University of Oklahoma.
- Johnson, Paul (2002). "Was there madness in his Methodism?". Telegraph.
- Johnstone, Lucy (2000). Users and Abusers of Psychiatry: A Critical Look at Psychiatric Practice. London: Routledge. p. 152. ISBN 0-415-21155-7.
- Jones, Charles Edwin, ed. (2002) [1867]. True Method of Promoting Perfect Love: From Debates in the New-York Preachers' Meeting of the Methodist-Episcopal Church, on the Question, What are the Best Methods of Promoting the Experience of Perfect Love?. Foster & Palmer.
- Kiefer, James (2019). "John & Charles Wesley: Renewers of the Church (3 March 1791)". The Lectionary.
- Knight, Henry H. (28 February 2018). John Wesley: Optimist of Grace. Eugene, Oregon: Wipf and Stock. ISBN 978-1-5326-4639-3.
- Knight, John A. (1978). "John Fletcher's Influence on the Development of Wesleyan Theology in America" (PDF). Wesleyan Theological Journal. 13: 13–33.
- LAMC (2019). "A brief history and the structure of Methodism". Launceston Area Methodist Churches. Archived from the original on 14 December 2019.
- Lane, Mark H. (2015). "John Wesley Receives the Holy Spirit at Aldersgate" (PDF). Bible Numbers for Life.
- Law, William (2009). A Serious Call to a Devout and Holy Life. Peabody, MA: Hendrickson Publishers.
- Lawrence, Anna M. (2011). One Family Under God: Love, Belonging, and Authority in Early Transatlantic Methodism. Philadelphia: University of Pennsylvania Press. ISBN 978-0-8122-0417-9.
- Lee, Jesse (1810). A Short History of the Methodists in the United States of America. Baltimore: Magill and Clime.
- Lloyd, Jennifer M. (2009). Women and the Shaping of British Methodism: Persistent Preachers, 1807–1907. Oxford: Manchester University Press. ISBN 978-1-84779-323-2.
- Loyer, Kenneth (2014). God's Love Through the Spirit. The Catholic University of America Press. ISBN 978-0-8132-2599-9.
- Maddox, Randy L.; Vickers, Jason E. (2010). The Cambridge Companion to John Wesley. Cambridge: Cambridge University Press.
- Manchester City Council (2019). "Stevenson Square Conservation Area: History". Manchester City Council.
- Martin, Gary (2019). "Agree to disagree". The Phrase Finder.
- McCormick, K. Steve (1991). "Theosis in Chrysostom and Wesley: An Eastern Paradigm of Faith and Love" (PDF). Wesleyan Theological Journal. 26. Wesley Center for Applied Theology: 38–103.
- McDonald, Calvin (2012). From the Coffin to the Cross: A Much Needed Awakening. Bloomington Drive: WestBow Press. ISBN 978-1-4497-7791-3.
- Mellor, G. Howard (2003). "The Wesleyan Quadrilateral". Methodist Evangelicals Together.
- Miller, Andrew (2012). "John Wesley's "Grand Depositum" and Nine Essentials from Primitive Methodism". Seedbed.
- Morgan, Kenneth (1990). "John Wesley and Bristol". Bristol Historical Association Pamphlets (75).
- NYPL Digital Collections. "John Wesley preaching to the Indians". The Miriam and Ira D. Wallach Division of Art, Prints and Photographs: Print Collection, The New York Public Library.
- Oakes, Edward T. (2004). "John Wesley: A Biography". First Things.
- O'Brien, Glen (June 2021). ""I Wish Them Well, but I Dare Not Trust Them": John Wesley's Anti-Catholicism in Context". Journal of Religious History. 45 (2): 185–210. doi:10.1111/1467-9809.12736. ISSN 0022-4227. S2CID 236399013.
- Oden, Thomas C. (2012). Christ and Salvation. John Wesley's Teachings. Vol. 2. Grand Rapids, MI: Zondervan.
- Oden, Thomas C. (2013). Pastoral Theology. John Wesley's Teachings. Vol. 3. Grand Rapids, MI: Zondervan. ISBN 978-0-310-58709-5.
- Parkes, William (1997). "Watchnight, Covenant Service, and the Love-Feast in Early British Methodism". Wesleyan Theological Journal. 32. 2: 35–58.
- Parkinson, F.M. (1898). "Class Tickets" (PDF). Proceedings of the Wesley Historical Society. 1 (5). Wesley Historical Society: 129–137.
- Patterson, Ronald (1984). The Book of Discipline of the United Methodist Church, 1984. Nashville, TN: United Methodist Publ. House.
- Pollock, John (1989). John Wesley. London: Hodder & Stoughton. ISBN 978-0-340-50272-3.
- Preece, Rod (2008). Sins of the Flesh: A History of Ethical Vegetarian Thought. University of British Columbia Press. ISBN 978-0-7748-5849-6.
- Ratcliffe, Richard (2019). "The Family of John and Charles Wesley". My Wesleyan Methodists.
- Richie, Tony Lee (2003). "John Wesley and Mohammed: A Contemporary Inquiry Concerning Islam". The Asbury Journal. 58 (2): 79–99.
- Ross, Kathy W.; Stacey, Rosemary (1998). "John Wesley and Savannah". Savannah Images Project. Archived from the original on 19 January 2000.
- Ryan, Linda A. (2017). "Kingswood". John Wesley and the Education of Children: Gender, Class and Piety. Taylor & Francis. ISBN 978-1-3516-0729-2.
- Sanders, Fred (31 August 2013). Wesley on the Christian Life: The Heart Renewed in Love. Wheaton, IL: Crossway. ISBN 978-1-4335-2487-5.
- Smith, James-Michael (2010). "Wesley's Doctrine of Christian Perfection" (PDF).
- Southey, Robert (1820). "Wesley in Middle Age". The Life of Wesley: And the Rise and Progress of Methodism. Evert Duyckinck and George Long; Clayton & Kingsland.
- Spiak, Jody (2011). "The Itinerant System: The Method(ists) Behind the Madness". UMC of Milton-Marlboro.
- Stanglin, Keith D.; McCall, Thomas H. (2012). Jacob Arminius: Theologian of Grace. Oxford University Press. ISBN 978-0-19-975567-7.
- Staples, Rob L. (1986). "John Wesley's Doctrine of the Holy Spirit" (PDF). Wesleyan Theological Journal. 21 (1–2): 91–115.
- Stevens, Abel (1858). The History of the Religious Movement of the Eighteenth Century, called Methodism. Vol. 1. London: Carlton & Porter.
- Stoughton, John (1878). Religion in England Under Queen Anne and the Georges, 1702–1800. Vol. 1. Hodder and Stoughton.
- The Asbury Triptych (2019). "John Wesley's Foundry Church". The Asbury Triptych.
- The Guide to Musical Theatre (2014). "Ride! Ride!". The Guide to Musical Theatre.
- The Methodist Church (2020). The Constitutional Practice and Discipline of the Methodist Church. Vol. 2. London: Methodist Publishing. ISBN 978-1-85852-389-7.
- The Methodist Church (2019). "History: Social Justice". Methodist Church in Britain. Archived from the original on 5 October 2016.
- The Methodist Church (2011). "The Holy Club". The Methodist Church in Britain. Archived from the original on 5 December 2023.
- The New Room (2017). "New Room Archives". The New Room Bristol, John Wesley's Chapel.
- Thorsen, Don (2005). The Wesleyan Quadrilateral: Scripture, Tradition, Reason, & Experience as a Model of Evangelical Theology. Lexington, Ky: Emeth Press.
- Thwaites, Penelope (2000). Ride! Ride!. Surrey, England: Somm Recordings. OCLC 844535136.
- Tomkins, Stephen (2003). John Wesley: A Biography. Oxford: Lion Books. ISBN 978-0-7459-5078-5.
- Tooley, Mark (1870). Minutes of Proceedings of the Royal Artillery Institution. Vol. 6. Woolwich: Royal artillery institution.
- Tooley, Mark (2014). "John Wesley and Religious Freedom". First Things.
- Tucker, Robert Leonard (2008). The Separation of the Methodists from the Church of England. Eugene, Oregon: Wipf and Stock Publishers. ISBN 978-1-7252-2404-9.
- Tucker, Ruth A.; Liefeld, Walter L. (2010). Daughters of the Church: Women and Ministry from New Testament Times to the Present. Grand Rapids, MI: Zondervan. ISBN 978-0-310-87746-2.
- Tucker, Karen B. Westerfield (July 1996). "John Wesley's Prayer Book Revision: The Text in Context" (PDF). Methodist History. 34 (4). General Commission on Archives and History, United Methodist Church: 230–247.
- Tyerman, Luke (1876) [1870]. The Life and Times of the Rev. John Wesley, M. A., Founder of the Methodists. Hodder and Stoughton.
- UMC of Indiana (2019). "The Christmas Gift: A New Church". The United Methodist Church of Indiana. Archived from the original on 11 December 2019.
- Wallace, Charles Jr (1997). Susanna Wesley: the complete writings. New York: Oxford University Press.
- Waltz, Alan K. (1991). "Aldersgate". A dictionary for United Methodists. Nashville: Abingdon Press.
- Watson, Philip S. (1990). Anatomy of a Conversion: The Message and Mission of John & Charles Wesley. Grand Rapids, Mich.: Francis Asbury Press (now Zondervan). ISBN 0-310-74991-3.
- Wells, J. C. (2008). Longman Pronunciation Dictionary (3rd ed.). Harlow, UK: Pearson.
- Wesley, John (1915). Augustine Birrell (ed.). Letters of John Wesley. New York: Hodder and Stoughton.
- —— (1744). Primitive Physic, Or, An Easy and Natural Method of Curing Most Diseases. London.
- —— (1759). The Desideratum: Or Electricity Made Plain and Useful by a Lover of Mankind and of Common Sense. London. Online link is to the 1871 edition. |
- —— (1766). A Plain Account of Christian Perfection: As Believed and Taught by the Rev. Mr. John Wesley from the Year 1725 to the Year 1765 (2 ed.). Bristol.
- —— (1779). A Collection of Hymns for the Use of the People called Methodists. London: Wesleyan Conference Office.
- —— (1931) [1721–1791]. The Letters of John Wesley. London: Epworth Press.
- —— (1774). Thoughts Upon Slavery. Re-printed in Philadelphia, with notes, and sold by Joseph Crukshank.
- —— (1826). The Works of the Rev. John Wesley: in ten volumes. New York: New York : Printed by J. & J. Harper.
- ——; Benson, Joseph (1827). The Works of the Rev. John Wesley: in ten volumes. New York: J. & J. Harper.
- —— (1831). "Wesley's Rules for Band-Societies". In Emory, John (ed.). The Works of the Reverend John Wesley, A. M. Vol. 5. New York: B. Waugh and T. Mason.
- —— (1835). Emory, John (ed.). The Works of the Reverend John Wesley, A. M. Vol. 4. New York: B. Waugh and T. Mason.
- ——; Jackson, Thomas (1979). The Works of John Wesley (1872). Vol. 1. Kansas City, Mo: Beacon Hill's.
- ——; Jackson, Thomas (1979b). The Works of John Wesley (1872). Vol. 11. Kansas City, Mo: Beacon Hill's.
- ——; Whaling, Frank (1981). John and Charles Wesley: Selected Prayers, Hymns, Journal Notes, Sermons, Letters and Treatises. New Jersey: Paulist Press. ISBN 0-8091-2368-1.
- —— (1984). Outler, Albert C. (ed.). The Works of John Wesley. Vol. 1. Nashville, TN: Abingdon Press.
- —— (2000a) [1738]. Wesley's Journal. Grand Rapids, MI: Christian Classics Ethereal Library.
- Wesley, Charles (2000b). John R. Tyson (ed.). Charles Wesley: A Reader. New York: Oxford University Press. ISBN 978-0-19-802102-5.
- Wesley, Cindy (2015). "What have the sermons of John Wesley ever done for us? John Wesley's sermons and Methodist doctrine" (PDF). Holiness. 1 (1). Cambridge: Wesley House: 131–140. ISSN 2058-5969.
- Wesleyan Methodist Magazine (1836). Wesleyan-Methodist Magazine: Being a Continuation of the Arminian or Methodist Magazine First Publ. by John Wesley. London.
- Wesley's Chapel (2017). "History". Wesleysheritage.org.uk. Wesley's Chapel and Leysian Mission.
- Wiersbe, Warren W. (1984). The Wycliffe handbook of preaching and preachers. Chicago: Moody Press.
- Wiley, H. Orton (1940). Christian theology. Vol. 2. Kansas City, MO: Beacon Hill Press.
- Williams, Robert J. (2012). "Marking John Wesley's birthday in his words". UM News.
- Yates, Kelly Diehl (2023). The Limits of a Catholic Spirit: John Wesley, Methodism, and Catholicism. Cambridge: Lutterworth Press.
- Yoon, Young Hwi (2012). "The Spread of Antislavery Sentiment through Proslavery Tracts in the Transatlantic Evangelical Community, 1740s–1770s". Church History. 81 (2): 355. doi:10.1017/S0009640712000637. S2CID 154362919.
- Young, Francis (2015). Inferior Office: A History of Deacons in the Church of England. ISD LLC. ISBN 978-0-227-90372-8.
- Yrigoyen, Charles (1996). "Wesley John, "Thoughts Upon Slavery"". John Wesley: Holiness of Heart and Life. New York: Mission Education and Cultivation Program Dept. for the Women's Division, General Board of Global Ministries, United Methodist Church.
