= Samuel Annesley =

Puritan and nonconformist pastor

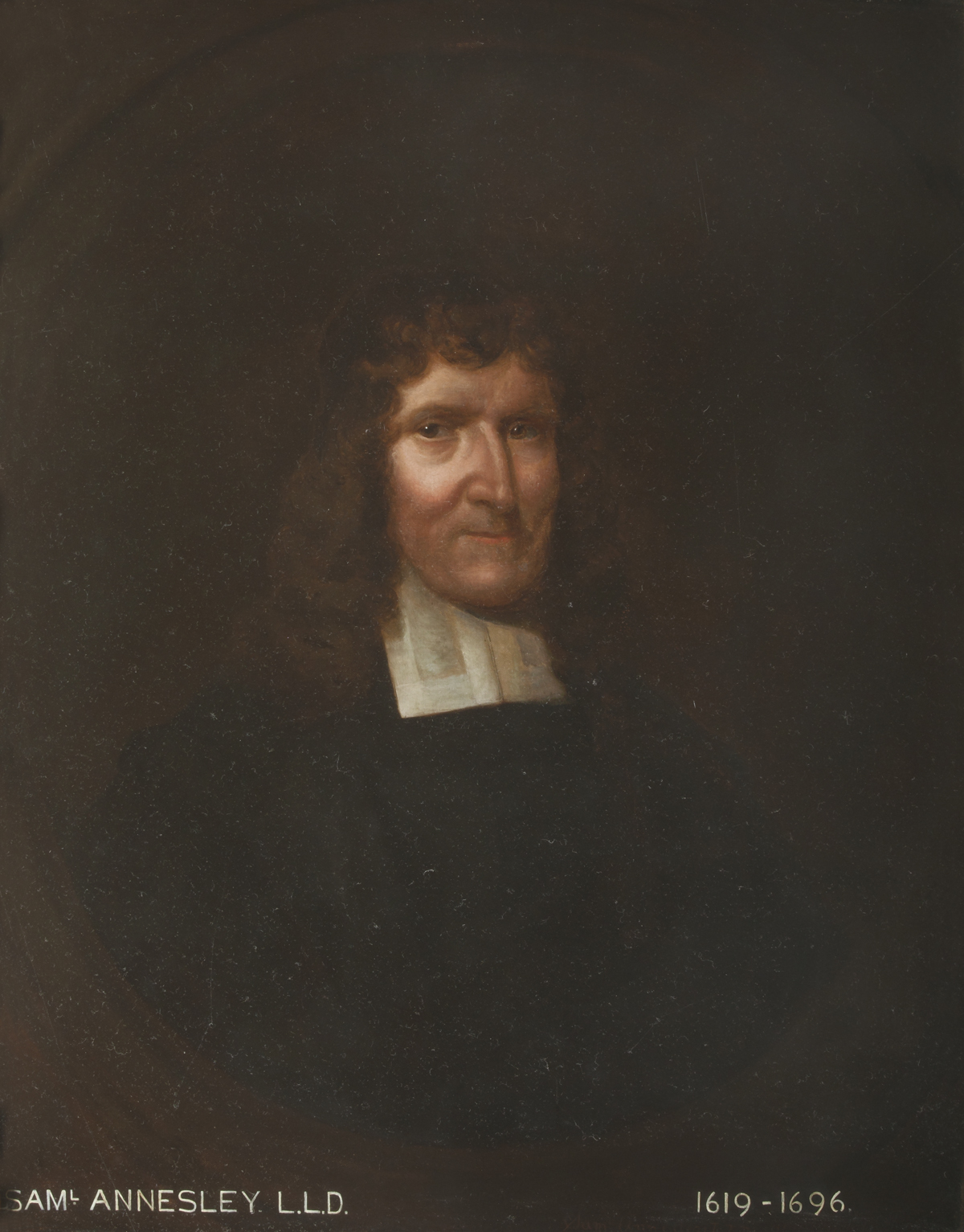

Samuel Annesley (c. 1620 – 1696) was an English Puritan and nonconformist pastor, best known for the sermons he collected as the series of Morning Exercises.

== Life ==
Annesley was born in Haseley, England, in 1620 and christened on 26 March. He was the son of John and Judith Aneley. Betty Young records the surname as Anerlye (not to be confused with John Annesley, the brother of Arthur Annesley, 1st Earl of Anglesey, a mistake that many historians made). His father, a wealthy man, died when he was four years old, although this is disputed by Young who notes that John Anerlye was signing the parish registers as church warden as late as 1629 He started to read the bible at an early age. In Michaelmas term, 1635, he was admitted a student at The Queen's College, Oxford, and there he proceeded successively B.A. and M.A. He received his BA on 21 November 1639 In December 1642 he was authorised as special preacher at Chatham He underwent Presbyterian ordination, on 18 December 1644, and subscribed by seven Presbyterian ministers, having possibly already received Episcopal ordination, and became chaplain to Robert Rich, 2nd Earl of Warwick, then admiral of the parliament's fleet, on the Globe.

He succeeded Griffin Higgs in the living of Cliffe, Kent, when Higgs was ejected for his loyalty to the king and treason to the Commonwealth. On 26 July 1648 he preached a Fast-day sermon before the House of Commons, and around this time Oxford gave him an honorary doctorate. He was also again at sea with the Earl of Warwick, who was in action against the royalist navy and was on the George off the Netherlands between August and December 1648.

Annesley was strongly opposed to the execution of Charles I and held Cromwell in low opinion describing him as "the arrantest hypocrite that ever the Church of Christ was pestered with". He lost the living at Cliffe, and in 1652 became incumbent at St John the Evangelist Friday Street.

In 1657 he was nominated by Oliver Cromwell lecturer of St Paul's, and in 1658 was presented by Richard Cromwell to the vicarage of St Giles, Cripplegate. He was presented again there after the Stuart Restoration, but was ejected after the Act of Uniformity 1662.

He preached semi-privately, but his goods were distrained for keeping a conventicle, a meeting-house in Little St Helen's. In 1669 he was preaching in Spitalfields to a congregation estimated at 800. Following the Declaration of Indulgence in 1672 Annesley was licensed as a Presbyterian 'teacher', but when the Declaration was revoked in 1673 the licence was revoked and this led to the distraint of his fairly considerable property. He continued however with his financial support of others and his support of nonconformity in London with a remarkable reputation as a preacher. Newton notes that 'Annesley's sermons repay careful analysis, for they are choice sample of Puritan preaching: biblical, pastoral, practical, and grounded in the daily life of the people'

He was a major influence on the views and perhaps even the prose style of Daniel Defoe. One exercise required Defoe to take notes of the weekly sermons and reconstruct the whole argument point by point from the notes. Defoe wrote in 1697 a pamphlet on "The Character of the late Dr Samuel Annesley by way of Elegy".

== Death ==
Annesley died on 31 December 1696. His funeral sermon was given by Daniel Williams, while Daniel Defoe, a member of his congregation, wrote an elegy on his death:

The sacred bow he so divinely drew,
That every shot both hit and overthrew;
His native candour and familiar style,
Which do so often his hearers' hours beguile,
Charmed us with godliness, and while he spake,
We loved the doctrine for the speaker's sake.

and

A Pleasing Smile sate ever on his brow,
A sign that chearful Peace was lodged below.

He was buried in St Leonard's churchyard, Shoreditch, in an unmarked plot.

Annesley had a personal library. Upon his death, Annesley's library was sold by auction in London on 18 March 1697. The sale catalog includes 1256 lots plus 101 volumes of mostly Latin and English theological pamphlets.

== Works ==
Annesley's writings consisted of sermons separately published, and in the various collections under the title Morning Exercises at Cripplegate and biographical works including a life of Thomas Brand. In addition to furnishing the first sermon for these Morning Exercises, Annesley edited this volume of sermons from prominent Puritan ministers considering practical issues of conscience and three sequel volumes, for each of which he provided the first sermon.

== Family ==
Annesley married Mary Hill on 21 July 1641 in All Hallows, Bread Street, London. A son, Samuel, was baptised in Cliffe (30 November 1645), and there are records of the burial of Mary (2 December 1646) and Samuel (1 February 1649/50). There is no record of his second marriage but the baptism of their second daughter, Bithia, is recorded at the church of St John the Evangelist, Friday Street, London (near All Hallows), where the surname is recorded as Ansloe. He had a large family and Young has identified at least nine who survived to adulthood, of whom one daughter, Elizabeth, married John Dunton, while another daughter, Susanna Wesley, became the wife of the Rev. Samuel Wesley, and the mother of John Wesley and Charles Wesley, the founders of Methodism. His eldest son, also called Samuel Annesley, obtained a position in the employ of the East India Company in Bombay and is the source of the supposed lost legacy of the Wesleys.

Wesley family tree
The family tree of the Wesleys, founders of Methodism.

Bartholomew Westley b.1596	Anne Colley
? a (daughter of John White)	John; Westley b.1638	Samuel Annesley b.1620
Timothy Wesley (born 1659)	Matthew Wesley	Samuel; Wesley (b.1662)	Susanna; Wesley (b.1669)
Samuel (Sammy); Wesley (b.1690)	Emilia (Emily); Wesley (b.1692)	Mary (Molly); Wesley (b.1696)	Anne; Wesley (b.1702)	Martha; Wesley (b.1706)	Kezia; Wesley (b.1709)
Nine other children (deceased)	Susanna; Wesley (b.1695)	Mehetabel; Wesley (b.1697)	John; Wesley (b.1703)	Mary; Vazeille	Charles; Wesley (b.1707)	Sarah; Gwynne
Seven other children (deceased)	Charles Wesley (b.1757)	Sarah (Sally) Wesley (b.1759)
Charlotte; Louise; Martin	Samuel Wesley (b.1766)	Sarah; Suter
Three children	Samuel Sebastian Wesley (b.1810)

Explanatory notes and reference sources
