= Samuel Wesley (poet, died 1735) =

Clergyman of the Church of England

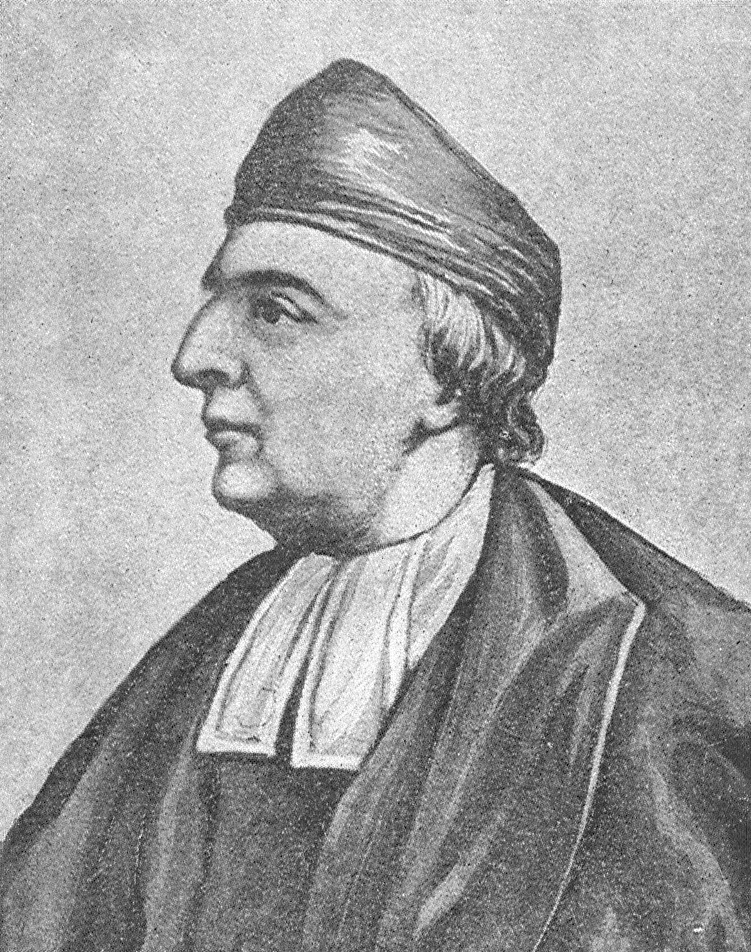
- Born: 17 December 1662; Dorset, England
- Died: 25 April 1735 (aged 72); Epworth, Lincolnshire, England
- Education: Exeter College, Oxford; Corpus Christi College, Cambridge
- Occupations: Cleric, author
- Spouse: Susanna Wesley (m. 1688)
- Children: 19, including John Wesley, Charles Wesley, Samuel Wesley (the Younger) and Mehetabel Wesley Wright
- Parent: John Westley (father)
- Religion: Anglicanism (Church of England)
- Ordained: 17 December 1662

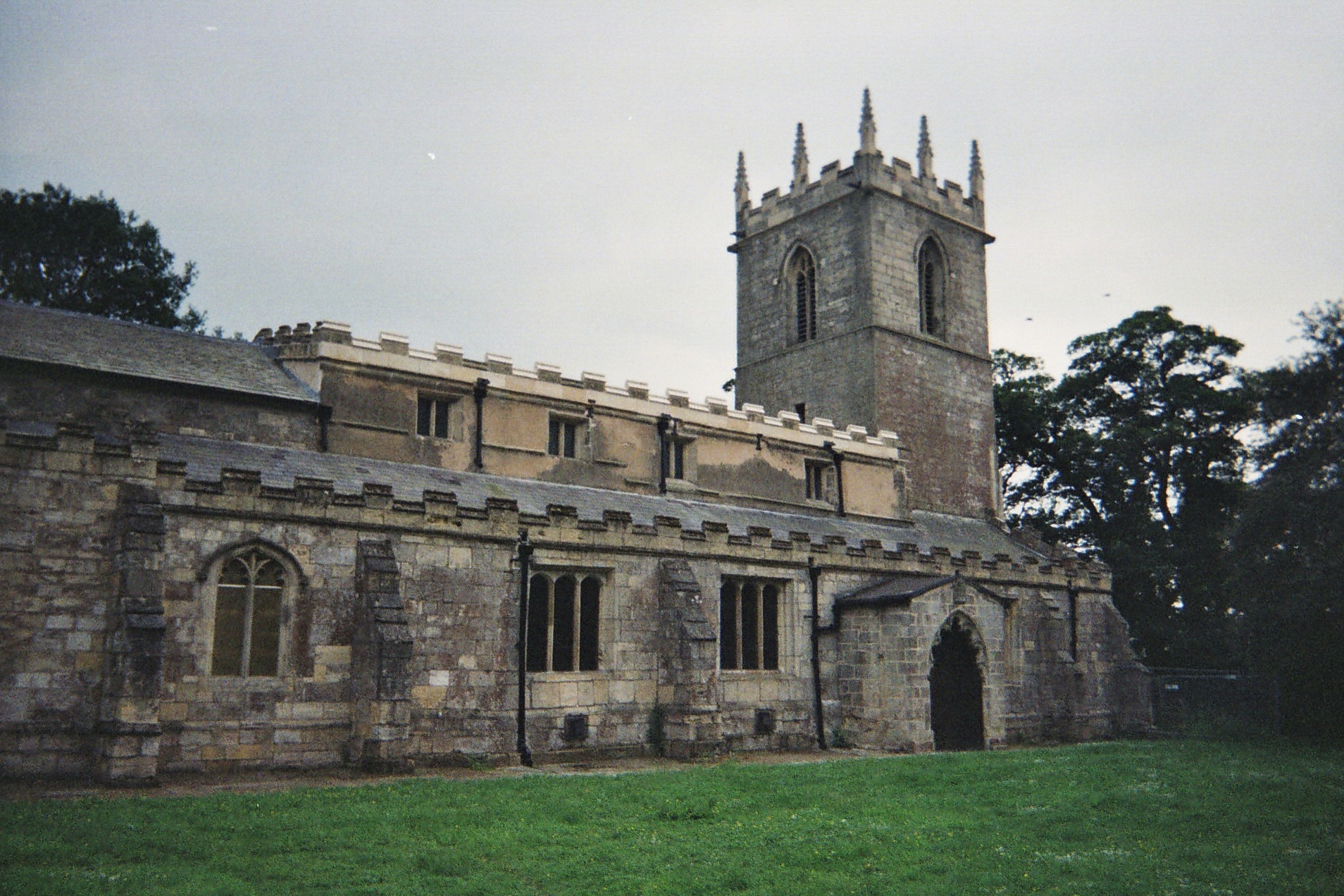
St Andrew's Church, Epworth, Lincolnshire, in which churchyard Samuel Wesley is buried

Samuel Wesley (17 December 1662 – 25 April 1735) was a clergyman of the Church of England, a poet, and a writer. He was the father of John Wesley and Charles Wesley, the founders of Methodism.

== Family and early life ==
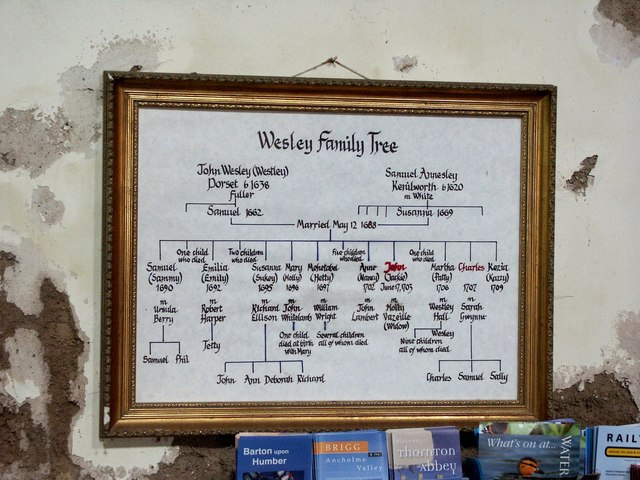
Interior of St Andrew, Epworth: the Wesley Family Tree

Samuel Wesley was the second son of Rev. John Westley or Wesley, rector of Winterborne Whitechurch, Dorset. His mother was the daughter of John White, the rector of Trinity Church, Dorchester.

Following grammar school education in Dorchester, Wesley was sent away from home to prepare for ministerial training under Theophilus Gale. Gale's death in 1678 forestalled this plan. Instead, he attended another grammar school. After that, he studied at dissenting academies under Edward Veel in Stepney and then Charles Morton in Newington Green, where Gale had lived. Daniel Defoe also attended Morton's school. This school was situated "probably on the site of the current Unitarian church", contemporaneously with Wesley. Samuel resigned his place and his annual scholarship among the Dissenters. After that, he walked all the way to Oxford, where he enrolled at Exeter College as a "poor scholar". He functioned as a "servitor", which means he sustained himself financially by waiting upon wealthy students. He also published a small book of poems, entitled Maggots: or Poems on Several Subjects never before Handled in 1685. The unusual title is explained in a few lines from the first page of the work:

In his own defense the author writes
Because when the foul maggot bites
He ne'er can rest in quiet:
Which makes him make so sad a face
He'd beg your worship or your grace
Unsight, unseen, to buy it

Wesley married Susanna Annesley in 1688. He fathered, among others, Samuel (the younger), Mehetabel, John and Charles Wesley. He had 19 children, nine of whom died in infancy. Three boys and seven girls survived.

In 1688 he became curate at St. Botolph's, Aldersgate, London, serving there for about one year. In 1689 he was made chaplain on a British Man-o-war. In 1690 he became curate at Newington Butts, Surrey. Then, in 1691 the rector of South Ormsby, Lincolnshire. By 1697 he was resident as rector of Epworth, Lincolnshire.

In 1697 he was appointed to the living at Epworth, Lincolnshire through the benevolence of Queen Mary. He may have come to the queen's attention because of his heroic poem, "The Life of Christ" (1693). He dedicated this poem to her. Wesley's high-church liturgies, academic proclivities, and loyalist Tory politics were a complete mismatch for some of his illiterate parishioners. He was not warmly received, and his ministry was not widely appreciated. Wesley was soon deep in debt and much of his life would be spent trying to make financial ends meet. In 1709 his parsonage was destroyed by fire, and his son John was barely rescued from the flames. The parsonage was rebuilt and is now known as the Old Rectory, Epworth.

Wesley family tree
The family tree of the Wesleys, founders of Methodism.

Bartholomew Westley b.1596	Anne Colley
? a (daughter of John White)	John; Westley b.1638	Samuel Annesley b.1620
Timothy Wesley (born 1659)	Matthew Wesley	Samuel; Wesley (b.1662)	Susanna; Wesley (b.1669)
Samuel (Sammy); Wesley (b.1690)	Emilia (Emily); Wesley (b.1692)	Mary (Molly); Wesley (b.1696)	Anne; Wesley (b.1702)	Martha; Wesley (b.1706)	Kezia; Wesley (b.1709)
Nine other children (deceased)	Susanna; Wesley (b.1695)	Mehetabel; Wesley (b.1697)	John; Wesley (b.1703)	Mary; Vazeille	Charles; Wesley (b.1707)	Sarah; Gwynne
Seven other children (deceased)	Charles Wesley (b.1757)	Sarah (Sally) Wesley (b.1759)
Charlotte; Louise; Martin	Samuel Wesley (b.1766)	Sarah; Suter
Three children	Samuel Sebastian Wesley (b.1810)

Explanatory notes and reference sources

== Career ==
His poetic career began in 1685 with the publication of Maggots, a collection of juvenile verses on trivial subjects, the preface to which apologizes to the reader because the book is neither grave nor gay. The poems appear to be an attempt to prove that poetic language can create beauty out of the most revolting subject. The first poem, "On a Maggot", is composed in hudibrastics, with a diction obviously Butlerian, and it is followed by facetious poetic dialogues and by Pindarics of the Cowleian sort but on such subjects as "On the Grunting of a Hog".

In 1688 Wesley took his B.A, at Exeter College, Oxford, following which he became a naval chaplain and, in 1690, rector of South Ormsby. In 1694 he took his MA from Corpus Christi College, Cambridge, and the following year he became rector of Epworth. During the run of the Athenian Gazette (1691–1697) he joined with Richard Sault and John Norris in assisting John Dunton, the promoter of the undertaking.

His second venture in poetry, the Life of Our Blessed Lord and Saviour, an epic largely in heroic couplets with a prefatory discourse on heroic poetry, appeared in 1693, was reissued in 1694, and was honoured with a second edition in 1697. In 1695 he dutifully came forward with Elegies, lamenting the deaths of Queen Mary II and Archbishop Tillotson. The Epistle to a Friend Concerning Poetry (1700) was followed by at least four other volumes of verse, the last of which was issued in 1717. His poetry appears to have had readers on a certain level, but it stirred up little pleasure among wits, writers, or critics. Judith Drake confessed that she was lulled to sleep by Blackmore's Prince Arthur and by Wesley's "heroics" (Essay in Defence of the Female Sex, 1696, p. 50). And he was satirized as a mere poetaster in Garth's Dispensary, in Swift's The Battle of the Books, and in the earliest issues of the Dunciad.

== Controversy ==
For a few years in the early eighteenth century, Wesley found himself in the vortex of controversy. Brought up in the dissenting tradition, he had swerved into conformity at some point during the 1680s, possibly under the influence of Tillotson, whom he greatly admired (cf. Epistle to a Friend, pp. 5–6). In 1702 there appeared his Letter from a Country Divine to his friend in London concerning the education of dissenters in their private academies, apparently written about 1693. This attack upon dissenting academies was published at an unfortunate time, when the public mind was inflamed by the intolerance of overzealous churchmen. Wesley was furiously answered; he replied in A Defence of a Letter (1704), and again in A Reply to Mr. Palmer's Vindication (1707). It is scarcely to Wesley's credit that in this quarrel he stood shoulder to shoulder with that most hot-headed of all contemporary bigots, Henry Sacheverell. His prominence in the controversy earned him the ironic compliments of Daniel Defoe, who recalled that our "Mighty Champion of this very High-Church Cause" had once written a poem to satirize frenzied Tories (Review, II, no. 87, 22 September 1705). About a week later, Defoe, having got wind of a collection being taken up for Wesley – who in consequence of a series of misfortunes was badly in debt – intimated that High-Church pamphleteering had turned out very profitably for both Lesley and Wesley (2 October 1705). But in such snarling and bickering Wesley was out of his element, and he seems to have avoided future quarrels.

His literary criticism is small in bulk. But though it is neither brilliant nor well written (Wesley apparently composed at a break-neck clip), it is not without interest. Pope observed in 1730 that he was a "learned" man (letter to Swift, in Works, ed. Elwin-Courthope, VII, 184). The observation was correct, but it should be added that Wesley matured at the end of an age famous for its great learning, an age whose most distinguished poet was so much the scholar that he appeared more the pedant than the gentleman to critics of the succeeding era; Wesley was not singular for erudition among his seventeenth-century contemporaries.

=== "Essay on Heroic Poetry" ===
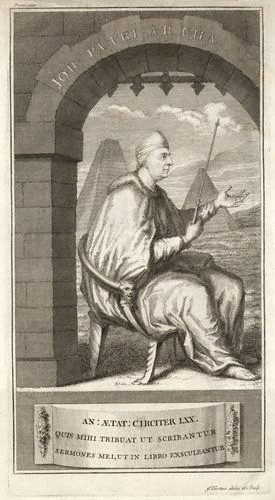
Engraving of Wesley by George Vertue (1732)

The "Essay on Heroic Poetry", serving as Preface to The Life of Our Blessed Lord and Saviour, reveals something of its author's erudition. Among the critics, he was familiar with Aristotle, Horace, Longinus, Dionysius of Halicarnassus, Heinsius, Bochart, Balzac, Rapin, Le Bossu, and Boileau. But this barely hints at the extent of his learning. In the notes on the poem itself the author displays an interest in classical scholarship, Biblical commentary, ecclesiastical history, scientific inquiry, linguistics and philology, British antiquities, and research into the history, customs, architecture, and geography of the Holy Land; he shows, an intimate acquaintance with Grotius, Henry Hammond, Joseph Mede, Spanheim, Sherlock, Lightfoot, and Gregory, with Philo, Josephus, Fuller, Walker, Camden, and Athanasius Kircher; and he shows an equal readiness to draw upon Ralph Cudworth's True Intellectual System and Robert Boyle's new theories concerning the nature of light. In view of such a breadth of knowledge it is somewhat surprising to find him quoting as extensively as he does in the "Essay" from Le Bossu and Rapin, and apparently leaning heavily upon them.

The "Essay" was composed at a time when the prestige of Rymer and neo-Aristotelianism in England was already declining, and though Wesley expressed some admiration for Rapin and Le Bossu, he is by no means docile under their authority. Whatever the weight of authority, he says, "I see no cause why Poetry should not be brought to the Test [of reason], as well as Divinity...." As to the sacred example of Homer, who based his great epic on mythology, Wesley remarks, "But this [mythology] being now antiquated, I cannot think we are oblig'd superstitiously to follow his Example, any more than to make Horses speak, as he does that of Achilles." To the question of the formidable Boileau, "What Pleasure can it be to hear the howlings of repining Lucifer?" our critic responds flippantly, "I think 'tis easier to answer than to find out what shew of Reason he had for asking it, or why Lucifer mayn't howl as pleasantly as either Cerberus, or Knoeladus." Without hesitation or apology he takes issue with Rapin's conception of Decorum in the epic. But Wesley is empiricist as well as rationalist, and the judgment of authority can be upset by appeal to the court of experience. To Balzac's suggestion that, to avoid difficult and local proper names in poetry, generalized terms be used, such as Ill-luck for the Fates and the Foul Fiend for Lucifer, our critic replies with jaunty irony, "... and whether this wou'd not sound extremely Heroical, I leave any Man to judge", and thus he dismisses the matter. Similarly, when Rapin objects to Tasso's mingling of lyric softness in the majesty of the epic, Wesley points out sharply that no man of taste will part with the fine scenes of tender love in Tasso, Dryden, Ovid, Ariosto, and Spenser "for the sake of a fancied Regularity". He had set out to defend the Biblical epic, the Christian epic, and the propriety of Christian machines in epic, and no rules or authority could deter him. As good an example as any of his independence of mind can be seen in a note on Bk. I, apropos of the poet's use of obsolete words (Life of Our Blessed Lord, 1697, p. 27): It may be in vicious imitation of Milton and Spenser, he says in effect, but I have a fondness for old words, they please my ear, and that is all the reason I can give for employing them.

Wesley's resistance to a strict application of authority and the rules grew partly out of the rationalistic and empirical temper of Englishmen in his age, but it also sprang from his learning. From various sources he drew the theory that Greek and Latin were but corrupted forms of ancient Phoenician, and that the degeneracy of Greek and Latin in turn had produced all, or most, of the present European tongues (ibid., p. 354). In addition, he believed that the Greeks had derived some of their thought from older civilizations, and specifically that Plato had received many of his notions from the Jews (ibid., p. 230)—an idea which recalls the argument that Dryden in Religio Laioi had employed against the deists, furthermore, he had, like many of his learned contemporaries, a profound respect for Hebrew culture and the sublimity of the Hebrew scriptures, going so far as to remark in the "Essay on Heroic Poetry" that "most, even of [the heathen poets'] beat Fancies and Images, as well as Names, were borrow'd from the Antient Hebrew Poetry and Divinity." In short, however faulty his particular conclusions, he had arrived at an historical viewpoint, from which it was no longer possible to regard the classical standards - much less the standards of French critics - as having the holy sanction of Nature herself.

=== Literary tastes ===
Some light is shed on the literary tastes of his period by the Epistle to a Friend Concerning Poetry (1700) and the Essay on Heroic Poetry (1697), which with a few exceptions were in accord with the prevailing current. The Life of Our Blessed Lord shows strongly the influence of Cowley's Davideis. Wesley's great admiration persisted after the tide had turned away from Cowley; and his liking for the "divine Herbert" and for Crashaw represented the tastes of sober and unfashionable readers. Although he professed unbounded admiration for Homer as the greatest genius in nature, in practice he seemed more inclined to follow the lead of Cowley, Virgil, and Vida. Although there was much in Ariosto that he enjoyed, he preferred Tasso; the irregularities in both, however, he felt bound to deplore. To Spenser's Faerie Queene he allowed extraordinary merit. If the plan of it was noble, he thought, and the mark of a comprehensive genius, yet the action of the poem seemed confused. Nevertheless, like Prior later, Wesley was inclined to suspend judgment on this point because the poem had been left incomplete. To Spenser's "thoughts" he paid the highest tribute, and to his "Expressions flowing natural and easie, with such a prodigious Poetical Copia as never any other must expect to enjoy." Like most of the Augustans Wesley did not care greatly for Paradise Regained, but he partly atoned by his praise for Paradise Lost, which was an "original" and therefore "above the common Rules". Though defective in its action, it was resplendent with sublime thoughts perhaps superior to any in Virgil or Homer, and full of incomparable and exquisitely moving passages. In spite of his belief that Milton's blank verse was a mistake, making for looseness and incorrectness, he borrowed lines and images from it, and in Bk. IV of The Life of Our Blessed Lord he incorporated a whole passage of Milton's blank verse in the midst of his heroic couplets.

Wesley's attitude toward Dryden deserves a moment's pause. In the "Essay on Heroic Poetry" he observed that a speech of Satan's in Paradise Lost is nearly equalled in Dryden's State of Innocence. Later in the same essay he credited a passage in Dryden's King Arthur with showing an improvement upon Tasso. There is no doubt as to his vast respect for the greatest living poet, but his remarks do not indicate that he ranked Dryden with Virgil, Tasso, or Milton; for he recognized as well as we that the power to embellish and to imitate successfully does not constitute the highest excellence in poetry. In the Epistle to a Friend he affirmed his admiration for Dryden's matchless style, his harmony, his lofty strains, his youthful fire, and even his wit - in the main, qualities of style and expression. But by 1700 Wesley had absorbed enough of the new puritanism that was rising in England to qualify his praise; now he deprecated the looseness and indecency of the poetry, and called upon the poet to repent. One other point calls for comment. Wesley's scheme for Christian machinery in the epic, as described in the "Essay on Heroic Poetry", is remarkably similar to Dryden's. Dryden's had appeared in the essay on satire prefaced to his translation of Juvenal, published late in October 1692; Wesley's scheme appeared soon after June 1693.

The Epistle to a Friend Concerning Poetry is neither startling nor contemptible; it has, in fact, much more to say than the rhymed treatises on verse by Roscommon and Mulgrave. Its remarks on Genius are fresh, though tantalizing in their brevity, and it defends the Moderns with both neatness and energy. Much of its advice is cautious and commonplace - but such was the tradition of the poetical treatise on verse. Appearing within two years of Collier's first attack upon the stage, it reinforces some of that worthy's contentions, but we are not aware of its having had much effect.

== Theology ==
Samuel Wesley held Anglican Arminianist views. The Arminian Hugo Grotius, was his favourite biblical commentator. Through his sermons, he demonstrated beliefs in the tenets of Arminianism and especially in its distinctive prevenient grace.

== See also ==
- Charles Wesley
- John Wesley

== Notes and references ==
This material was originally from the introduction of Augustan Reprint Society's edition of An Epistle to a Friend Concerning Poetry (1700) and the Essay on Heroic Poetry (second edition, 1697), volume 5 in the Augustan Reprint series, part of series 2, Essay on Poetry: No. 2, first printed in 1947. It was written by Edward Niles Hooker. It was published in the US without a copyright notice, which at the time meant it fell into the public domain.

=== Sources ===
- Allardyce, Alex (2008). The Village that Changed the World: A History of Newington Green, London N16. Newington Green Action Group. ISBN 978-0-9559120-0-9.
- Horton, Michael Scott; Geisler, Norman L.; Ashby, Stephen M.; Harper, J. Stephen (2002). J. Matthew Pinson (ed.). Four Views on Eternal Security. Harper Collins. ISBN 978-0-310-23439-5.
- Torpy, Arthur Alan (2009). The Prevenient Piety of Samuel Wesley, Sr. Plymouth: Scarecrow Press. ISBN 9780810860582.
- Tyson, John R. (2007). Assist Me to Proclaim: The Life and Hymns of Charles Wesley. Wm. B. Eerdmans. ISBN 978-0-8028-2939-9.
