= Bartholomew Westley =

English ejected minister

Rev. Bartholomew Westley (1596 – 13 February 1680) was an English ejected minister. He was also a great-grandfather to Charles Wesley and John Wesley, the founders of Methodism.

== Life ==
He was the third son of Sir Herbert Westley of Westleigh, Devon, and his wife Elizabeth de Wellesley of Dangan, County Meath.

He studied physics, medicine and theology at Oxford. He lived for some time at Bridport and is known to have preached in the town's western suburb of Allington. The pulpit which he used there is still preserved in the Wesleyan school-room at Bridport.

He held the sequestered rectories of Charmouth (from 1640) and Catherston (from 1650), in Dorset, from both of which he was ejected in 1662. He continued to preach as a Nonconformist. He lived in Charmouth for some time where he practised medicine. He continued preaching in the West Dorset area. He was eventually forced to leave Charmouth by the Five Mile Act. He was dubbed a fanatic and a "puny parson", because of his small stature. The last years of his life were spent in seclusion at Lyme Regis, where he died at about the age of eighty-five; he was buried there on 15 February 1680.

== Family ==
He married (1619) Anne, daughter of Sir Henry Colley of Carbury, County Kildare, and granddaughter of Adam Loftus, primate of Ireland. They had one son, Rev. John Westley, also an ejected minister. John was the grandfather of John Wesley, and Charles Wesley, the founders of Methodism. He was also the father of Samuel Wesley the poet.

Bartholomew later married a woman named Mary, who died a few months after he did.

Wesley family tree
The family tree of the Wesleys, founders of Methodism.

Bartholomew Westley b.1596	Anne Colley
? a (daughter of John White)	John; Westley b.1638	Samuel Annesley b.1620
Timothy Wesley (born 1659)	Matthew Wesley	Samuel; Wesley (b.1662)	Susanna; Wesley (b.1669)
Samuel (Sammy); Wesley (b.1690)	Emilia (Emily); Wesley (b.1692)	Mary (Molly); Wesley (b.1696)	Anne; Wesley (b.1702)	Martha; Wesley (b.1706)	Kezia; Wesley (b.1709)
Nine other children (deceased)	Susanna; Wesley (b.1695)	Mehetabel; Wesley (b.1697)	John; Wesley (b.1703)	Mary; Vazeille	Charles; Wesley (b.1707)	Sarah; Gwynne
Seven other children (deceased)	Charles Wesley (b.1757)	Sarah (Sally) Wesley (b.1759)
Charlotte; Louise; Martin	Samuel Wesley (b.1766)	Sarah; Suter
Three children	Samuel Sebastian Wesley (b.1810)

Explanatory notes and reference sources
