= Sarah Wesley =

Wife of Charles Wesley

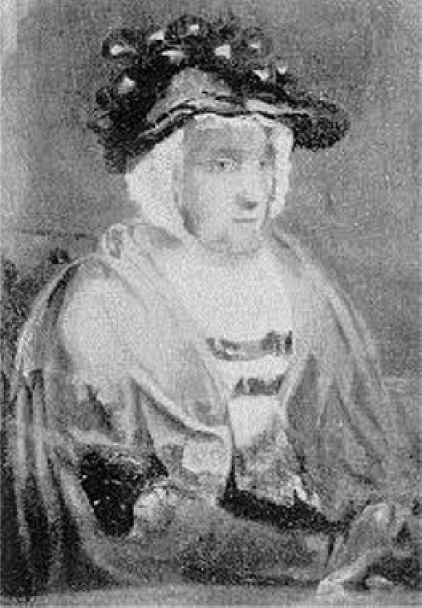
- Born: 1726; Garth, Brecknockshire, Wales
- Died: 28 December 1822 (aged 95–96); Marylebone, London, England
- Children: Charles Wesley junior, Samuel Wesley and Sarah Wesley
- Parent(s): Marmaduke Gwynne and Sarah Evans

Sarah Wesley, née Gwynne, also known as Sally Wesley (1726 – 28 December 1822), was the wife of Charles Wesley, brother of John Wesley, the main founder of Methodism. The daughter of a wealthy family, Wesley once performed musically for George III and passed this talent onto two of her sons, both of whom were musical prodigies.

== Life ==
Sarah Wesley was born in Garth, Brecknockshire, to Sarah (née Evans) and Marmaduke Gwynne. Marmaduke was a wealthy man and a committed Anglican who employed his own chaplain. A local magistrate, he went to arrest Howell Harris for stirring up sedition, but while listening to Harris' sermon was converted to his beliefs. He brought Harris back to his house where his wife refused to see him. The only member of Gwynne's family who did listen was his daughter, Sarah.

By 1747 her father was offering accommodation to evangelical travellers and for five days in August he offered a place to stay to Charles and his brother John Wesley. The age gap between Sarah and Charles Wesley was nearly twenty years but they were both attracted to each other. Charles returned in the following April and proposed marriage. Sarah's mother had been unenthusiastic about her husband's interest in the evangelical revival that was taking place, but she was happy to see Charles Wesley become her son-in-law.

== Marriage ==
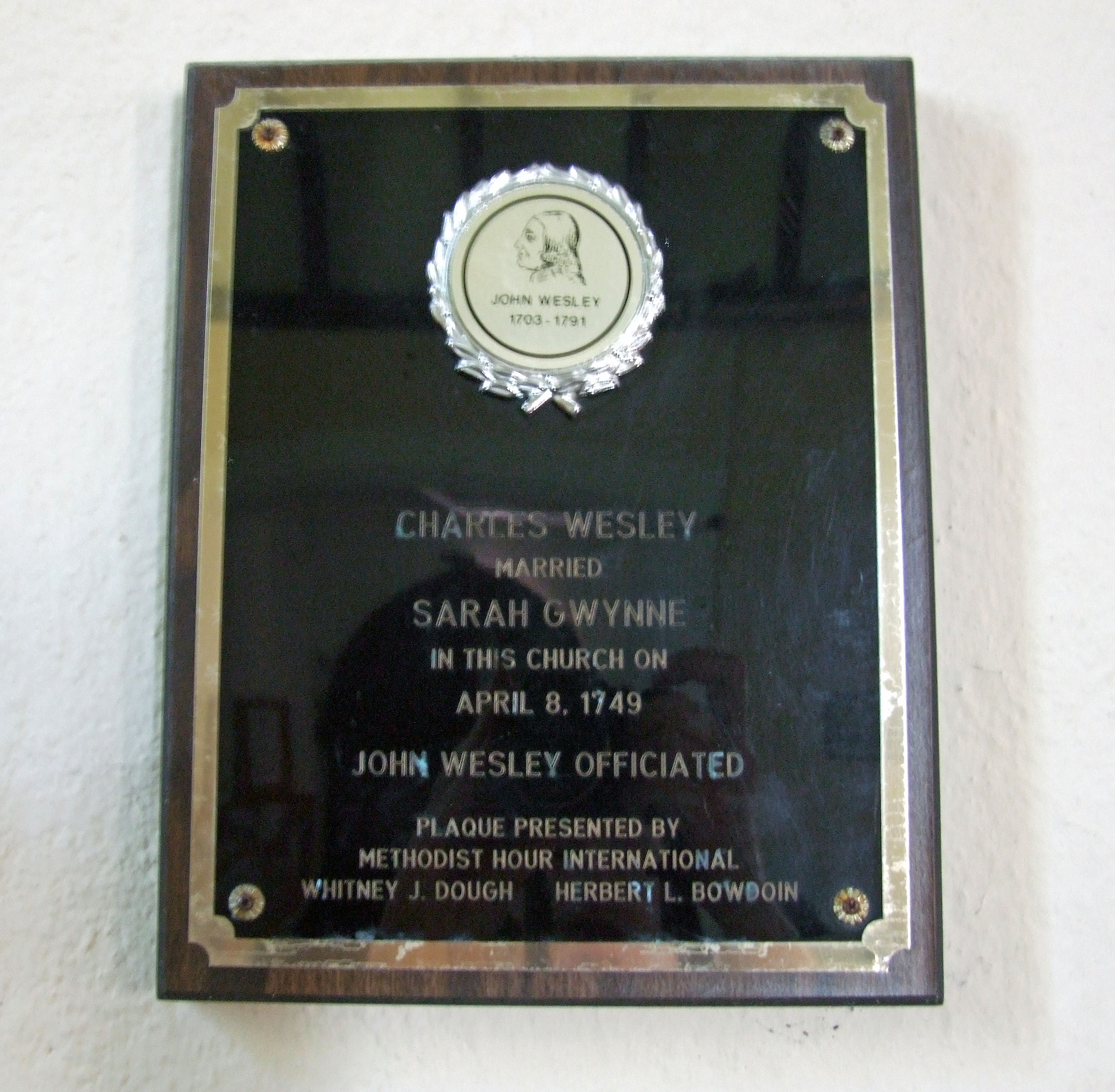
Plaque at Llanlleonfel church, to the west of Builth Wells

Charles and Sarah were married in 1749 at the small and lonely parish church at Llanlleonfel near Garth, which is 6 miles (10 km) west of Builth Wells. The marriage was conducted by John Wesley, who had encouraged the union and guaranteed his brother an income of £100 per annum from book sales to reassure the Gwynne family of Charles financial position. This reassurance contrasted with the £600 a year that her mother had as her private income when she married Marmaduke Gwynne.

In September 1749 the Wesleys moved into 4 Charles Street in Bristol which remained their main residence until 1771. This house is now preserved as "Charles Wesley's House". Charles was described as a "preacher at the horsefair" by St. James Church which was his place of worship. The churchyard holds the remains of five of Wesley's children (John, Martha Maria, Susannah, Selena and John James) who died as infants during the 22 years they lived in Bristol.

The Wesley family were not known for their happy marriages but the marriage between Charles and Sarah seems to have been very happy. In 1753 Sarah suffered from smallpox. Although she survived the disease, the effects left her difficult to recognize. Wesley took her own line on her religion and continued to attend the Calvinist church of George Whitefield who she would have met as a child when he stayed at her father's house.

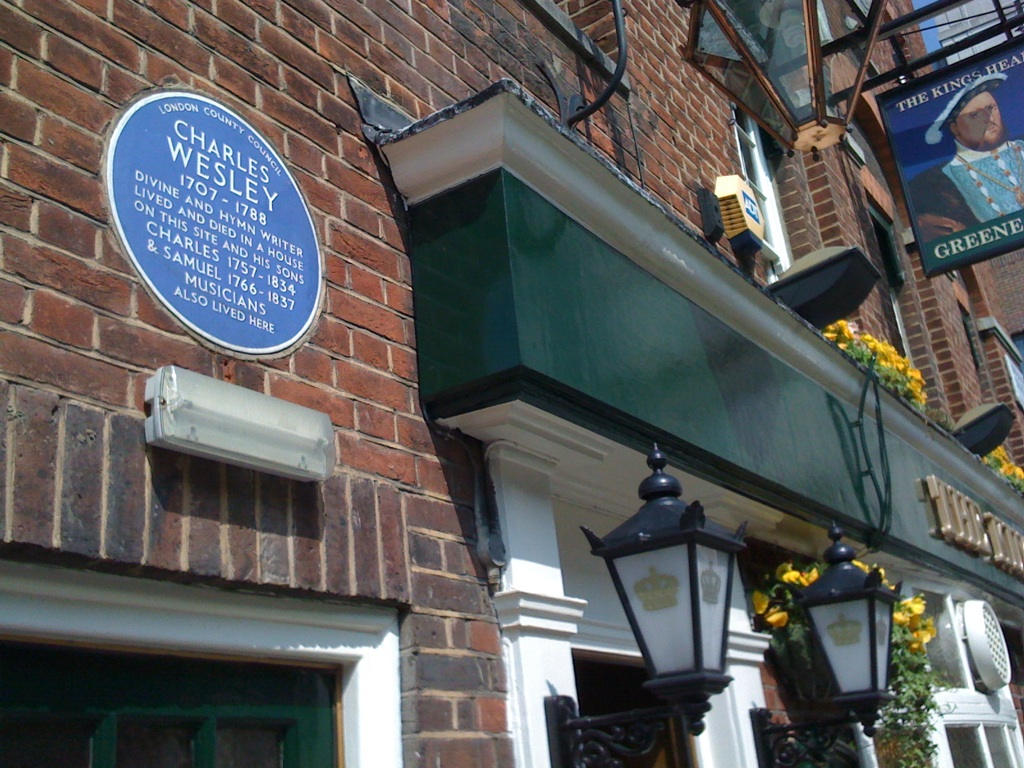
The place where Sarah Wesley and Charles Wesley lived and died is commemorated by a plaque on a pub in Marylebone in London.

Sarah and Charles Wesley had a number of children but only three survived to be adults. The surviving children were Charles Wesley junior, Samuel Wesley and Sarah Wesley. The two sons were musically gifted and made this their careers. Their mother was known for her musical abilities including her singing voice which she was still using to entertain in her old age. Sarah senior had performed musically for King George III.

After the death of her husband, Wesley was maintained by other Methodists and Evangelicals, including William Wilberforce. She died on 28 December 1822 and she was interred with her husband at St Marylebone Parish Church.

== Legacy ==
Wesley was painted in her lifetime and she has a 20th-century portrait by David Keal; who also painted other members of her family. The house that Charles and Sarah (a.k.a. Sally) had in Marylebone, London has now been demolished. Ironically the blue plaque that records the location of this couple's house, who were part of the temperant Methodist movement, is now attached to a public house.

Wesley family tree
The family tree of the Wesleys, founders of Methodism.

Bartholomew Westley b.1596	Anne Colley
? a (daughter of John White)	John; Westley b.1638	Samuel Annesley b.1620
Timothy Wesley (born 1659)	Matthew Wesley	Samuel; Wesley (b.1662)	Susanna; Wesley (b.1669)
Samuel (Sammy); Wesley (b.1690)	Emilia (Emily); Wesley (b.1692)	Mary (Molly); Wesley (b.1696)	Anne; Wesley (b.1702)	Martha; Wesley (b.1706)	Kezia; Wesley (b.1709)
Nine other children (deceased)	Susanna; Wesley (b.1695)	Mehetabel; Wesley (b.1697)	John; Wesley (b.1703)	Mary; Vazeille	Charles; Wesley (b.1707)	Sarah; Gwynne
Seven other children (deceased)	Charles Wesley (b.1757)	Sarah (Sally) Wesley (b.1759)
Charlotte; Louise; Martin	Samuel Wesley (b.1766)	Sarah; Suter
Three children	Samuel Sebastian Wesley (b.1810)

Explanatory notes and reference sources
