= Susanna Wesley =

Mother of John and Charles Wesley

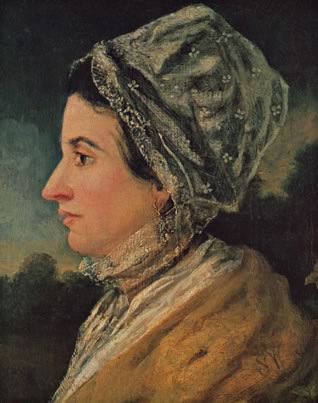
- Born: Susanna Annesley; 20 January 1669; London, England
- Died: 23 July 1742 (aged 73); London, England
- Spouse: Samuel Wesley (m. 1688; died 1735)
- Children: Samuel Wesley (the Younger), John Wesley, Charles Wesley; Emilia, Susanna, Mary, Benjamin, Mehetabel, Anne, Martha, Kezia
- Parent(s): Samuel Annesley; Mary White

Susanna Wesley (née Annesley; 20 January 1669 – 23 July 1742) was the daughter of Samuel Annesley and Mary White, and the mother of John and Charles.

“…although she never preached a sermon or published a book or founded a church, (she) is known as the Mother of Methodism. Why? Because two of her sons, John Wesley and Charles Wesley, as children consciously or unconsciously will, applied the example and teachings and circumstances of their home life.”

The Methodist Church in Britain adds that as a writer, theologian and teacher, she also "deserves recognition in her own right".

== Family ==
Susanna Wesley was the youngest of 25 children. Her father, Samuel Annesley, was a Dissenter from the established church in England. At the age of 12, Susanna stopped attending her father's church and joined the Church of England.

She and Samuel Wesley were married on 11 November 1688. Samuel was 26 and Susanna was 19.

Susanna and Samuel Wesley had 19 children. Nine of her children died as infants. Four of those who died were twins. A maid accidentally smothered one child. At her death, only eight of her children were still alive.

Wesley family tree
The family tree of the Wesleys, founders of Methodism.

Bartholomew Westley b.1596 | Anne Colley
? a (daughter of John White) | John; Westley b.1638 | Samuel Annesley b.1620
Timothy Wesley (born 1659) | Matthew Wesley | Samuel; Wesley (b.1662) | Susanna; Wesley (b.1669)
Samuel (Sammy); Wesley (b.1690) | Emilia (Emily); Wesley (b.1692) | Mary (Molly); Wesley (b.1696) | Anne; Wesley (b.1702) | Martha; Wesley (b.1706) | Kezia; Wesley (b.1709)
Nine other children (deceased) | Susanna; Wesley (b.1695) | Mehetabel; Wesley (b.1697) | John; Wesley (b.1703) | Mary; Vazeille | Charles; Wesley (b.1707) | Sarah; Gwynne
Seven other children (deceased) | Charles Wesley (b.1757) | Sarah (Sally) Wesley (b.1759)
Charlotte; Louise; Martin | Samuel Wesley (b.1766) | Sarah; Suter
Three children | Samuel Sebastian Wesley (b.1810)

Explanatory notes and reference sources

== Personal life ==
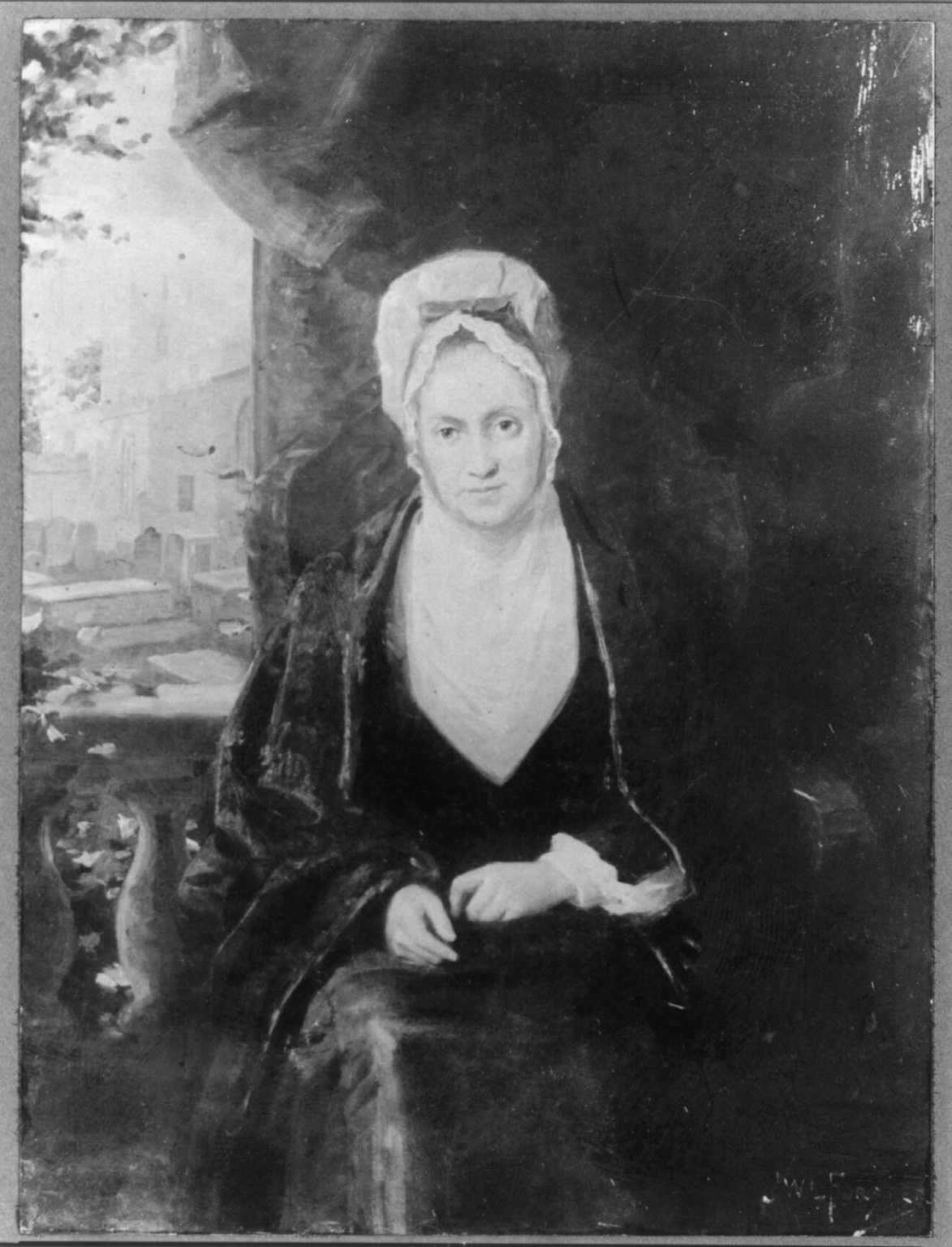
A print of Wesley

Susanna experienced many hardships throughout her life. Her husband left her and the children for over a year because of a minor dispute.

To her absent husband, Susanna Wesley wrote:

I am a woman, but I am also the mistress of a large family. And though the superior charge of the souls contained in it lies upon you, yet in your long absence I cannot but look upon every soul you leave under my charge as a talent committed to me under a trust. I am not a man nor a minister, yet as a mother and a mistress I felt I ought to do more than I had yet done. I resolved to begin with my own children; in which I observe the following method: I take such a proportion of time as I can spare every night to discourse with each child apart. On Monday I talk with Molly, on Tuesday with Hetty, Wednesday with Nancy, Thursday with Jacky, Friday with Patty, Saturday with Charles.

Samuel Wesley spent time in jail twice due to his poor financial abilities, and the lack of money was a continual struggle for Susanna. Their house was burned down twice. During one of the fires, her son, John, nearly died and had to be rescued from the second storey window. She was the primary source of her children's education.

After the second fire, Susanna was forced to place her children into different homes for nearly two years while Epworth Rectory was rebuilt. During this time, the Wesley children lived under the rules of the homes they lived in. Susanna was mortified that her children began to use improper speech and play more than study.

“Under no circumstances were the children permitted to have any lessons until they had reached their fifth year, but the day after their fifth birthday their formal education began. They attended classes for six hours and on the very first day they were supposed to learn the whole of the alphabet. All her children except two managed this feat, and these seemed to Susanna to be very backward.” “The children got a good education. Daughters included, they all learnt Latin and Greek and were well tutored in the classical studies that were traditional in England at that time.”

During a time when her husband was in London, defending a friend against charges of heresy, he appointed a locum to bring the message. The man’s sermons revolved solely around repaying debts. The lack of diverse spiritual teaching caused Susanna to assemble her children Sunday afternoon for family services. They would sing a psalm and then Susanna would read a sermon from either her husband's or father's sermon file followed by another psalm. The local people began to ask if they could attend. At one point there were over 200 people who would attend Susanna’s Sunday afternoon service, while the Sunday morning service dwindled to nearly nothing.

Wesley practised daily devotions throughout her life, and in her reply to her son Charles's letter, she addressed her experience of the depravity of her human nature, and the grace of God. The letter also shows that she has been fully awakened to the spiritual enjoyments for many years, with which her sons were only recently made acquainted.

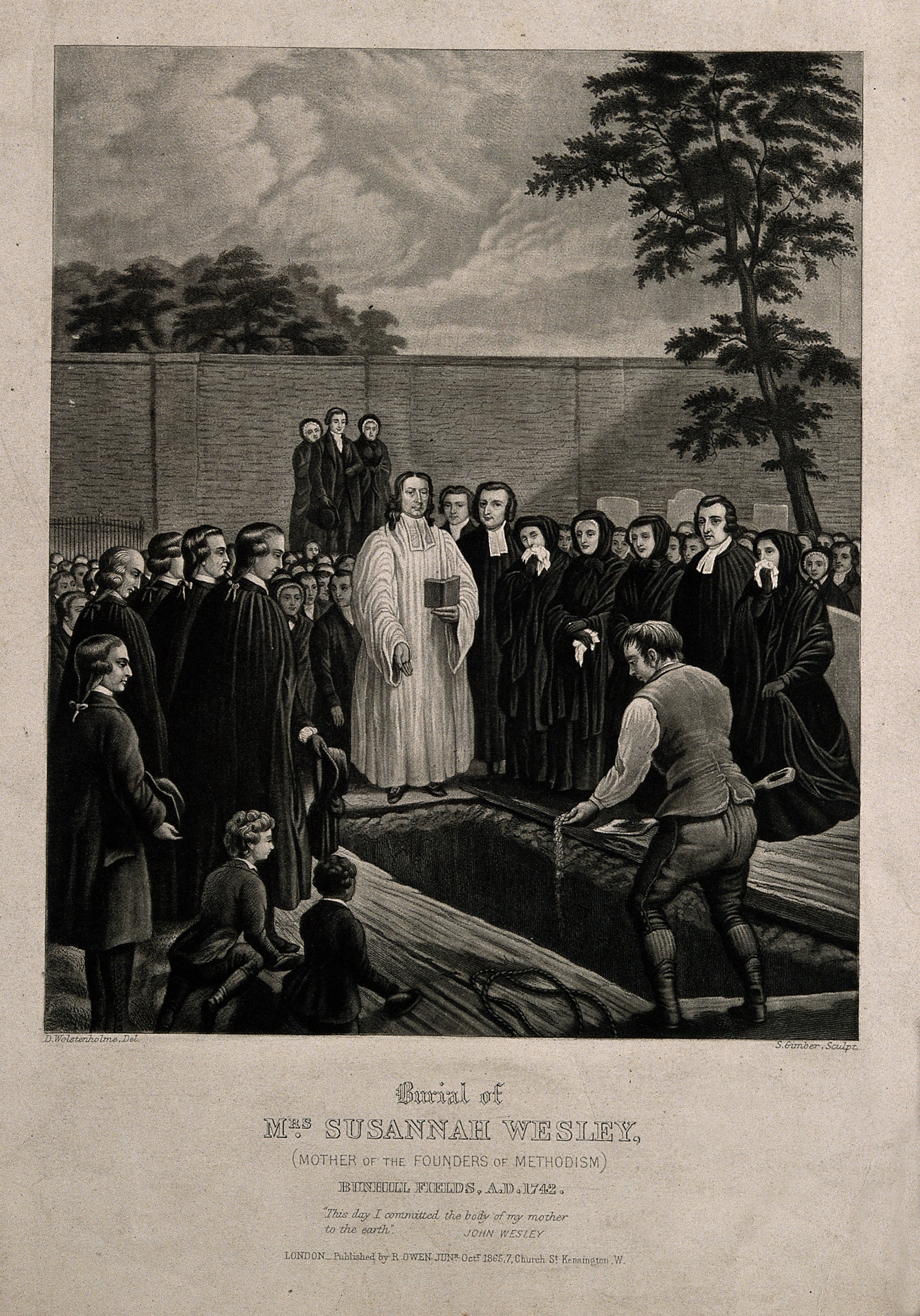
The funeral of Susanna Wesley, with John Wesley officiating

Her husband Samuel spent his whole life and all of the family’s finances on his exegetical work of the Book of Job. However, his work was not remembered and had little impact on his family other than as a hardship. In contrast Susanna wrote several pieces that would be fundamental in the education of their children. “In addition to letters, Susanna Wesley wrote meditations and scriptural commentaries for her own use. She wrote extended commentaries on the Apostles Creed, the Lord's Prayer, the Ten Commandments. Many of these were lost in the rectory fire, but many survive. The most accessible means to her writings is Charles Wallace's excellent and important Susanna Wesley, The Complete Writings.”

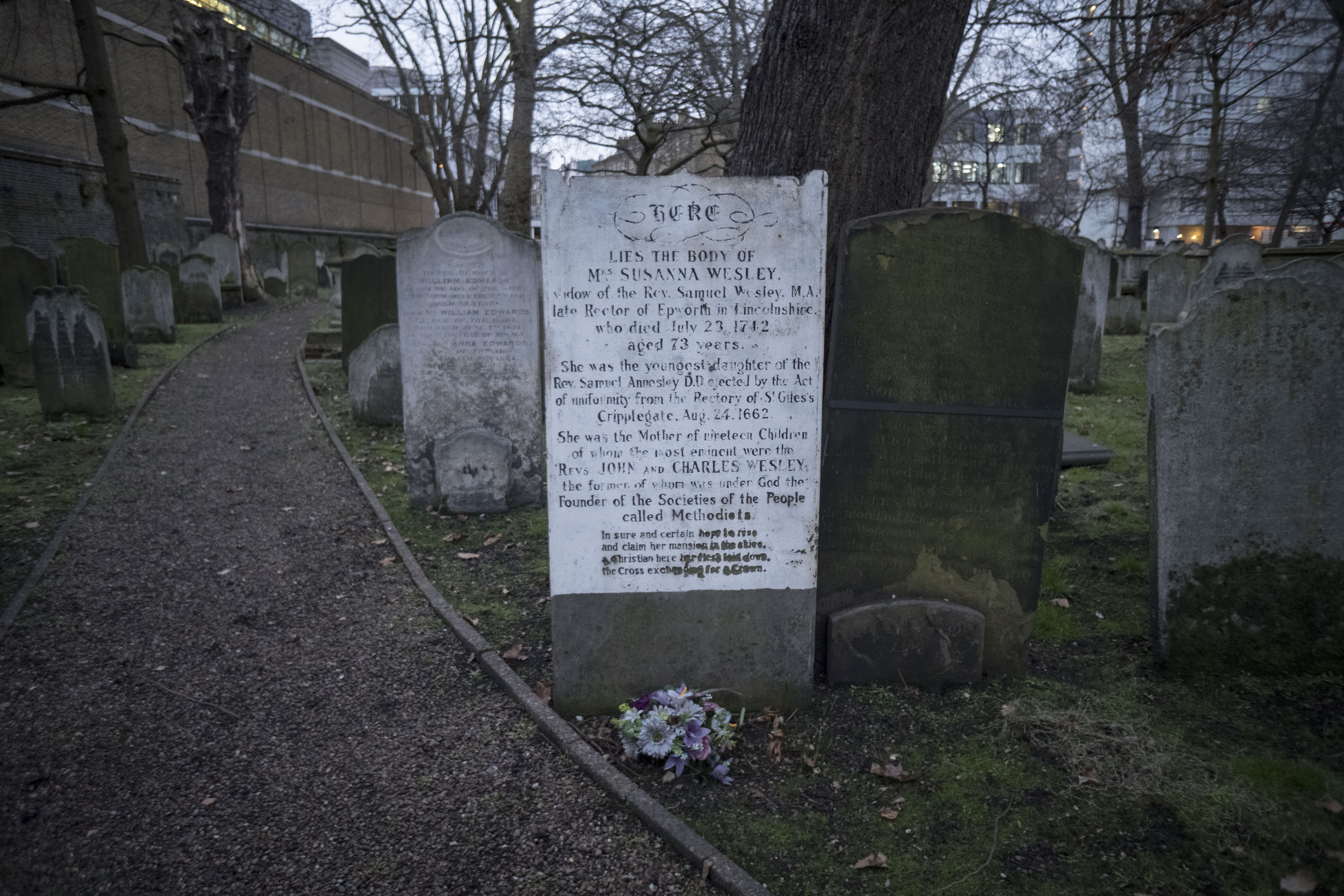
Wesley's gravestone in Bunhill Fields burial ground

Susanna was buried at Bunhill Fields in London.

== In film ==
In 1954, the Radio and Film Commission of the Methodist Church in Britain, in cooperation with J. Arthur Rank, produced the film John Wesley. The film was a live-action re-telling of the story of the life of John Wesley, with Leonard Sachs as John Wesley and Curigwen Lewis as Susanna Wesley.

In 2009, a more ambitious feature film, Wesley, was released by Foundery Pictures, starring Burgess Jenkins as John Wesley, June Lockhart as Susanna Wesley, and R. Keith Harris as Charles Wesley.
