= Charles Wesley junior =

English organist and composer

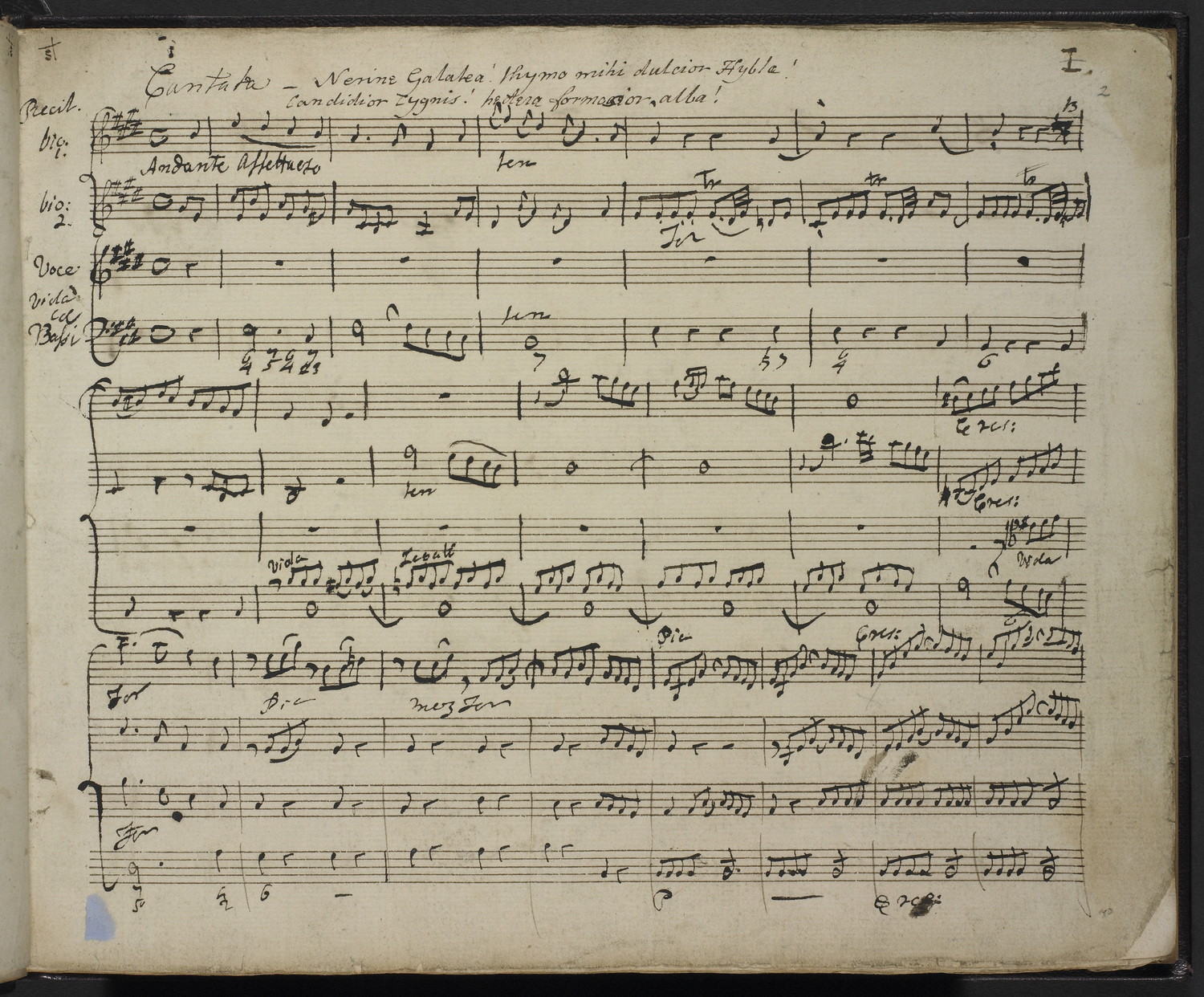
First page of Wesley's cantata The western sky was purpled o'er, in the composer's hand

Charles Wesley junior (11 December 1757 – 23 May 1834) was an English organist and composer. He was the son of Sarah and Charles Wesley (the great hymn-writer and one of the founders of Methodism), and the brother of Samuel Wesley, also an organist and composer. He is usually referred to as "Charles Wesley junior" to avoid confusion with his more famous father. He married Eliza Skelton and had at least two children.

Although Charles Wesley junior is much less well known than his brother Samuel Wesley, he was like Samuel regarded as a musical prodigy in childhood, and he was playing the organ before the age of three. He became a professional musician in adulthood, and Matthews (1971) quotes the European Magazine of 1784 as reporting that "his performance on the organ has given supreme delight". However he did not enjoy public performance, and worked mainly as a private organist, at one time to the Prince Regent; he was connected with the royal family through much of his life, having first played at the Queen's House at the age of 18. A handful of his compositions are still played, and a keyboard sonata in F minor was recently discovered and received its first performance on 1 February 2007 at the Perkins School of Theology at Southern Methodist University, as part of Methodist celebration of a year that is both the 300th anniversary of Charles Wesley's birth and the 250th anniversary of Charles Wesley junior's.

Wesley family tree
The family tree of the Wesleys, founders of Methodism.

Bartholomew Westley b.1596	Anne Colley
? a (daughter of John White)	John; Westley b.1638	Samuel Annesley b.1620
Timothy Wesley (born 1659)	Matthew Wesley	Samuel; Wesley (b.1662)	Susanna; Wesley (b.1669)
Samuel (Sammy); Wesley (b.1690)	Emilia (Emily); Wesley (b.1692)	Mary (Molly); Wesley (b.1696)	Anne; Wesley (b.1702)	Martha; Wesley (b.1706)	Kezia; Wesley (b.1709)
Nine other children (deceased)	Susanna; Wesley (b.1695)	Mehetabel; Wesley (b.1697)	John; Wesley (b.1703)	Mary; Vazeille	Charles; Wesley (b.1707)	Sarah; Gwynne
Seven other children (deceased)	Charles Wesley (b.1757)	Sarah (Sally) Wesley (b.1759)
Charlotte; Louise; Martin	Samuel Wesley (b.1766)	Sarah; Suter
Three children	Samuel Sebastian Wesley (b.1810)

Explanatory notes and reference sources
