= Samuel Wesley (poet, died 1739) =

English poet and cleric

The Reverend Samuel Wesley
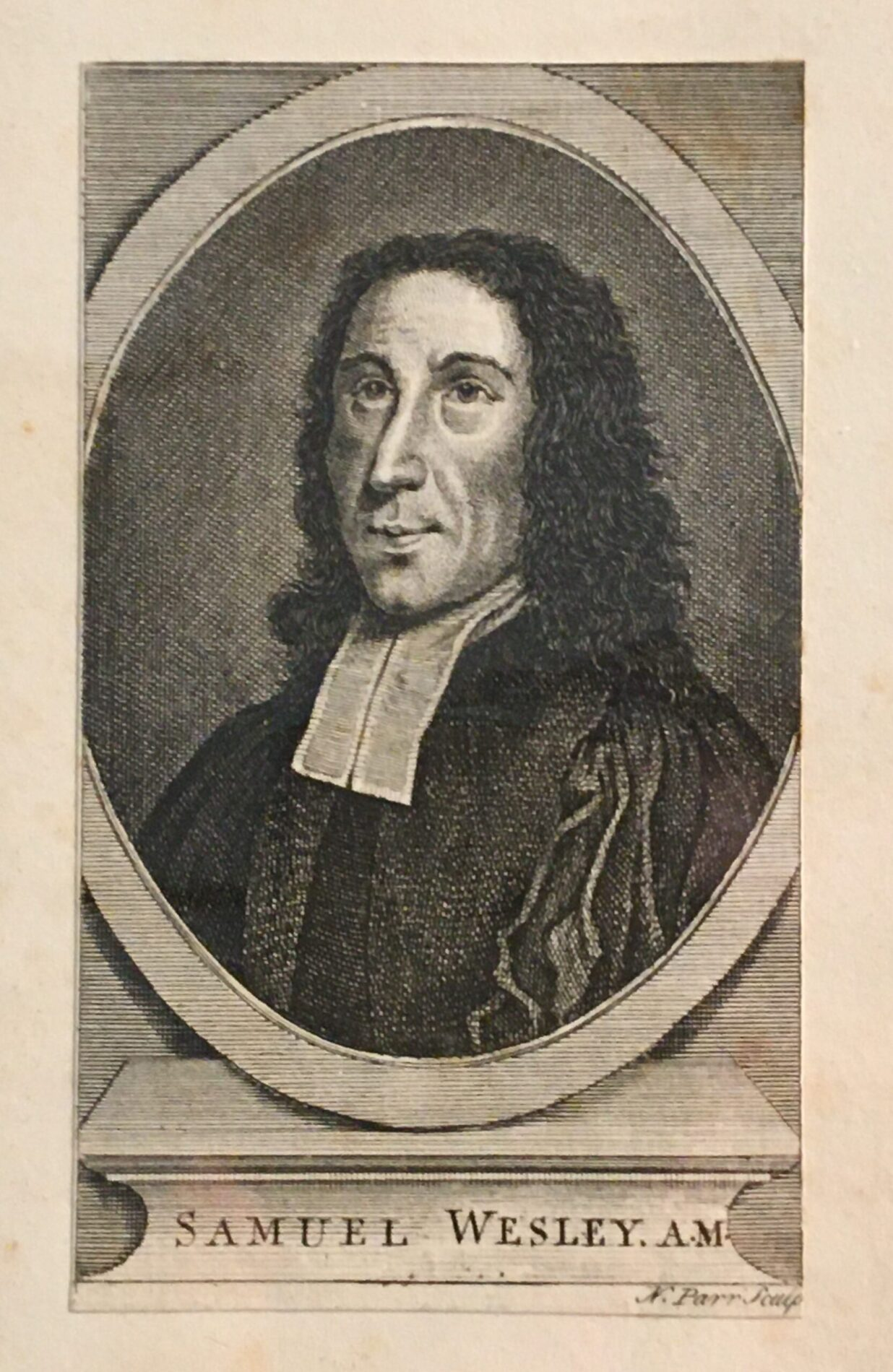
- Portrait of by Nathaniel Parr (Poems on Several Occasions, 1743)
- Born: 10 February 1691; Spitalfields, London, England
- Died: 6 November 1739 (aged 48); Tiverton, Devon, England
- Other names: Samuel Wesley the Younger; Samuel Wesley Junior
- Occupation: Anglican priest
- Known for: Christian poetry

Samuel Wesley (10 February 1690 or 1691 – 6 November 1739) was a poet, teacher and an Anglican cleric. He was the eldest of the Wesley brothers—with younger brothers John and Charles—but did not play a notable role in the nascent Methodist movement.

== Birth ==
Wesley was the eldest son of the cleric and poet Samuel Wesley and of Susanna Annesley Wesley. He was the brother of John Wesley and Charles Wesley. He was born in Spitalfields, London in either 1690 or 1691. He said he was 18 years old in 1711 and he wrote a letter in which he said he was born in 1690. His tombstone said he died in his 49th year, which would put his birth in 1691.

== Education and career ==
Wesley was educated at Westminster School before entering Christ Church, Oxford in 1711 where he received a B.A. degree in 1715 and a M.A. in 1718. He was ordained and became head usher at Westminster School for 20 years (from 1713 to 1733). After that he was master of Blundell's School, Tiverton, Devon, where he died after a short illness on 6 November 1739. He is buried in the Tiverton churchyard.

== Marriage ==
Wesley married Ursula Berry (died c1742), daughter of the Reverend John Berry, vicar of Walton, Norfolk. They had six children, four of whom died in infancy. They were survived by two children: a daughter and a son.

== Religion ==
A high church Tory, Wesley was a friend of Bishop Francis Atterbury. He was never a Methodist and yet five hymns of several composed by him are in the Wesleyan Hymn Book of the present day.

== Text records ==
- 1723 The Battle of the Sexes. A Poem.
- 1726 Pastoral.
- 1726 The Iliad in a Nutshell: or, Homer's Battle of the Frogs and Mice.
- 1736 The Descriptive: a Miltonick. After the Manner of the Moderns.
- 1736 ca. Wroote: a Heroic Poem. Humbly inscribed to Miss Mehetabel Wesley.

== Publications ==
- Neck or nothing, a consolatory letter from Mr Dunton to Mr Curll. 1716.
- The battle of the sexes: a poem. 1723.
- A new ballad. 1723.
- The story of the three children. 1724.
- The pig and the mastiff: two tales. 1725.
- The Iliad in a nutshell: or Homer's Battle of the frogs and mice. 1726.
- To the memory of the right reverend father in God, Francis Gastrell. 1726.
- The prisons open'd: a poem. 1729. Online at the British Library
- Verses on the death of Mrs Morice. 1730.
- The cobbler, a tale. 173?
- The parish priest: a poem upon a clergyman lately deceas'd. 1732.
- The Christian poet ... or poems by Mr. Wesley. 1735.
- Four tales after the manner of the ingenious Matt Prior. 1735?
- Poems on several occasions. 1736, 1743.
- Tales, instructive and entertaining. 1808.
- Poems on several occasions ... including many pieces never before published, ed. John Nichols

Wesley family tree
The family tree of the Wesleys, founders of Methodism.

Bartholomew Westley b.1596 | Anne Colley
? a (daughter of John White) | John; Westley b.1638 | Samuel Annesley b.1620
Timothy Wesley (born 1659) | Matthew Wesley | Samuel; Wesley (b.1662) | Susanna; Wesley (b.1669)
Samuel (Sammy); Wesley (b.1690) | Emilia (Emily); Wesley (b.1692) | Mary (Molly); Wesley (b.1696) | Anne; Wesley (b.1702) | Martha; Wesley (b.1706) | Kezia; Wesley (b.1709)
Nine other children (deceased) | Susanna; Wesley (b.1695) | Mehetabel; Wesley (b.1697) | John; Wesley (b.1703) | Mary; Vazeille | Charles; Wesley (b.1707) | Sarah; Gwynne
Seven other children (deceased) | Charles Wesley (b.1757) | Sarah (Sally) Wesley (b.1759)
Charlotte; Louise; Martin | Samuel Wesley (b.1766) | Sarah; Suter
Three children | Samuel Sebastian Wesley (b.1810)

Explanatory notes and reference sources

== Sources ==
- Virginia Tech, Center for Applied Technologies in the Humanities, Biography of Rev. Samuel Wesley the Younger, Extracted 9 July 2009
- National Library of Australia, Catalogue of works by Samuel Wesley, Extracted 9 July 2009
- Henry D. Rack, 'Wesley, Samuel the younger(1690/91–1739)', Oxford Dictionary of National Biography, Oxford University Press, 2004 accessed 15 Dec 2006
- Gilman, D. C.; Peck, H. T.; Colby, F. M., eds. (1905). "Wesley, Samuel (junior)" . New International Encyclopedia (1st ed.). New York: Dodd, Mead.
