= Mehetabel Wesley Wright =

English poet (1697–1750)

Mehetabel Wesley Wright (nicknames "Hetty" and "Kitty"; 1697 – 21 March 1750) was an English poet. She was a member of the influential religious Wesley family.

== Early life ==
Born in Epworth, Lincolnshire, Wright was the daughter of Samuel Wesley, an Anglican clergyman and poet and his wife Susanna Wesley (née Annesley). Wright was one of 19 children born to Samuel and Susanna Wesley, of whom at least nine died in infancy. Her siblings included younger brothers John Wesley and Charles Wesley, leaders of the Methodist movement, as well as an elder brother Samuel Wesley the Younger, who was a poet and a Church of England cleric. Emilia, Susanna, Mary, Anne, Martha, and Kezia were sisters. Nicknamed "Hetty", and called "Kitty" by her brother Samuel, Wright had a good education, and reportedly was able to read the Greek Testament at the age of eight. She was said to be witty and to have a good sense of humour.

== Career ==
As she grew Mehetabel had many admirers: but they were generally considered ill-suited by her family. When Wesley was about 27 years old, she was prevented from marrying a man whom her father called "an unprincipled lawyer." During 1725 she eloped twice, returning pregnant. Shortly after, she had an "offer of marriage" from a man named William Wright of Louth at Haxey, a journeyman plumber and glazier. Her father urged her to marry Wright, and she did so, on 13 October 1725, in what has been modernly described as a "shotgun marriage to a man who was her social and intellectual inferior".

Her uncle Matthew gave her a small marriage dowry. Mr. Wright set up business for himself. Mehetabel gave birth to a baby in February 1726 but the child only lived until December. She found her husband to be unsuited to her in all respects, indicating in a letter of 1729 that her marriage lacked "a mutual affection and desire of pleasing, something near an equality of mind and person, either earthly or heavenly wisdom, and anything to keep love warm between a young couple".

Wright's relationship with her father never recovered. Her younger brother, John, had mentioned his sister's poor treatment by their father in 1726 in his sermons and their father no longer recognised her as his daughter. Her brother Samuel bitterly chastised her in verse in "A Full Answer" in response to her poem "Wedlock: A Satire", declaring that "cursing wedlock is blaspheming".

By January 1728, Wright's husband had established his business of plumbing and glazing on Frith Street, Soho, London. The couple had several children, all of whom died young. It was Wright's opinion that the effluvia from her husband's lead works were the cause of the children's death. Many of her poems were written during this time, and reflect the sadness and frustration of her difficult married life. Poems such as "A Mother's Soliloquy Over Her Dying Infant" and "To an infant expiring the second day of its birth" (1733) indicate her deep grief over the deaths of her children.

For several years before her death, she was in a very infirm state of health, and could not write easily. Poems such as "A Farewell to the World" and "An Epitaph on Herself" prefigure her own death. In 1744, during a period of illness, her brother John arranged for her to visit Bristol, where she had the opportunity of witnessing the ministry of her brothers. Under his influence, she became "more and more convinced of [sin]" but did not participate directly in Methodist religious activities for fear of embarrassing her brother. She died in London on 21 March 1750.

== Legacy ==
Wright did not publish her poems personally, but they were circulated among her family and others during and after her lifetime. Several of her poems appeared in the sixth volume of The poetical calendar: Containing a collection of scarce and valuable pieces of poetry: with variety of originals and translations, by the most eminent hands. by Francis Fawkes, 1720–1777. Others were published in different collections, as well as in the Poetical Register, the Christian Magazine, and the Arminian Magazine. Wright's Address to her Dying Infant, composed during her confinement, is noted for its tenderness and highly polished phrasing, while tinged with the gloom which accompanied her marriage.

The regard that Wright was given can be judged by a letter written by the celebrity novelist Samuel Richardson in 1750 (or 1754). Here, he attempted to list women of his time who were "moral examples of their sex". This was not an exhaustive list and although Richardson included Wright, he did not include every gifted woman he knew. John Duncombe circulated some of her poems in the 1750s, and included her approvingly in The Feminead; or, Female Genius (1754).

Adam Clarke collected a number of her poems, as well as biographical information about her life, as part of his Memoirs of the Wesley family (1823). Her poetry was also collected with her family's in The Bards of Epworth (1856).

In 1903, the prolific novelist Sir Arthur Quiller-Couch published a historical novel titled "Hetty Wesley" which was based on the life of Wright. Roger Lonsdale includes a biography of Mehetabel Wesley Wright and a number of her poems in Eighteenth-Century Women Poets: An Oxford Anthology (1989).

Wesley family tree
The family tree of the Wesleys, founders of Methodism.

Bartholomew Westley b.1596	Anne Colley
? a (daughter of John White)	John; Westley b.1638	Samuel Annesley b.1620
Timothy Wesley (born 1659)	Matthew Wesley	Samuel; Wesley (b.1662)	Susanna; Wesley (b.1669)
Samuel (Sammy); Wesley (b.1690)	Emilia (Emily); Wesley (b.1692)	Mary (Molly); Wesley (b.1696)	Anne; Wesley (b.1702)	Martha; Wesley (b.1706)	Kezia; Wesley (b.1709)
Nine other children (deceased)	Susanna; Wesley (b.1695)	Mehetabel; Wesley (b.1697)	John; Wesley (b.1703)	Mary; Vazeille	Charles; Wesley (b.1707)	Sarah; Gwynne
Seven other children (deceased)	Charles Wesley (b.1757)	Sarah (Sally) Wesley (b.1759)
Charlotte; Louise; Martin	Samuel Wesley (b.1766)	Sarah; Suter
Three children	Samuel Sebastian Wesley (b.1810)

Explanatory notes and reference sources

== Bibliography ==
- Clarke, Adam (1823). Memoirs of the Wesley family (Public domain ed.).
- Richardson, Samuel (30 November 2014). Correspondence with Sarah Wescomb, Frances Grainger and Laetitia Pilkington. Cambridge University Press. ISBN 978-1-316-12324-9.
- Tyerman, Luke (1866). The life and times of the rev. Samuel Wesley, M.A., Rector of Epworth, and father of the Revs. John and Charles Wesley, the founders of the Methodists (Public domain ed.). Simpkin, Marshall & Company. p. 204.
