= Charles Wesley =

English Methodist and hymn writer (1707–1788)

The Reverend Charles Wesley
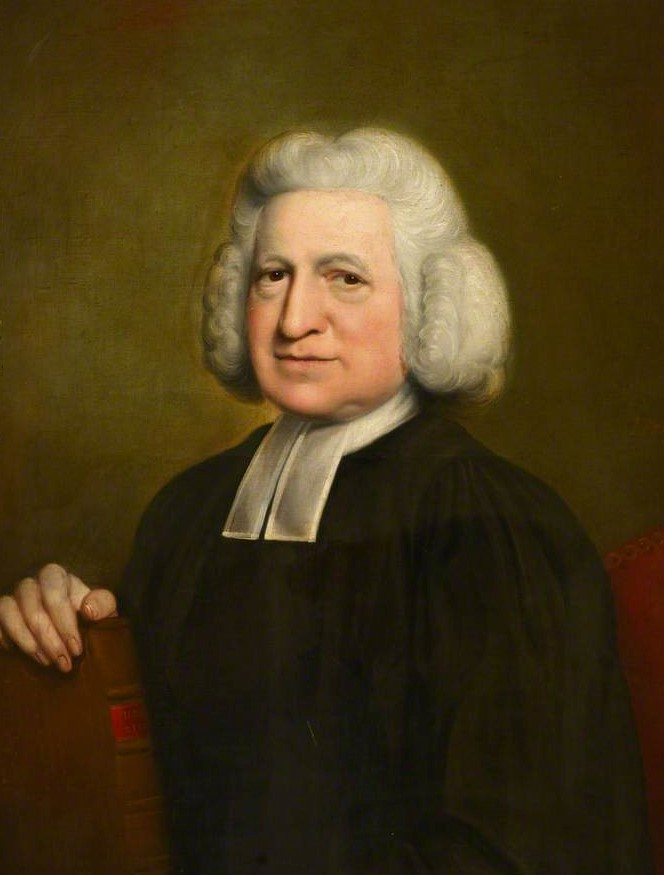
- Portrait by John Russell
- Born: 18 December 1707; Epworth, Lincolnshire, England
- Died: 29 March 1788 (aged 80); London, England
- Education: Westminster School and Christ Church, Oxford
- Occupations: Cleric, hymnist, poet
- Spouse: Sarah Wesley (née Gwynne)
- Children: 8, including Samuel Wesley
- Parent(s): Samuel and Susanna Wesley
- Relatives: Samuel Wesley (brother), Mehetabel Wesley Wright (sister), John Wesley (brother)

Ecclesiastical career
- Church: Church of England
- Congregations: New Room, Bristol

Charles Wesley (18 December 1707 – 29 March 1788) was an English Anglican cleric and a principal leader of the Methodist movement. Wesley was a prolific hymnwriter who wrote over 6,500 hymns during his lifetime. His works include "And Can It Be", "O for a Thousand Tongues to Sing", "Christ the Lord Is Risen Today", "Love Divine, All Loves Excelling", the carol "Hark! The Herald Angels Sing", and "Lo! He Comes With Clouds Descending".

Wesley was born in Epworth, Lincolnshire, the son of Anglican cleric and poet Samuel Wesley and his wife Susanna. He was a younger brother of Methodist founder John Wesley and Anglican cleric Samuel Wesley the Younger. He was the father of musician Samuel Wesley and the grandfather of musician Samuel Sebastian Wesley.

He was educated at Oxford University, where his brothers had also studied, and he formed the "Holy Club" among his fellow students in 1729. John Wesley later joined this group, as did George Whitefield. Charles followed his father and brother into ministry in 1735, and he travelled with John to Georgia in America, returning a year later. Following their evangelical conversions in 1738, the Wesley brothers travelled throughout Britain, converting followers to the Methodist revival through preaching and hymn singing. In 1749, he married Sarah Gwynne, the daughter of a Welsh gentleman who had been converted to Methodism by Howell Harris. From 1756 his ministry became more static and he ministered in Bristol, and later London.

Despite their closeness, Charles and John did not always agree on questions relating to their beliefs. In particular, Charles was strongly opposed to the idea of a breach with the Church of England in which they had been ordained.

== Biography ==
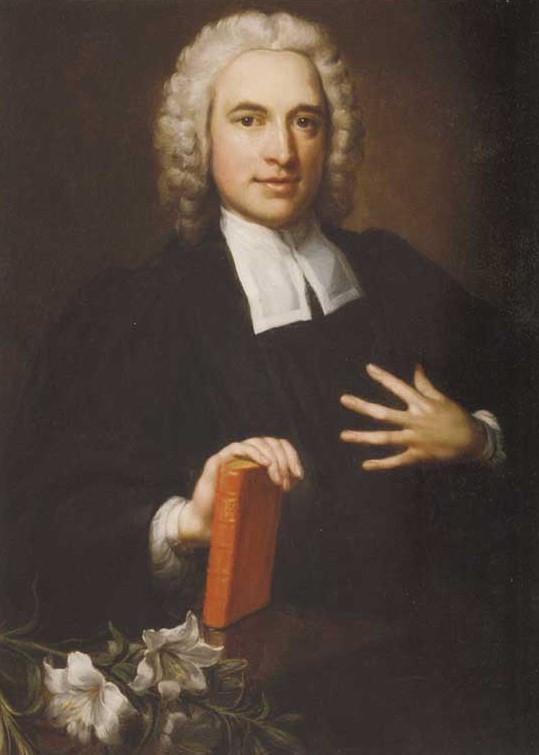
The 'Lily Portrait' of a young Wesley in the New Room, Bristol

=== Early life ===
Charles Wesley was the 18th child of Susanna Wesley and Samuel Wesley. He was born in Epworth, Lincolnshire, England, where his father was rector. In 1716, at the age of eight, he entered Westminster School, where his brother Samuel was usher. He was selected as King's Scholar in 1721 and head boy in 1725–26, before matriculating at Christ Church, Oxford.

At Oxford, Wesley formed a prayer group among his fellow students in 1727; his elder brother, John, joined in 1729, soon becoming its leader and moulding it in line with his own convictions. They focused on studying the Bible and living a holy life. Other students mocked them, saying they were the "Holy Club", "Sacramentarians", and "the Methodists", being methodical and exceptionally detailed in their Bible study, opinions and disciplined lifestyle. The Wesleys' future colleague, George Whitefield, joined the group later. Wesley tutored while studying; he graduated in 1732 with a master's degree in classical languages and literature. He followed his father and brothers into Anglican orders, being ordained as a priest in September 1735. That same year his father died.

=== Voyage to America ===
On 14 October 1735, Wesley and his brother John sailed on The Simmonds from Gravesend, Kent, for Savannah in the Georgia colony of British America at the request of the governor, James Oglethorpe. Wesley was appointed Secretary of Indian Affairs and while John remained in Savannah, Wesley went as chaplain to the garrison and colony at nearby Fort Frederica, St. Simon's Island, arriving there on 9 March 1736 according to his journal entry. Matters did not turn out well, and he was largely rejected by the settlers. In July 1736, Wesley was commissioned to England as the bearer of dispatches to the trustees of the colony. On 16 August 1736, he sailed from Charleston, South Carolina, never to return to the Georgia colony although he contemplated a return if he recovered from health issues.

=== Ministry ===
In 1738 the Wesley brothers, both dejected following their unsuccessful mission, had religious experiences: Charles experienced an evangelical conversion (or "renewal of faith") on 21 May and John had a similar experience in Aldersgate Street just three days later. A City of London blue plaque at 13 Little Britain, near the church of St Botolph, Aldersgate, off St. Martin's Le Grand, marks the site of the former house of John Bray, reputed to be the scene of Wesley's evangelical conversion. It reads, "Adjoining this site stood the house of John Bray. Scene of Charles Wesley's evangelical conversion, May 21st 1738". Wesley commemorated the first anniversary of his religious experience by composing an 18-stanza poem, with its seventh verse, beginning "O for a thousand tongues to sing", now serving as the opening of a shorter hymn.

Wesley felt renewed strength to spread the gospel to ordinary people and it was around then that he began to write the poetic hymns for which he would become known. In January 1739, he was appointed as curate to serve at St Mary's Church, Islington, but was forced to resign when the churchwardens objected to his evangelical preaching. Later that same year, finding that they were unwelcome inside parish churches, the Wesley brothers took to preaching to crowds in open fields. They were influenced by George Whitefield, whose open-air preaching was already reaching great numbers of Bristol colliers. Charles Wesley wrote to Whitefield regularly and is mentioned in many of Whitefield's journal entries. Whitefield drew from many of Wesley's hymns and even had one written to him by Wesley. From 1740, Charles and John were the joint leaders of the Methodist Revival and evangelised throughout Britain and Ireland. They were opposed by many Anglican clergy, especially when their appointed lay preachers began to preach in parishes without seeking permission. In Newcastle upon Tyne, Wesley established its first Methodist society. He faced mob violence in Wednesbury and Sheffield in 1743 and at Devizes in 1747.

Following a period of illness, after 1756 Wesley made no more journeys to distant parts of the country, mainly just moving between Bristol and London. Increasingly in his later years, Wesley became the mouthpiece of the so-called "Church Methodists"—he was strongly opposed to a separation of Methodism from its Anglican roots. In the 1780s, he was especially dismayed by his brother's ordination of Methodist ministers to serve in America (see John Wesley § Ordination of ministers), which he criticised in a published poem.

=== Marriage and children ===
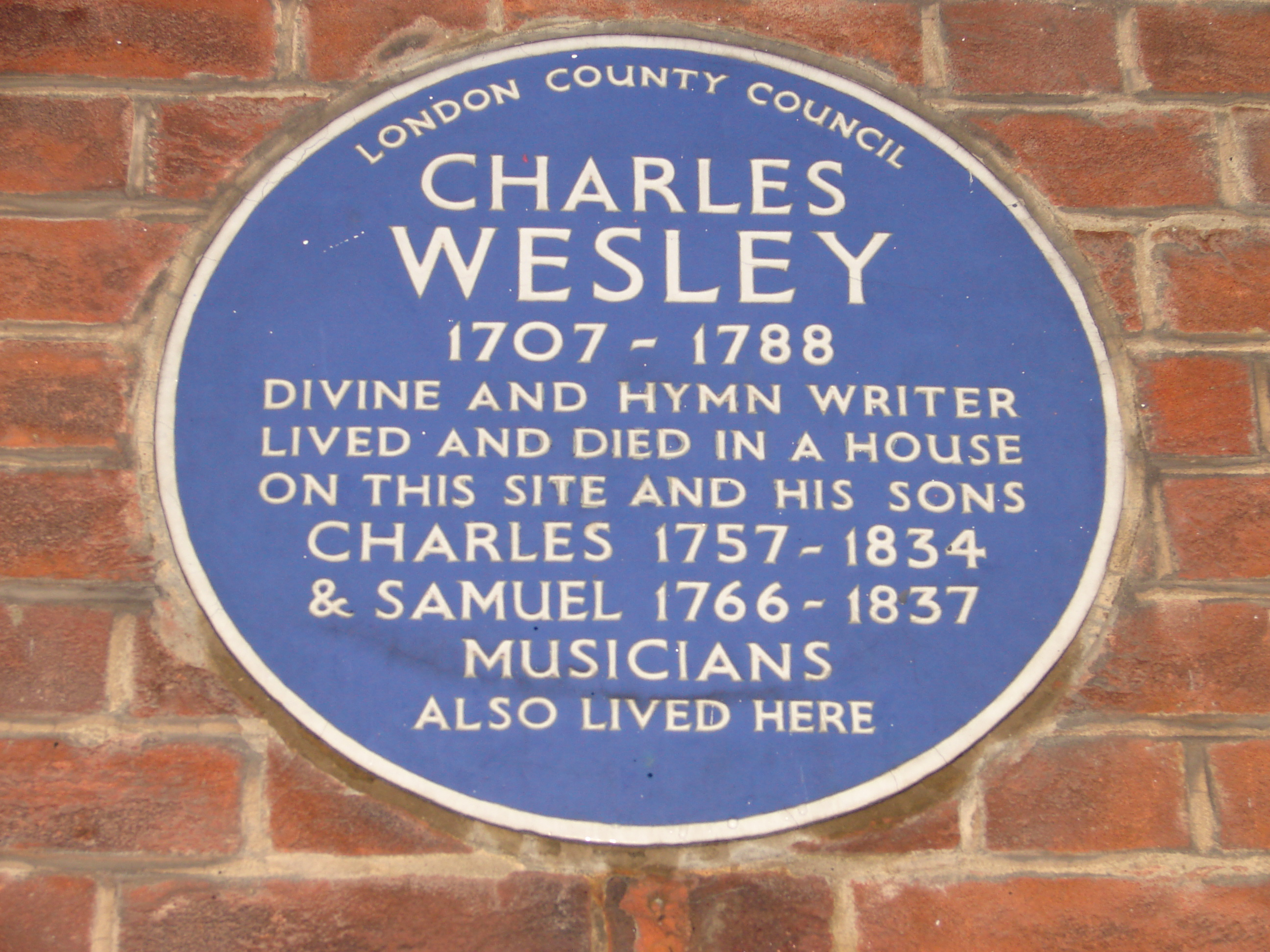
Plaque in Marylebone commemorating the site of Wesley's house (now a pub)

In April 1749, he married the much younger Sarah Gwynne (1726–1822), also known as Sally. She was the daughter of Marmaduke Gwynne, a wealthy Welsh magistrate who had been converted to Methodism by Howell Harris. They moved into a house at 4 Charles Street in Bristol in September 1749. Sarah accompanied the brothers on their journeys throughout Britain until at least 1753.

In 1771, Wesley obtained another house in London and moved into it that year with his elder son. By 1778 the whole family had transferred from Bristol to the London house, at 1 Great Chesterfield Street (now Wheatley Street), Marylebone, where they remained until Wesley's death and on into the 19th century. The house in Bristol still stands and has been restored, however the London house was demolished in the mid 19th century.

Only three of the couple's children survived infancy: Charles Wesley junior (1757–1834), Sarah Wesley (1759–1828), who like her mother was also known as Sally, and Samuel Wesley (1766–1837). Their other children, John, Martha Maria, Susannah, Selina and John James are all buried in Bristol, having died between 1753 and 1768. (See monument in garden on north side of junction of Lewis Mead and The Haymarket, Bristol.) Both Samuel and Charles junior were musical child prodigies and, like their father, became organists and composers. Charles junior spent most of his career as the personal organist of the Royal Family, and Samuel became one of the most accomplished musicians in the world and is often called "the English Mozart". Samuel Wesley's son, Samuel Sebastian Wesley, was one of the foremost British composers of the 19th century.

=== Death and burial ===
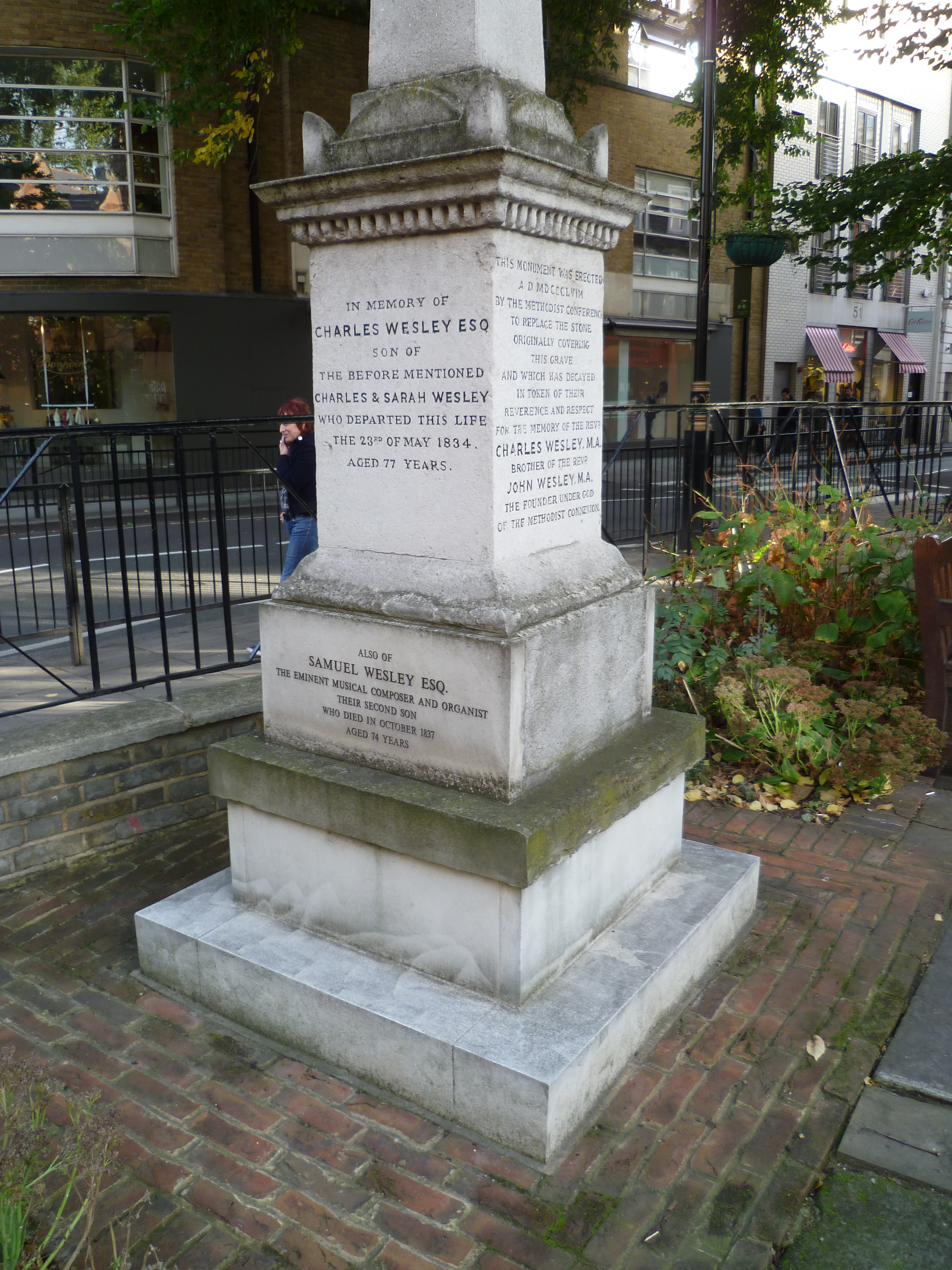
Monument in St Marylebone Old Churchyard at the position of Wesley's original grave

On his deathbed, he sent for the rector of St Marylebone Parish Church, John Harley, and purportedly told him "Sir, whatever the world may say of me, I have lived, and I die, a member of the Church of England. I pray you to bury me in your churchyard." At the age of 80, he died on 29 March 1788 in London. His body was carried to the church by six clergy of the Church of England. A memorial stone to him stands in the gardens in Marylebone High Street, close to his place of burial. One of his sons, Samuel, became the organist at the church.

== Hymns and other works ==
Wesley was a prolific hymnwriter. Among the collections (hymnals) of Wesley's hymns published in his lifetime were Hymns on God's Everlasting Love (1741, 1742), Hymns on the Lord's Supper (1745), and Short Hymns on Select Passages of the Holy Scriptures (1762), together with others celebrating the major festivals of the Christian year. His hymns are marked by their strong doctrinal content (notably the Arminian insistence on the universality of God's love), a richness of scriptural and literary allusion, and the variety of his metrical and stanza forms. They are considered to have had a significant influence not only on Methodism but on Christian worship and modern theology as a whole.

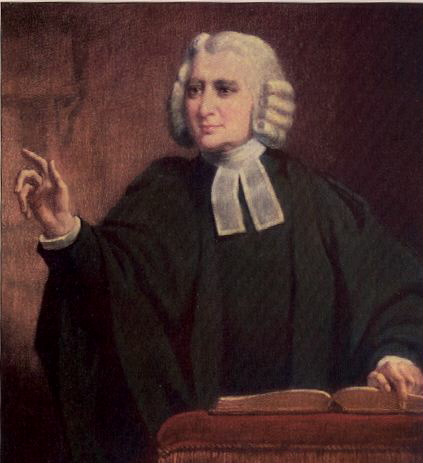
Wesley preaching by William Gush

Wesley's poetry included epistles, elegies and political and satirical verse. A collected edition of The Poetical Works of John and Charles Wesley, edited by George Osborn, was published in thirteen volumes in 1868–1872. Osborn's collection has now been supplemented by the three volumes of The Unpublished Poetry of Charles Wesley.

Jason E. Vickers states that Wesley's 'conversion experience' in 1738 had a clear impact on his doctrine, especially doctrine concerning the power of the Holy Spirit. The change was most prominent in his hymns written after the same year. From his published work Hymns and Prayers to the Trinity and in Hymn number 62 he writes "The Holy Ghost in part we know, For with us He resides, Our whole of good to Him we owe, Whom by His grace he guides, He doth our virtuous thoughts inspire, The evil he averts, And every seed of good desire, He planted in our hearts." Charles communicates several doctrines: the personal indwelling of the Holy Spirit, the sanctifying work of the Spirit, the depravity of mankind, and humanity's personal accountability to God.

=== Hymnody ===
In the course of his career, Wesley published the words of between 6,500 and 10,000 hymns, many of which are still popular. These include:

- "Arise, My Soul, Arise" (Words)
- "And Can It Be That I Should Gain?" (Words)
- "Christ the Lord Is Risen Today" (Words)
- "Christ, Whose Glory Fills the Skies" (Words)
- "Come, O Thou Traveller Unknown" (Words)
- "Come, Thou Long Expected Jesus" (Words)
- "Depth of Mercy, Can it Be" (Words)
- "Father, I Stretch My Hands to Thee" (Words)
- "Hail the Day That Sees Him Rise" (Words)
- "Hark! The Herald Angels Sing" (Words)
- "Jesus, Lover of My Soul" (Words)
- "Jesus, The Name High Over All" (Words)
- "Lo! He Comes with Clouds Descending" (Words)
- "Love Divine, All Loves Excelling" (Words)
- "O for a Heart to Praise My God" (Words)
- "O for a Thousand Tongues to Sing" (Words)
- "O Thou Who Camest from Above" (Words)
- "Rejoice, the Lord is King" (Words)
- "Soldiers of Christ, Arise" (Words)
- "Sun of Unclouded Righteousness" (Words)
- "Thou Hidden Source of Calm Repose" (Words)
- "Ye Servants of God" (Words)

The words to many more of Charles Wesley's hymns can be found on Wikisource, and in his many publications.

Some 150 of his hymns are in the Methodist hymn book Hymns and Psalms, including "Hark! the Herald Angels Sing", and The Church Hymn Book (In New York and Chicago, US, 1872) where "Jesus, Lover of My Soul" is published. Many of his hymns are translated into other languages, and form the foundation for Methodist hymnals, as well as the Swedish Metodist-Episkopal-Kyrkans Psalmbok printed in Stockholm in 1892.

=== Psalms ===
Wesley's hymns are notable as interpretations of Scripture. He also produced paraphrases of the Psalms, contributing to the long tradition of English metrical Psalmody. A notable feature of his Psalms is the introduction of Jesus into the Psalms, continuing a tradition of Christological readings of the Psalms evident in the translations of John Patrick and Isaac Watts. The introduction of Jesus into the Psalms was often the source of controversy, even within Wesley's own family. Charles' brother Samuel Wesley wrote a poem against such practice. Of particular importance is Wesley's manuscript Psalms, held in the archives of the Pitts Theology Library at Emory University.

== Legacy ==
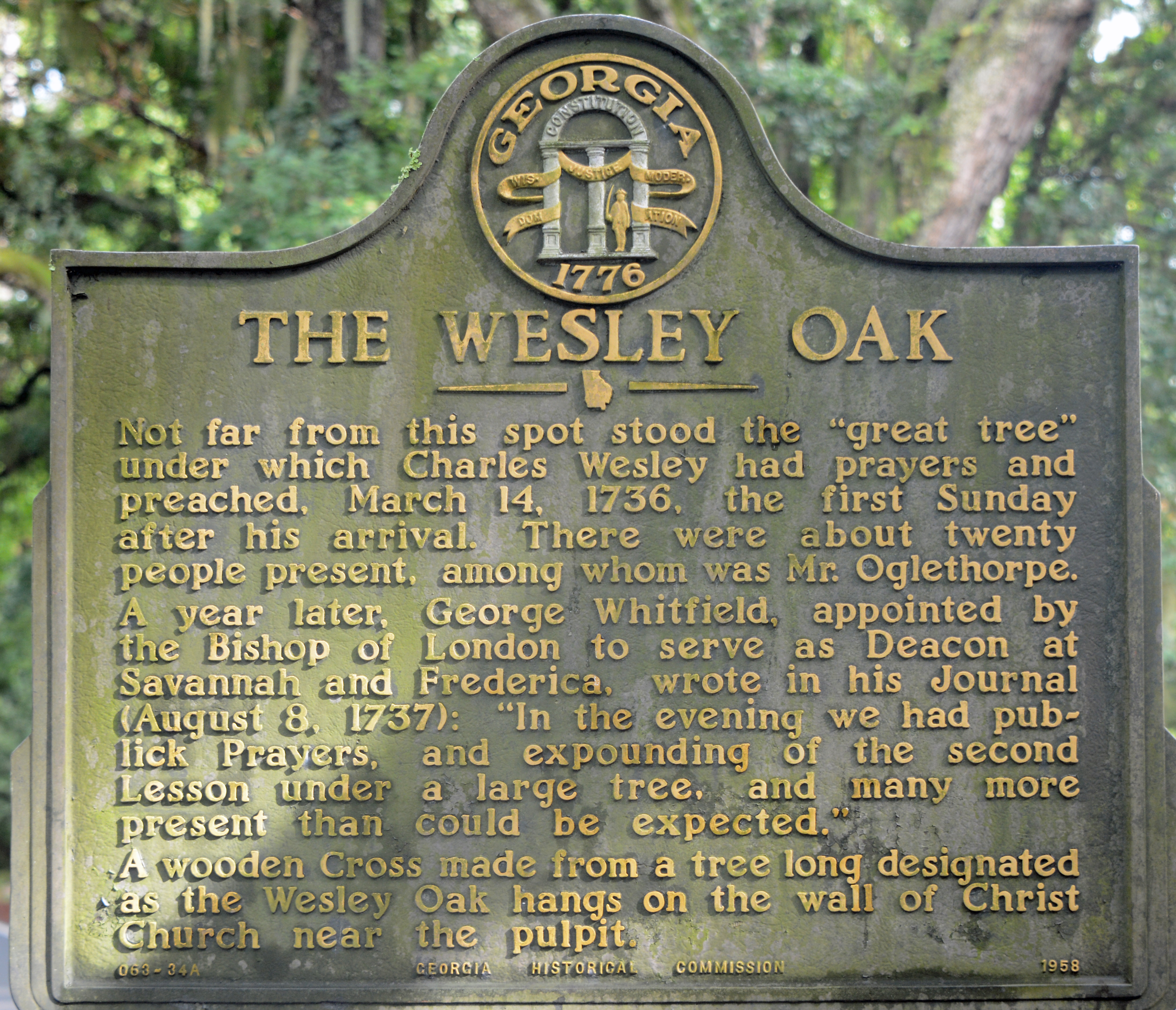
Wesley Oak historical marker, near Christ Church, St. Simons, Georgia

Wesley is still remembered for his ministry while in St. Simon's Island, Georgia, by the South Georgia Conference of the United Methodist Church; in 1950, the conference opened a Christian retreat centre on the island by the banks of the Frederica River, designating it Epworth by the Sea in honour of his and John's birthplace.

In the 19th century, Charles Wesley's legacy was downplayed by Methodist historians, largely because of his opposition to separating from the Church of England. He is remembered (with his brother) in the Church of England with a Lesser Festival on 24 May.

He is commemorated in the Calendar of Saints of the Evangelical Lutheran Church in America on 2 March with his brother. The brothers are also commemorated on 3 March in the Calendar of Saints of the Episcopal Church. Charles is commemorated on 29 March in the Calendar of Commemorations by the Methodist Order of Saint Luke; John is commemorated on 2 March; their parents are also commemorated.

As a result of his enduring hymnody, the Gospel Music Association recognised Wesley's musical contributions to the art of gospel music in 1995 by listing his name in the Gospel Music Hall of Fame.

Wesley's hymns are utilised in not only Methodist churches but other Protestant denominations, and have been adopted by the Roman Catholic Church. Wesley wrote two of the so-called Great Four Anglican Hymns: "Hark! The Herald Angels Sing" and "Lo! He Comes With Clouds Descending".

Memorials

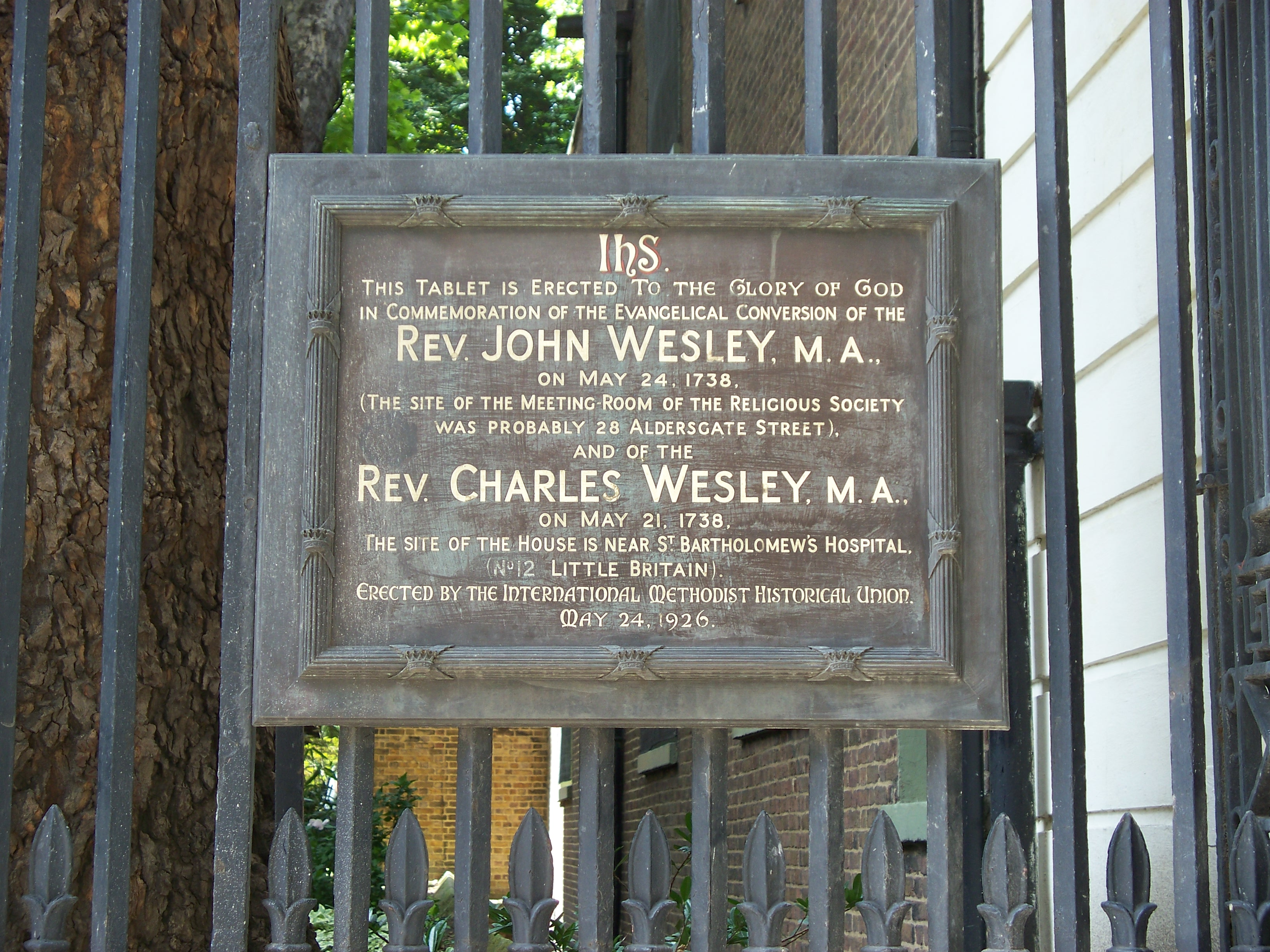
Plaque at Postman's Park, London, commemorating John and Charles Wesley

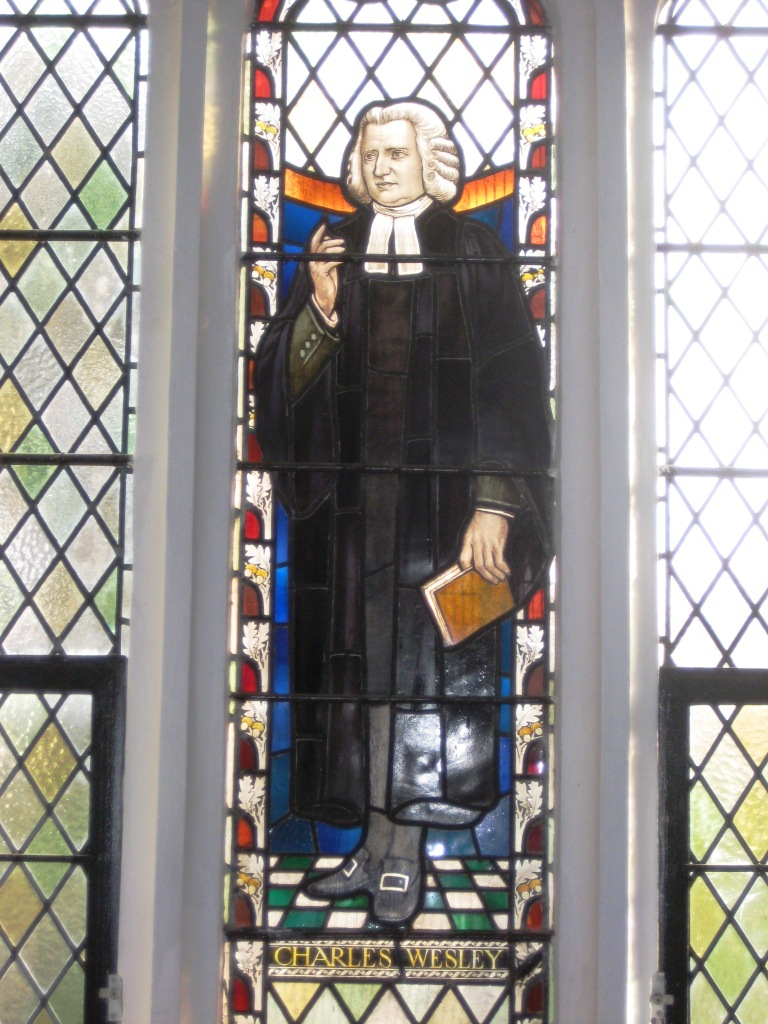
Wesley at St. Matthew's Church in Bristol, by Arnold Wathen Robinson

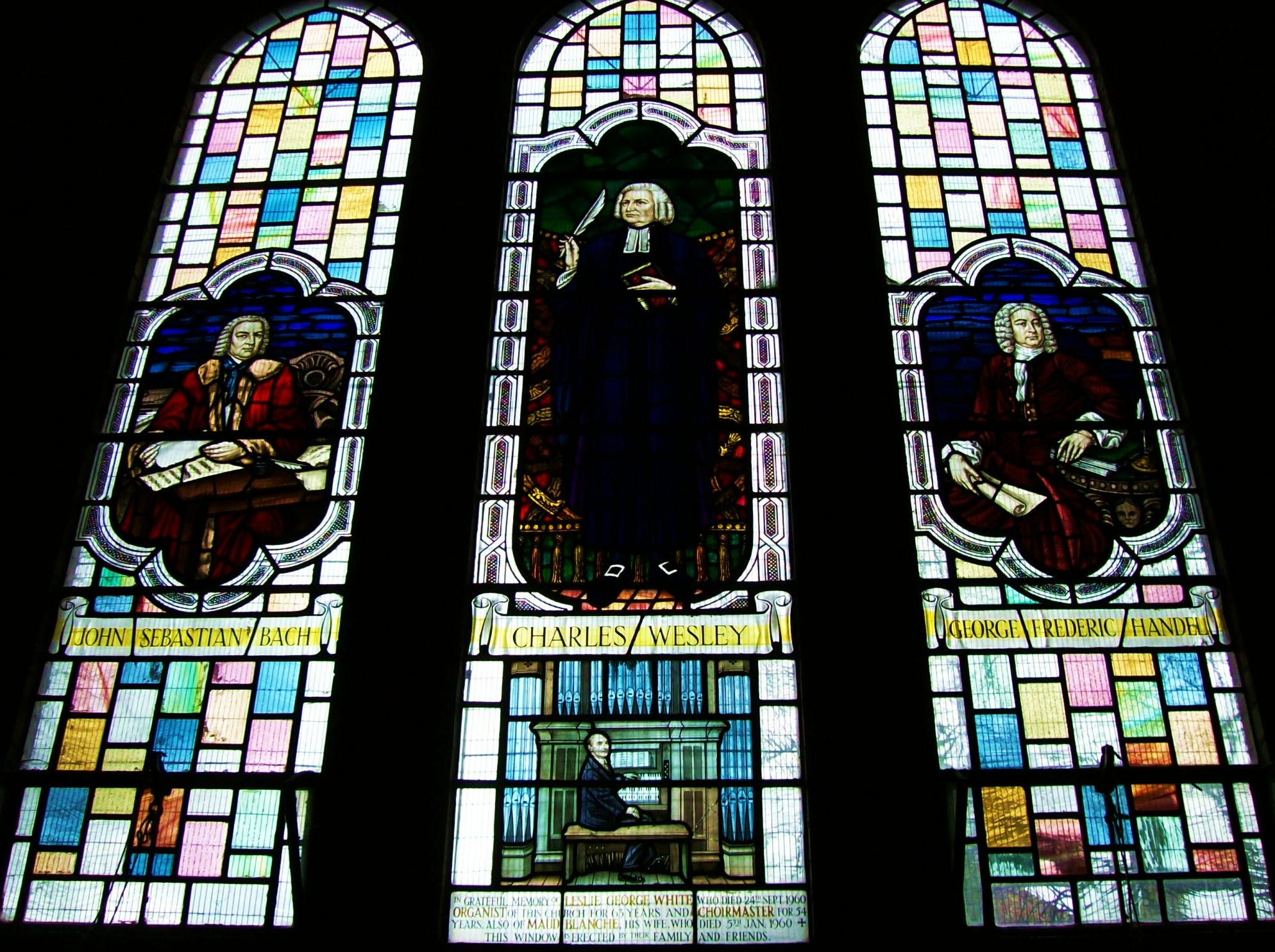
Bach, Wesley and Handel, at Cambridge Road Methodist Church, Birmingham

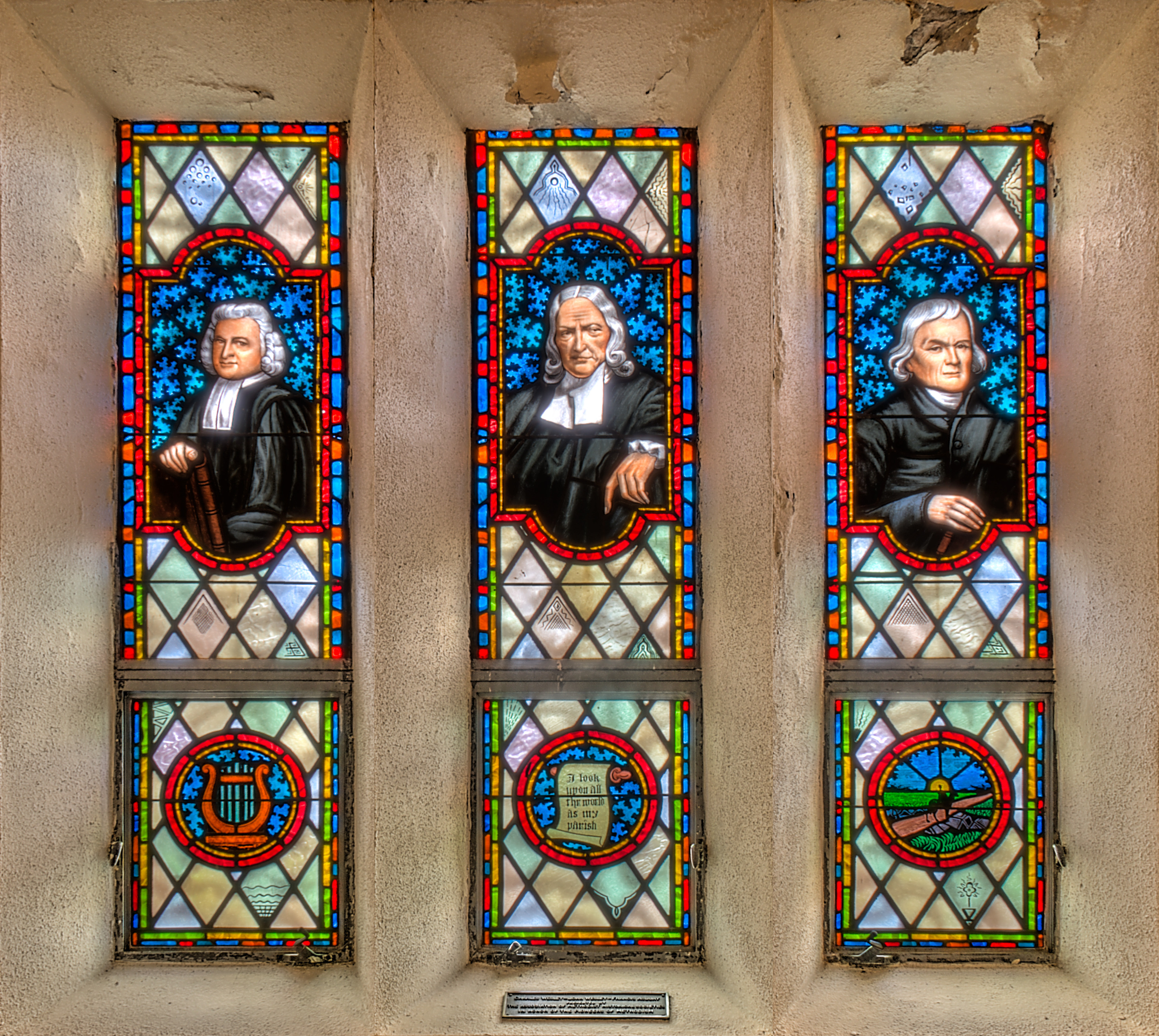
Stained glass of Charles Wesley, John Wesley, and Francis Asbury at Lake Junaluska

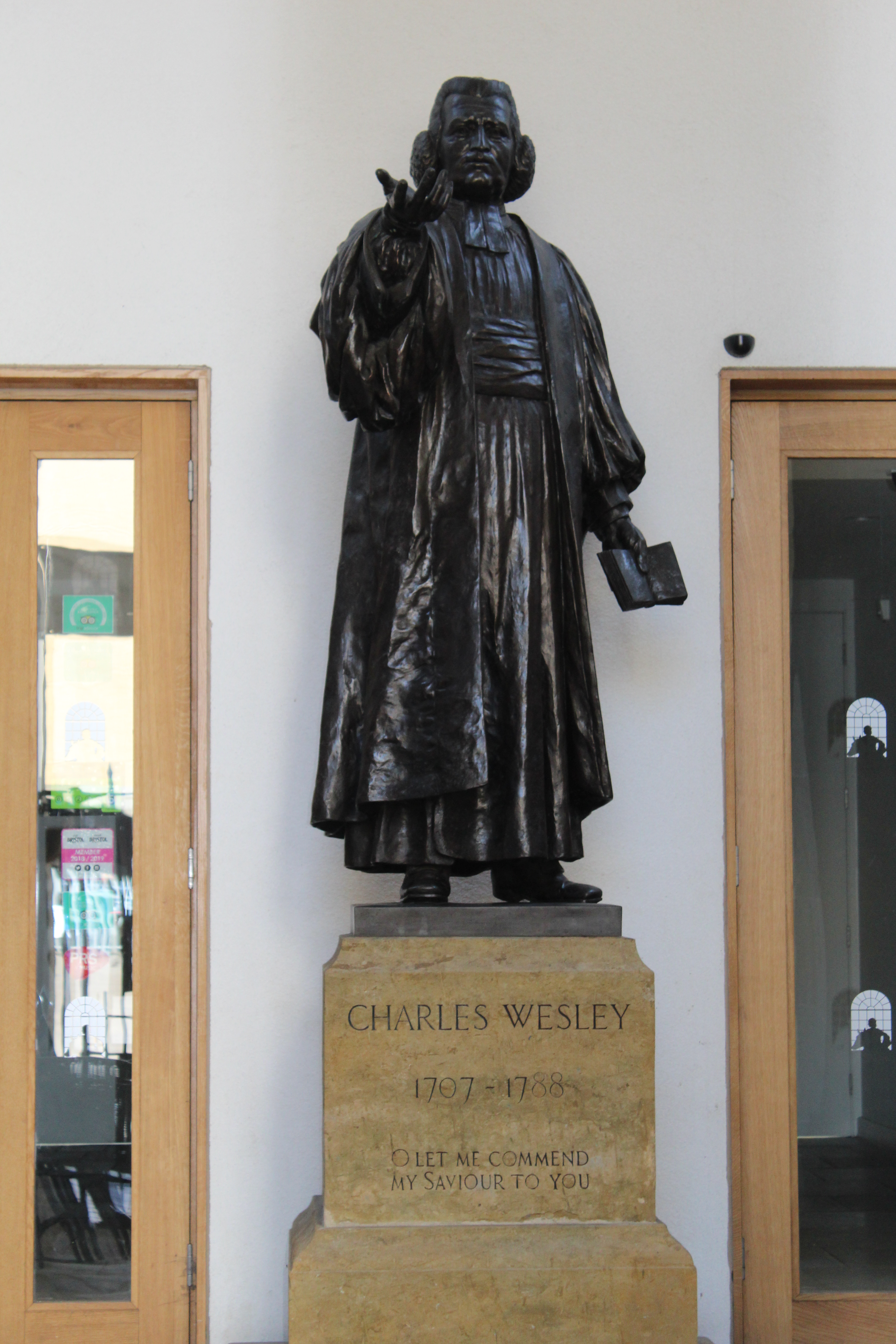
Statue by Frederick Brook Hitch at the New Room, Bristol

=== Tercentenary ===
24 May 2007 was celebrated as the tercentenary of Wesley's birth, with many celebratory events held throughout England, even though Wesley was in fact born in December 1707. The date of 24 May is known to Methodists as Aldersgate Day and commemorates the spiritual awakening of first Charles and then John Wesley in 1738.

In November 2007, An Post, the Irish Post Office, issued a 78-cent stamp to commemorate the 300th anniversary of Wesley's birth.

== In film ==
- A Heart Set Free – T. N. Mohan, 2007, a feature-length documentary on Charles Wesley's life and hymns.
- Wesley – Foundery Pictures, 2009, starring Burgess Jenkins as John Wesley, R. Keith Harris as Charles Wesley, and featuring June Lockhart as Susanna Wesley and Kevin McCarthy as Bishop Ryder

Wesley family tree
The family tree of the Wesleys, founders of Methodism.

Bartholomew Westley b.1596	Anne Colley
? a (daughter of John White)	John; Westley b.1638	Samuel Annesley b.1620
Timothy Wesley (born 1659)	Matthew Wesley	Samuel; Wesley (b.1662)	Susanna; Wesley (b.1669)
Samuel (Sammy); Wesley (b.1690)	Emilia (Emily); Wesley (b.1692)	Mary (Molly); Wesley (b.1696)	Anne; Wesley (b.1702)	Martha; Wesley (b.1706)	Kezia; Wesley (b.1709)
Nine other children (deceased)	Susanna; Wesley (b.1695)	Mehetabel; Wesley (b.1697)	John; Wesley (b.1703)	Mary; Vazeille	Charles; Wesley (b.1707)	Sarah; Gwynne
Seven other children (deceased)	Charles Wesley (b.1757)	Sarah (Sally) Wesley (b.1759)
Charlotte; Louise; Martin	Samuel Wesley (b.1766)	Sarah; Suter
Three children	Samuel Sebastian Wesley (b.1810)

Explanatory notes and reference sources

== See also ==
- Divergence between Anglicanism and Methodism
