= John Westley =

English non-conformist minister (1636–1678)

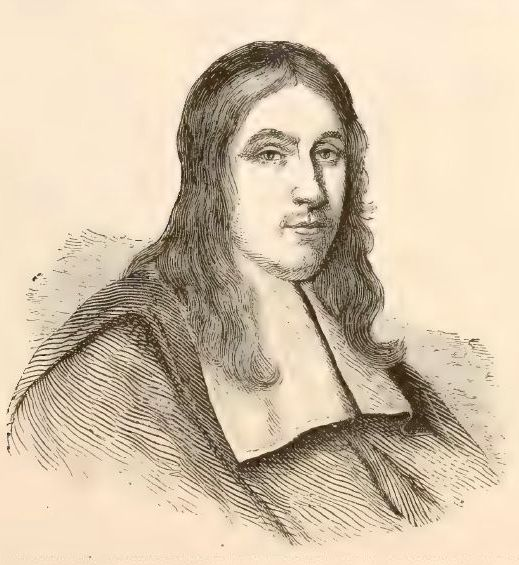
John Westley

John Westley (1636–1678; also spelled Wesley or Wesly) was an English nonconformist minister. He was the grandfather of John Wesley and Charles Wesley, the founders of Methodism.

== Life ==
John Wesly (his own spelling), or Wesley, was probably born at Bridport, Dorset, although some authorities claim he was born in Devon, the son of the Rev. Bartholomew Westley and Ann Colley, daughter of Sir Henry Colley of Carbery Castle in County Kildare, Ireland.

He was educated at Dorchester Grammar School and as a student of New Inn Hall, Oxford, He matriculated on 23 April 1651, and graduated B.A. on 23 January 1655, and M.A. on 4 July 1657. After his appointment as an evangelist, he preached at Melcombe Regis, Radipole, and other areas in Dorset. Never episcopally ordained, he was approved by Oliver Cromwell's Commission of Triers in 1658 and appointed Vicar of Winterborne Whitechurch.

The report of his interview in 1661 with Gilbert Ironside the elder, his diocesan, according to Alexander Gordon writing in the Dictionary of National Biography, shows him to have been an Independent. He was imprisoned for not using the Book of Common Prayer. He was ejected after the Act of Uniformity 1662. After the Conventicle Act 1664 he continued to preach in small gatherings at Preston and then Poole, until his death at Preston in 1678.

== Family ==
He married a daughter of John White; ; he was also related to Thomas Fuller. White, the "Patriarch of Dorchester", married a sister of Cornelius Burges.

Westley's eldest son was Timothy (born 1659). Their second son was Rev. Samuel Wesley, a High Church Anglican vicar and the father of John and Charles Wesley. A younger son, Matthew Wesley, remained a nonconformist, became a London apothecary, and died on 10 June 1737, leaving a son, Matthew, in India; he provided for some of his brother Samuel's daughters.

Wesley family tree

Wesley family tree
The family tree of the Wesleys, founders of Methodism.

Bartholomew Westley b.1596	Anne Colley
? a (daughter of John White)	John; Westley b.1638	Samuel Annesley b.1620
Timothy Wesley (born 1659)	Matthew Wesley	Samuel; Wesley (b.1662)	Susanna; Wesley (b.1669)
Samuel (Sammy); Wesley (b.1690)	Emilia (Emily); Wesley (b.1692)	Mary (Molly); Wesley (b.1696)	Anne; Wesley (b.1702)	Martha; Wesley (b.1706)	Kezia; Wesley (b.1709)
Nine other children (deceased)	Susanna; Wesley (b.1695)	Mehetabel; Wesley (b.1697)	John; Wesley (b.1703)	Mary; Vazeille	Charles; Wesley (b.1707)	Sarah; Gwynne
Seven other children (deceased)	Charles Wesley (b.1757)	Sarah (Sally) Wesley (b.1759)
Charlotte; Louise; Martin	Samuel Wesley (b.1766)	Sarah; Suter
Three children	Samuel Sebastian Wesley (b.1810)

Explanatory notes and reference sources

== Sources ==
- * Gordon, Alexander, Reverend (1899). Lee, Sidney (ed.). Dictionary of National Biography. Vol. LX. London, Smith, Elder & Co.
- Daniels, William Haven (1884). The illustrated history of Methodism in Great Britain, America, and Australia : from the days of the Wesleys to the present time. Vol. III. London Rivingtons.
- Matthews, A. G., "Calamy Revised", Oxford University Press, 1934, page 521.
- This article incorporates text from a publication now in the public domain: "Wesley, Samuel (1662-1735)". Dictionary of National Biography. London: Smith, Elder & Co. 1885–1900.
