= Sun of Unclouded Righteousness =

1758 Christian hymn

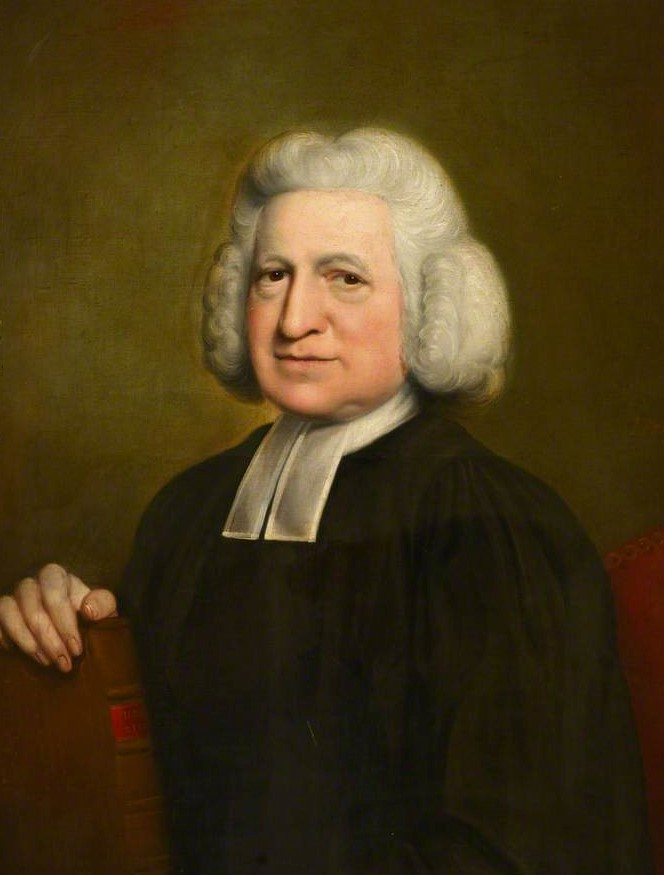
- Charles Wesley
- Genre: Hymn
- Written: 1758
- Text: Charles Wesley
- Based on: Malachi 4:2
- Meter: 8.8.8.8.8.8

"Sun of Unclouded Righteousness" is a little-known 1758 Christian hymn written by Charles Wesley, the brother of John Wesley, the founder of Methodism. It was written as an intercessory hymn praying for the salvation of Muslims and calls for their conversion to Christianity. It had fallen out of use by around 1880.

== History ==
Charles Wesley had a history of encouraging people to pray for the salvation of a variety of people. He wrote "Sun of Unclouded Righteousness" with the subtitle of "For the Turks" or "For the Mahometans". It was first published in 1758 in his Hymns of Intercession for All Mankind hymnal. It was intended as a prayer for salvation of Muslims and reflected the prevalent negative view of Islam promoted by Humphrey Prideaux in Great Britain at the time. It was also written to accompany the Collect for Good Friday in the Church of England's Book of Common Prayer. The hymn's title was based upon Malachi 4:2 where the Messiah, believed to be referring to Jesus by Christians, was called the "Sun of Righteousness".

Charles and his brother John Wesley had read Prideaux's work on early Islam while in Paris, and John noted that no opponents of Christianity had hurt it as much as Muhammad during the Early Muslim conquests. The hymn refers to that conquest in the line, "The smoke of the infernal cave,/Which half the Christian world o’erspread"; the "cave" mentioned there is Hira, where Islam teaches that Mohammed received revelation. Muhammad is referred to in the hymn as "that Imposter" and "that Arab Thief". Later versions of the third verse were changed to "E'en now the Moslem fiend expel, And chase his doctrine back to hell".

The hymn also engaged in polemics with regard to theological controversies of its day, namely the conflict between John Taylor's Unitarianism and Christians who held a trinitarian universalism perspective. The fourth stanza had always expressed the trinitarian universalism perspective; earlier versions of the third stanza ended with "The Unitarian fiend expel/And chase his doctrine back to hell" referring to Islam and its teaching, but also more explicitly to this controversy. The hymn was, in the words of a commenter on it, "an implicit challenge" to send missions to those regions.

== Later disfavour ==
"Sun of Unclouded Righteousness" largely stopped being published in hymnals around 1875. However, it was still published in the 1879 Methodist Hymnal. Despite Wesley's intent for it as a prayer for unbelievers, the hymn characterizes Islam negatively and expresses the stereotype of Arabs as, in the words of one commentator on the hymn, "militaristic marauders."

== Lyrics ==
The original lyrics as written by Wesley:

Sun of unclouded righteousness,
With healing in thy wings arise
A sad, benighted world to bless,
Which now in sin and error lies,
Wrapped in Egyptian night profound,
With chains of hellish darkness bound.

The smoke of the infernal cave,
Which half the Christian world o'erspread,
Disperse, thou heavenly Light, and save
The souls by that impostor led,
That Arab-thief, as Satan bold,
Who quite destroyed thine Asian fold.

O might the blood of sprinkling cry
For those who spurn the sprinkled blood!
Assert thy glorious Deity,
Stretch out thine arm, thou triune God,
The Unitarian fiend expel,
And chase his doctrine back to hell!

Come, Father, Son, and Holy Ghost,
Thou Three in One, and One in Three,
Resume thine own for ages lost,
Finish the dire apostasy;
Thine universal claim maintain,
And Lord of the creation reign!
