= John White (colonist priest) =

English clergyman

- Contemporary woodcut of White
- Born: 1575; Stanton St John, Oxfordshire, England
- Died: 1648 (aged 72–73); Dorchester, Dorset, England
- Occupation: Cleric
- Known for: Persuaded Charles I to grant a Royal Charter to the Massachusetts Bay Company for a new colony in North America.

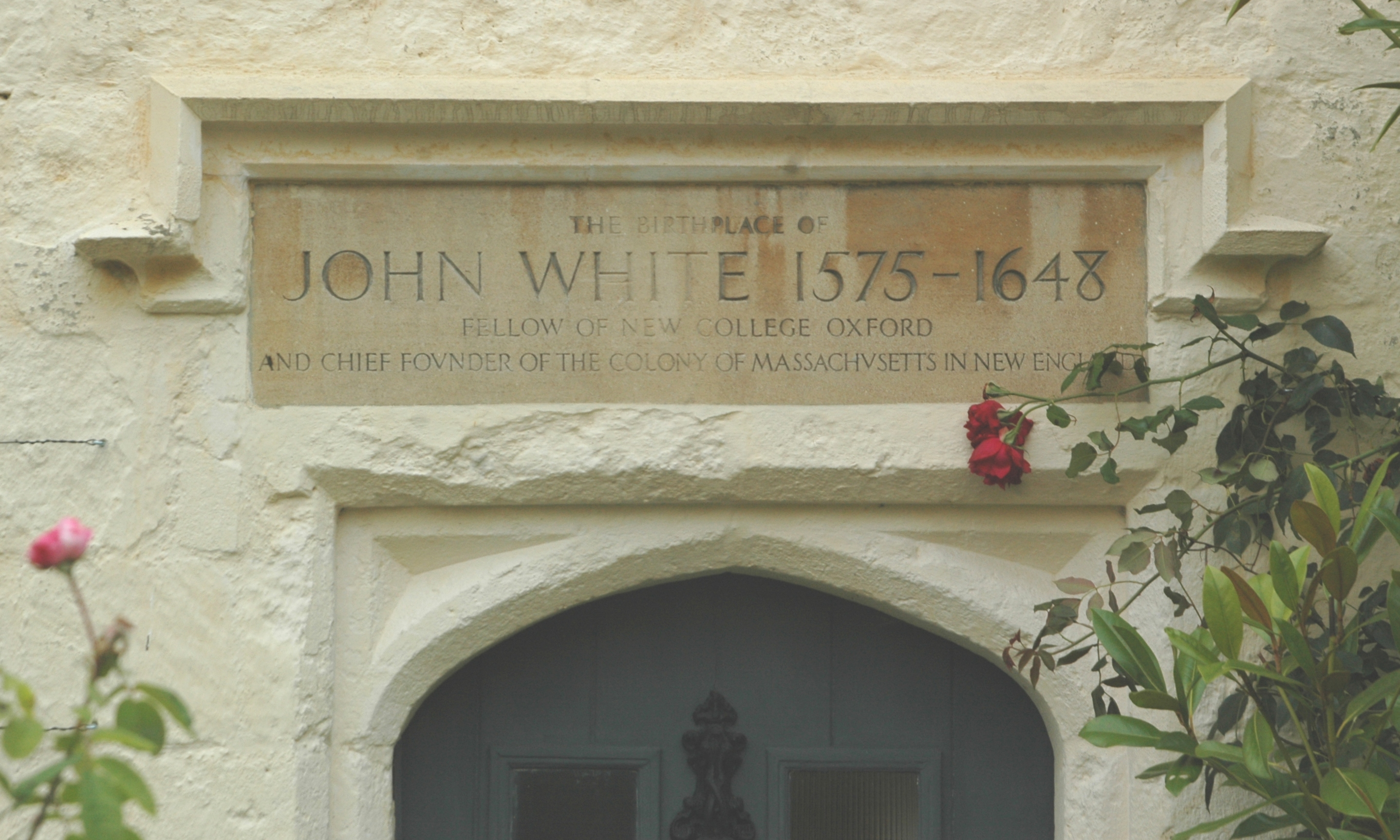
Carved plaque over the door of the 16th-century house in Stanton St John, Oxfordshire where John White was born

John White (1575 – 21 July 1648) was an English clergyman, the rector of a parish in Dorchester, Dorset. He was instrumental in obtaining charters for the New England Company and the Massachusetts Bay Company. He took a personal interest in the settlement of New England.

== Life ==
He was son of John White, yeoman, and his wife Isabel, daughter of John Bawle of Lichfield. He was born in the manor house at Stanton St John, Oxfordshire, where his father held a lease from New College, Oxford, and was baptised there on 6 January 1575. His elder brother, Josias, was rector of Hornchurch, Essex, 1614–23, and father of James White, a merchant of Boston, Massachusetts. In 1587 he entered Winchester College, and then was elected a fellow of New College in 1595. He graduated B.A. on 12 April 1597 and M.A. on 16 January 1601. He was appointed rector of Holy Trinity Church, Dorchester, in 1606, and for the rest of his life was identified with that place. He was a moderate conforming Puritan, concerned with reforming his parish.

John married Ann Burges, daughter of John Burges of Peterborough. They had three known children: John; Samuel (who married first Sarah Cuttance, daughter of shipmaster Edward Cuttance); and Josiah, who married first Mary Hallett.

== Dorchester Company of Adventurers ==
White himself never sailed to America. About 1623 he was involved in plans to send out a colony of Dorset men to settle in North America, allowing nonconformists to enjoy liberty of conscience. The attempt by the Dorchester Company to plant a colony at Cape Ann with Thomas Gardner as Overseer, at what would become Gloucester, Massachusetts, did not prove at first successful; in the previous decade, only about 500 English colonists had established a foothold, and this Company was wound up by 1625. White then recruited emigrants from the western counties of Dorset, Somerset and Devon, who set sail a few years later as a better-supported expedition and organised church aboard the ship Mary and John.

== Massachusetts Bay Company ==
White made many trips to London from Dorchester, working to obtain a patent in 1628 for lands between the parallel lines 3 miles (5 km) south of the Charles River to 3 miles north of the Merrimack River. He obtained the sponsorship of London merchants for a new colony in the New World. Concerned about conflicting claims to land given to several companies active in the north-east of the New World, the New England Company sought and was granted a Royal Charter on 4 March 1629, becoming the Massachusetts Bay Company. The Massachusetts Company had Richard Saltonstall as a chief shareholder. White was a member of the company, and on 30 November he was nominated one of the committee to value the joint stock. John Endecott was sent out as governor. Francis Higginson and Samuel Skelton were chosen and approved by White as ministers and sailed for the Dorchester colony on 4 May 1629 aboard the George Bonaventura. The charter enabled John Winthrop to hire a fleet of what would eventually comprise eleven ships, later called the Winthrop Fleet, to bring a new wave of emigrants across the Atlantic. John Winthrop sailed in the "Arbella", White holding a service on board before she sailed. The Mary and John was the first, carrying 140 people recruited by White. In June 1630 they landed and founded the settlement of Dorchester, Massachusetts. The eleven ships transported about 700 colonists to the New World. In 1632 and 1636 White was corresponding with John Winthrop (who urged White to visit the colony) about cod-lines and hooks to be sent, as well as flax of a suitable growth for Rhode Island. From 1630 to 1640 ships carried about 10,000 English colonists to the New World in what has been called the Great Migration.

Later in the 1630s White was under suspicion for his financial dealings. About 1635 or 1636 White was examined before Sir John Lambe about some papers seized in his study, and relating to a considerable sum of money sent by White to Dr John Stoughton. This turned out to be in part a legacy from one Philippa Pitt, bequeathed to White for good causes, and in part disbursements for the colonists in New England. White produced particulars of these in his note-books, and after six months' attendance before the court of high commission, he was discharged and the informant against him reprimanded.

== Westminster Assembly ==
When the First English Civil War broke out in 1642, Dorchester declared on the side of Parliament. A party of Prince Rupert's horse burst into White's house, plundered it, and carried off his books. He took refuge in London at the Savoy Hospital, where he ministered until, after Daniel Featley was sequestered, he was appointed rector of St Mary-at-Lambeth on 30 September 1643, and given the use of Featley's library until his own could be recovered. He was chosen one of the Westminster Assembly, and at their opening service in St Margaret's, Westminster (25 September 1643) prayed a full hour to prepare them for taking the Solemn League and Covenant. He regularly attended the sittings of the assembly, and signed the petition for the right to refuse the sacrament to scandalous persons, presented to the House of Lords, 12 August, was one of the assessors, and in 1645 was chosen on the committee of accommodation. White brought William Benn to Lambeth with him, whom he had called in 1629 to be the incumbent of All Saints Church, Dorchester.

On the death of Robert Pinck in November 1647, White was made warden of New College, Oxford but declined to go to Oxford because of bad health. His death took place on 21 July 1648, and he was buried in the porch of St Peter's Chapel (belonging to Trinity).
