= Listed parks and gardens in South West England =

The Register of Historic Parks and Gardens of Special Historic Interest in England, created in 1983, is administered by Historic England. It includes more than 1,600 sites, ranging from gardens of private houses, to cemeteries and public parks.

There are 306 registered parks and gardens in South West England. 31 are listed at grade I, the highest grade, 99 at grade II*, the middle grade, and 175 at grade II, the lowest grade.

== Key ==
Grade	Criteria
I	Parks and gardens of exceptional interest, sometimes considered to be internationally important
II*	Particularly important parks and gardens of more than special interest
II	Parks and gardens of national importance and special interest

== Parks and gardens ==
=== Bristol ===
Name	Grade	Location	Type	Completed (Note: The date given is the date used by Historic England as significant for the initial building or that of an important part in the structure's description.)	Grid ref. (Note: The grid reference is based on the British national grid reference system, sometimes known as OSGB36, used by the Ordnance Survey.) Geo-coordinates	Entry number (Note: The "List Entry Number" is a unique number assigned to each listed building and scheduled monument by Historic England.)	Image
Arnos Vale Cemetery	II*	Arnos Vale	Cemetery	1840	ST 60689 71520	1000559	Arnos Vale Cemetery
Ashton Court	II*	Long Ashton	Public park	Late 19th century	ST5475672241	1000560	Ashton Court
Blaise Castle and Hamlet	II*	Henbury	Public park	Late 18th century	ST5575878470	1001426	Blaise Castle and Hamlet
Brislington House	II*	Brislington	Hospital grounds	Early 19th century	ST6332570220	1001529	Brislington House
Former CEGB Headquarters landscape	II	Bishopsworth	Office grounds	1978	ST5629769458	1419382	Upload Photo
Goldney House	II*	Clifton	Garden	Mid 18th century	ST 57401 72734	1000444	Goldney House
Kings Weston House	II	Kingsweston	Public park	Late 18th century	ST 53910 77691	1000335	Kings Weston House
Oldbury Court	II	Fishponds	Public park	Late 18th century	ST 63448 76911	1000393	Oldbury Court More images
Royal Victoria Park	II	Southmead	Public park	Early 19th century	ST5752478613	1000360	Royal Victoria Park
Stoke Park	II	Stoke Gifford	Landscape park	18th century	ST 61723 77175	1000129	Stoke Park More images

=== Cornwall ===
Name	Grade	Location	Type	Completed	Grid ref. Geo-coordinates	Entry number	Image
Antony House	II*	Antony	Park and garden	1792	SX 42164 56453	1000647	Antony House
Barbara Hepworth Sculpture Garden	II	St Ives	Garden	1965	SW 51750 40585	1001488	Barbara Hepworth Sculpture Garden
Boconnoc	II*	Braddock	Park and garden	19th century	SX1383260490	1000350	Boconnoc
Caerhays Castle	II*	St Michael Caerhays	Park and garden	Early 20th century	SW9691442068	1000448	Caerhays Castle
Carclew	II	Mylor	Park and garden	19th century	SW7823138354	1000544	Carclew
Catchfrench	II	St Germans	Park and garden	1793	SX3071359535	1001314	Catchfrench
Chyverton Park	II	Perranzabuloe	Park and garden	Mid 19th century	SW 80056 51162	1000512	Chyverton Park
Cotehele	II*	Calstock	Park and garden	20th century	SX4223568824	1000648	Cotehele
The Downes	II	Hayle	Garden	Late 19th century	SW 55496 36773	1001305	The Downes
Endsleigh	I	Stokeclimsland	Park and garden	1814	SX 38831 77161	1000428	Endsleigh
Enys	II	Mylor	Park and garden	Early 19th century	SW 79008 36348	1001295	Enys
Falmouth General Cemetery	II	Falmouth	Cemetery	1855	SW 80289 31700	1001579	Falmouth General Cemetery
Glendurgan Garden	II	Mawnan	Garden	Mid 19th century	SW7720727864	1000649	Glendurgan Garden
Godolphin	II*	Crowan	Park and garden	15th century	SW 59683 31721	1001443	Godolphin
Heligan	II	Mevagissey	Park and garden	Early 19th century	SX 00316 45854	1000538	Heligan More images
Lamellen	II	St Kew	Garden	1900s	SX 05380 77316	1000650	Upload Photo
Lanhydrock House	II*	Lostwithiel	Park and garden	Mid 19th century	SX 09442 63329	1000449	Lanhydrock House
Lismore	II	Helston	Garden	Mid 19th century	SW 65804 27549	1001315	Upload Photo
Menabilly	II	Fowey	Park and garden	19th century	SX 09638 51904	1000651	Menabilly
Morrab Gardens	II	Penzance	Public park	1889	SW 47220 29980	1001492	Morrab Gardens
Mount Edgcumbe	I	Maker-with-Rame	Park and garden	Early 19th century	SX4373049470	1000134	Mount Edgcumbe
Pencarrow	II*	Egloshayle	Park and garden	1853	SX0388870831	1000652	Pencarrow
Penheale Manor	II	Egloskerry	Garden	1920s	SX2677587924	1000653	Penheale Manor
Penjerrick Garden	II	Budock	Garden	Mid 19th century	SW 78027 30753	1000513	Penjerrick Garden
Port Eliot	I	St Germans	Park and garden	1793	SX3530058944	1000426	Port Eliot
Prideaux Place	II	Padstow	Park and garden	1758	SW 91461 75374	1001249	Prideaux Place
St Michael's Mount	II	St Michael's Mount	Garden	19th century	SW 51478 29972	1000654	St Michael's Mount
Trebah	II	Mawnan	Garden	Mid 19th century	SW 76889 27346	1000345	Trebah
Tregrehan House	II*	Carlyon	Park and garden	Mid 19th century	SX0492053342	1000545	Tregrehan House
Tregothnan	II*	St Michael Penkevil	Park and garden	1809	SW 85876 41258	1000655	Tregothnan
Trelissick	II*	Feock	Park and garden	Mid 20th century	SW8310939683	1000656	Trelissick
Trelowarren	II	St Martin-in-Meneage	Park and garden	Early 19th century	SW 70343 25139	1001294	Trelowarren
Trengwainton Garden	II*	Penzance	Park and garden	Early 19th century	SW 44279 31115	1000657	Trengwainton Garden
Tresco	I	Tresco	Garden	19th century	SV 89373 14171	1000427	Tresco More images
Trewarthenick Estate	II	Tregony with Cuby	Park and garden	1793	SW9047644210	1000658	Upload Photo
Trewithen House	II*	Probus	Park and garden	Mid 18th century	SW 91172 47510	1000510	Trewithen House
Werrington Park	II	St Stephens by Launceston Rural	Park and garden	Mid 18th century	SX 33111 86805	1000514	Werrington Park

=== Devon ===
Name	Grade	Location	Type	Completed	Grid ref. Geo-coordinates	Entry number	Image
A La Ronde, and the Point-in-view	II	Exmouth	Park and garden	Late 18th century	SY 00633 83454	1000686	A La Ronde, and the Point-in-view
Arlington Court	II*	Loxhore	Park and garden	Early 19th century	SS 60773 39360	1000687	Arlington Court
Bicton	I	Bicton	Park and garden	18th century	SY 06824 86308	1000338	Bicton
Bridwell	II	Halberton	Park and garden	1779	ST 05855 12528	1000688	Bridwell
Cadhay	II	Ottery St Mary	Garden	1930s	SY 09017 96337	1000689	Cadhay
Castle Drogo	II*	Drewsteignton	Garden	1922	SX 72797 90074	1000452	Castle Drogo
Castle Hill	I	Filleigh	Park and garden	Early 18th century	SS 66901 28807	1000120	Castle Hill
Castle Tor	II	Torquay	Garden	1934	SX 93453 63705	1000131	Castle Tor
Civic Square	II	Plymouth	Public park	1962	SX 47713 54370	1001425	Civic Square
Coleton Fishacre	II*	Kingswear	Garden	1937	SX 91025 50666	1000690	Coleton Fishacre
Combe House	II	Gittisham	17th century	Park and garden	SY 14114 97837	1000691	Combe House
Connaught Gardens	II	Sidmouth	Public park	1934	SY 12059 86962	1001532	Connaught Gardens
Dartington Hall	II*	Dartington	Park and garden	Early 20th century	SX8004362583	1000453	Dartington Hall
Devonport Park	II	Plymouth	Public park	1861	SX 45477 55189	1001657	Devonport Park
Flete House	II	Modbury	Park and garden	Early 20th century	SX 62437 48634	1000692	Flete House
Ford Park Cemetery	II*	Plymouth	Cemetery	1848	SX 47659 55841	1001684	Ford Park Cemetery
Great Torrington Cemetery	II	Great Torrington	Cemetery	1854	SS 48659 19414	1001580	Great Torrington Cemetery
Greenway Estate	II	Kingswear	Park and garden	Mid 19th century	SX 87370 54816	1001686	Greenway Estate
Hayne Manor	II	Stowford	Park and garden	Early 19th century	SX 42088 86609	1000693	Upload Photo
HMP Dartmoor: American Prisoner of War Cemetery	II	Yelverton	Cemetery	1868	SX5881974179	1427525	HMP Dartmoor: American Prisoner of War Cemetery
HMP Dartmoor: French Prisoner of War Cemetery	II	Dartmoor Forest	Cemetery	1868	SX5874674253	1427528	Upload Photo
The Hoe	II	Plymouth	Public park	1873	SX 47771 53862	1001635	The Hoe
Italian Garden at Great Ambrook	II	Ipplepen	Garden	1912	SX8231865329	1419629	Italian Garden at Great Ambrook
Killerton	II*	Broad Clyst	Park and garden	Early 19th century	SS 96964 00465	1000694	Killerton
King's Nympton Park	II	Chulmleigh	Landscape park	Mid 18th century	SS 66236 19345	1001661	King's Nympton Park
Knightshayes Court	II*	Tiverton	Park and garden	Late 19th century	SS9542115298	1000487	Knightshayes Court
Langdon Court Hotel	II	Wembury	Park and garden	Mid 19th century	SX 51802 48873	1000695	Langdon Court Hotel
Lindridge House	II	Kingsteignton	Park and garden	1914	SX8936775604	1000357	Lindridge House
Luscombe Castle	I	Dawlish	Park and garden	Early 19th century	SX 94044 76650	1000486	Luscombe Castle
Lupton Park	II*	Brixham	Park and garden	Late 18th century	SX8988754911	1000696	Lupton Park
Mamhead House	II*	Mamhead	Park and garden	Early 19th century	SX9290081239	1000555	Mamhead House
Northernhay and Rougemont Gardens	II	Exeter	Public park	19th century	SX 92055 92905	1001631	Northernhay and Rougemont Gardens
Oldway Mansion	II	Paignton	Park and garden	1900s	SX 88821 61492	1001368	Oldway Mansion
Overbeck's	II	Salcombe	Garden	Early 20th century	SX 72787 37437	1000697	Overbeck's
Oxton House	II	Kenton	Landscape park	Late 18th century	SX 92964 82301	1001269	Oxton House
Plympton House	II	Plymouth	Garden	1720	SX 54645 55958	1001267	Plympton House
Powderham Castle	II*	Starcross	Park and garden	Mid 19th century	SX 96433 83926	1000698	Powderham Castle
Princess Gardens and Royal Terrace Gardens	II	Torquay	Public park	1894	SX 91530 63525	1001507	Princess Gardens and Royal Terrace Gardens
Rockbeare Manor	II	Rockbeare	Park and garden	Early 19th century	SY 02963 94037	1000193	Rockbeare Manor
Rousdon	II	Combpyne Rousdon	Park and garden	1870s	SY 29364 90369	1001441	Rousdon
St Bartholomew's Cemetery	II*	Exeter	Cemetery	1837	SX 91606 92560	1001582	St Bartholomew's Cemetery
Saltram House	II*	Plymouth	Park and garden	1770	SX5143155542	1000699	Saltram House
Saunton Court	II	Braunton	Garden	Early 20th century	SS 45711 37806	1000700	Saunton Court
Sharpham House	II*	Ashprington	Park and garden	1960s	SX 82127 57417	1000701	Sharpham House
Shobrooke Park	II	Upton Hellions	Park and garden	Mid 19th century	SS 85382 01286	1000702	Shobrooke Park
Simmons Park	II	Okehampton	Public park	1907	SX 58970 94627	1001625	Simmons Park
Stonelands House	II	Dawlish	Park and garden	1924	SX9489076919	1001647	Upload Photo
Stover Park	II	Teigngrace	Park and garden	Mid 19th century	SX 83964 74472	1001268	Stover Park
Sydenham House	II	Marystow	Garden	19th century	SX 43036 83851	1000703	Sydenham House
Tapeley	II*	Instow	Park and garden	Early 20th century	SS4703529202	1000704	Tapeley
Torquay Cemetery	II	Torquay	Cemetery	1853	SX 90491 65959	1001578	Torquay Cemetery
Ugbrooke Park	II*	Chudleigh	Park and garden	19th century	SX 87468 78127	1000705	Ugbrooke Park
Watcombe Park and Brunel Manor	II	Watcombe	Park and garden	1859	SX 91749 67743	1000141	Watcombe Park and Brunel Manor
Wood House	I	South Tawton	Park and garden	1905	SX 65511 95957	1000485	Upload Photo
Youlston Park	II	Shirwell	Landscape park	Mid 18th century	SS 58712 37274	1000706	Youlston Park

=== Dorset ===
Name	Grade	Location	Type	Completed	Grid ref. Geo-coordinates	Entry number	Image
Abbotsbury Gardens	I	Abbotsbury	Garden	Late 19th century	SY 56537 84933	1000707	Abbotsbury Gardens More images
Anderson Manor	II	Anderson	Garden	1913	SY 88163 97359	1000708	Anderson Manor
Athelhampton	I	Athelhampton	Garden	1890s	SY7685794330	1000430	Athelhampton
Beaminster Manor	II	Beaminster	Park and garden	Late 18th century	ST4863601829	1000709	Upload Photo
Bingham's Melcombe	II*	Melcombe Horsey	Garden	16th century	ST 77190 02177	1000710	Bingham's Melcombe
Borough Gardens	II	Dorchester	Public park	1896	SY 68935 90461	1001559	Borough Gardens More images
Boveridge House School	II	Cranborne	Park and garden	1921	SU 06952 14480	1000711	Boveridge House School
Bridehead	II	Winterbourne Steepleton	Park and garden	Early 19th century	SY6004989465	1000712	Bridehead
Chantmarle	II*	Cattistock	Garden	1900s	ST5882402160	1000477	Chantmarle
Charborough House	II	Lytchett Matravers	Park and garden	1812	SY9270198990	1000713	Charborough House
Compton Acres	II*	Poole	Garden	1930s	SZ 05270 89559	1000714	Compton Acres
Cranborne Manor	II*	Cranborne	Garden	Early 20th century	SU 05368 13176	1000715	Cranborne Manor
Creech Grange	II*	Steeple	Park and garden	Mid 18th century	SY 90674 82467	1000532	Creech Grange
Crichel House	II*	Witchampton	Landscape park	18th century	ST 99513 07871	1000716	Crichel House
Downe Hall	II	Bridport	Park and garden	Late 18th century	SY 46803 93215	1001353	Upload Photo
Durlston Country Park	II	Swanage	Public park	1887	SZ 03333 77141	1001701	Durlston Country Park
Eastbury Park	II*	Tarrant Gunville	Park and garden	Early 18th century	ST9338113026	1000549	Eastbury Park
Encombe House	II*	Church Knowle	18th century	Landscape park	SY 94469 78303	1000429	Encombe House
Forde Abbey	II*	Thorncombe	Park and garden	Early 20th century	ST 35975 04940	1000717	Forde Abbey
Kingston Lacy	II	Pamphill	Park and garden	Late 19th century	ST 96431 02984	1000718	Kingston Lacy
Kingston Maurward House	II*	Stinsford	Park and garden	1920	SY 71603 91583	1000719	Kingston Maurward House
Lulworth Castle	II*	Coombe Keynes	Garden	17th century	SY 84881 82528	1000720	Lulworth Castle
Mapperton House	II*	Mapperton	Park and garden	1927	SY5036399533	1000423	Mapperton House
Melbury House	II*	Melbury Sampford	Park and garden	18th century	ST5766506455	1000531	Melbury House
Milton Abbey	II*	Hilton	Landscape park	1782	ST7928003609	1000721	Milton Abbey
Minterne House	II*	Minterne Magna	Landscape park	Late 18th century	ST6612004246	1000527	Minterne House
Parnham House	II*	Beaminster	Garden	1914	ST4757000323	1000722	Parnham House
Poole Cemetery	II	Poole	Cemetery	1854	SZ 02658 92760	1001595	Poole Cemetery
Poole Park	II	Poole	Public park	1890	SZ 02450 90962	1001588	Poole Park
Ranston	II	Iwerne Stepleton	Landscape park	1770s	ST 86402 11999	1001256	Ranston
Rushmore Park	II*	Farnham	Landscape park	1900	ST 95575 16877	1000542	Rushmore Park
St Giles' House	II*	Wimborne St Giles	Landscape park	1754	SU0238813050	1000723	St Giles' House
Sherborne Castle	I	Goathill	Park and garden	Mid 18th century	ST 65861 16382	1000454	Sherborne Castle
Steeple Manor	II	Steeple	Garden	1924	SY9119781060	1400620	Steeple Manor
Stepleton House	II	Stourpaine	Landscape park	1750s	ST 87217 11519	1001266	Stepleton House
Town Walks	II	Dorchester	Promenade	1712	SY 68969 91003	1001594	Town Walks
Upper, Central and Lower Pleasure Gardens, and Coy Pond Gardens	II	Bournemouth	Public park	Mid 19th century	SZ 07439 91736	1000724	Upper, Central and Lower Pleasure Gardens, and Coy Pond Gardens
Waterston Manor	II	Waterston	Garden	1916	SY7358595178	1000725	Waterston Manor
Wimborne Road Cemetery	II	Bournemouth	Cemetery	1878	SZ 09021 92696	1000726	Wimborne Road Cemetery

=== Gloucestershire ===
Name	Grade	Location	Type	Completed	Grid ref. Geo-coordinates	Entry number	Image
Abbotswood	II*	Stow on the Wold	Park and garden	1902	SP1806426043	1000748	Abbotswood
Adlestrop Park	II*	Adlestrop	Park and garden	1800	SP 24278 26653	1000750	Adlestrop Park
Alderley House	II	Alderley	Garden	1960s	ST 76872 91005	1000751	Alderley House
Badminton House	I	Acton Turville	Park and garden	Early 18th century	ST8013284404	1000561	Badminton House
Barnsley House	II*	Barnsley	Garden	1970s	SP 07683 04910	1001646	Barnsley House
Barnsley Park	II*	Barnsley	Park and garden	1700	SP 08068 05942	1000753	Barnsley Park
Barrington Park	II*	Barrington	Park and garden	Mid 18th century	SP 19965 12275	1000754	Barrington Park
Batsford Arboretum	II*	Batsford	Park and garden	1890s	SP 18264 33804	1000431	Batsford Arboretum
Berkeley Castle	II*	Berkeley	Park and garden	20th century	ST 66893 97213	1000755	Berkeley Castle
Bouncer's Lane Cemetery	II	Cheltenham	Cemetery	1864	SO 97034 23084	1000855	Bouncer's Lane Cemetery
Bradley Court	II	Wotton-under-Edge	Garden	1700	ST 74550 93755	1000756	Bradley Court
Chastleton House	II*	Adlestrop	Park and garden	17th century	SP 24853 28982	1001090	Chastleton House
Chavenage House	II	Beverston	Park and garden	Early 19th century	ST 87206 94855	1000757	Chavenage House
Church House	II	Lechlade	Garden	18th century	SU 21514 99440	1000769	Church House
Cirencester Park	I	Cirencester	Park and garden	1775	SO9791603285	1000432	Cirencester Park
Clearwell Castle	II	Newland	Park and garden	Late 19th century	SO5677407804	1000758	Clearwell Castle
Cowley Manor	II*	Coberley	Park and garden	Late 19th century	SO 96450 14333	1000759	Cowley Manor
Daylesford House	II*	Adlestrop	Park and garden	1780s	SP 25047 26350	1000760	Daylesford House
Dodington Park	II*	Dodington	Landscape park	1764	ST7513879567	1000566	Dodington Park
Dowdeswell Court	II	Dowdeswell	Park and garden	Mid 19th century	SP 00222 19171	1001639	Dowdeswell Court
Dyrham Park	II*	Dyrham and Hinton	Park and garden	Early 19th century	ST 74424 75821	1000443	Dyrham Park
Estcourt Park	II	Shipton Moyne	Park and garden	Mid 19th century	ST 90015 91035	1001437	Estcourt Park
Eyford Park	II	Upper Slaughter	Park and garden	18th century	SP 14654 24628	1000762	Eyford Park
Flaxley Abbey	II	Blaisdon	Park and garden	1960s	SO 68984 15367	1000763	Flaxley Abbey
Frampton Court	II*	Frampton on Severn	Park and garden	Early 19th century	SO 75111 07810	1000764	Frampton Court
Gatcombe Park	II	Minchinhampton	Landscape park	1797	ST 88148 99169	1000765	Gatcombe Park
Glenfall House	II	Cheltenham	Park and garden	Early 19th century	SO9805221847	1426494	Glenfall House
Great Rissington Manor	II	Great Rissington	Garden	1927	SP 19422 17100	1000766	Great Rissington Manor
Hatherop Castle	II	Quenington	Park and garden	Mid 19th century	SP1622704589	1000767	Hatherop Castle
Hidcote Manor Garden	I	Ebrington	Garden	1948	SP 17615 42931	1000768	Hidcote Manor Garden
Highnam Court	II*	Highnam	Park and garden	Mid 19th century	SO 79518 19372	1000140	Highnam Court
Kiftsgate Court Gardens	II	Ebrington	Garden	1920s	SP1672642988	1000456	Kiftsgate Court Gardens
Kingcombe Garden	II	Chipping Campden	Garden	1936	SP1382239336	1455869	Upload Photo
Lodge Park	I	Northleach with Eastington	Park and garden	1620s	SP1373212434	1000770	Lodge Park
Lypiatt Park	II*	Lypiatt	Park and garden	Early 19th century	SO8894506010	1000771	Lypiatt Park
Miserden Park	II*	Miserden	Park and garden	1920s	SO 94324 09064	1000772	Miserden Park
Mount House	II	Alderley	Garden	1890	ST 76897 90728	1000752	Mount House
Nether Lypiatt Manor	II	Brimscombe and Thrupp	Garden	18th century	SO 87389 03707	1000773	Nether Lypiatt Manor
Newark Park	II	Wotton-under-Edge	Park and garden	1790s	ST7828393424	1000774	Newark Park
Notgrove Manor	II	Notgrove	Park and garden	1914	SP1063119806	1000775	Notgrove Manor
Owlpen Manor	II	Owlpen	Garden	1600	ST 80049 98371	1000776	Owlpen Manor
Painswick House	II*	Painswick	Park and garden	1740s	SO 86396 10463	1000123	Painswick House
Pinbury Park	II	Duntisbourne Rouse	Park and garden	Early 20th century	SO9547104822	1000778	Pinbury Park
Pittville Park	II	Cheltenham	Public park	1842	SO 95115 23484	1000196	Pittville Park
Rodmarton Manor	II*	Rodmarton	Garden	1909	ST 94279 97686	1000779	Rodmarton Manor
St Mary's	II	Painswick	Churchyard	Late 18th century	SO 86639 09653	1000777	St Mary's
Sezincote House	I	Sezincote	Park and garden	Early 19th century	SP1715331293	1000433	Sezincote House
Sherborne House	II	Sherborne	Park and garden	Late 16th century	SP 16595 14168	1000780	Sherborne House
Snowshill Manor	II	Snowshill	Garden	1920s	SP 09620 33829	1000781	Snowshill Manor
Spring Hill Park	II	Snowshill	Park and garden	Late 18th century	SP1287233848	1000896	Spring Hill Park
Stancombe Park	I	North Nibley	Park and garden	Early 19th century	ST 73888 97175	1000782	Stancombe Park
Stanway House	I	Stanway	Park and garden	Mid 18th century	SP 06192 32193	1000480	Stanway House
Stowell Park	II	Yanworth	Park and garden	Late 19th century	SP 08834 12886	1000783	Stowell Park
Sudeley Castle	II*	Sudeley	Park and garden	1891	SP 02935 27688	1000784	Sudeley Castle
Tewkesbury Cemetery	II	Tewkesbury	Cemetery	1857	SO 89089 31981	1001711	Tewkesbury Cemetery
Thornbury Castle	II	Thornbury	Garden	Early 16th century	ST 63373 90698	1000569	Thornbury Castle
Toddington Manor	II	Toddington	Park and garden	Late 18th century	SP 03231 33347	1000785	Toddington Manor
Tortworth Court	II*	Tortworth	Park and garden	17th century	ST 69376 91740	1000394	Tortworth Court
Warmley House	II	Oldland	Garden	1769	ST 66882 72998	1000356	Warmley House
Westbury Court Garden	II*	Westbury-on-Severn	Early 18th century	Garden	SO 71835 13863	1000786	Westbury Court Garden
Westonbirt Arboretum	I	Didmarton	Arboretum	1860	ST8525290049	1000457	Westonbirt Arboretum
Woodchester Park	II	King's Stanley	Park and garden	1830s	SO8165201663	1000788	Woodchester Park

=== Somerset ===
Name	Grade	Location	Type	Completed	Grid ref. Geo-coordinates	Entry number	Image
Abbey Cemetery	II*	Bath	Cemetery	1843	ST 75878 63613	1001351	Abbey Cemetery
Ammerdown House	II*	Hemington	Park and garden	1901	ST7134952805	1001136	Ammerdown House
Babington House	II	Mells	Park and garden	19th century	ST 70571 50889	1001137	Babington House
Barley Wood	II	Wrington	Park and garden	1801	ST 48029 63021	1001404	Barley Wood
Barrington Court	II*	Barrington	Garden	1920s	ST3959718257	1000505	Barrington Court
Barrow Court	II	Flax Bourton	Park and garden	1897	ST5123368588	1000562	Barrow Court
Barwick Park	II*	Barwick	Park and garden	Late 18th century	ST 55946 12980	1000411	Barwick Park
Bishop's Palace, Wells Cathedral	II*	Wells	Park and garden	Early 19th century	ST5546345511	1001138	Bishop's Palace, Wells Cathedral
Bristol University Botanic Garden and Rayne Thatch	II	Long Ashton	Botanical garden	1910	ST 55795 72985	1001260	Bristol University Botanic Garden and Rayne Thatch
Brympton d'Evercy	II*	West Coker	Garden	20th century	ST 52044 15430	1000506	Brympton d'Evercy
Burton Pynsent House	II	Fivehead	Park and garden	Early 20th century	ST3741724920	1001139	Burton Pynsent House
The Chantry	II*	Whatley	Park and garden	Early 19th century	ST 71987 46248	1001140	The Chantry
Claverton Manor	II	Claverton	Park and garden	1830	ST 78410 64146	1000564	Claverton Manor
Clevedon Court	II*	Clevedon	Garden	Early 18th century	ST4187571767	1000565	Clevedon Court
Compton Castle	II	Compton Pauncefoot	Garden	1825	ST6483225556	1408333	Compton Castle
Cothelstone Manor	II*	Cothelstone	Garden	17th century	ST 18186 31787	1001141	Cothelstone Manor
Cricket House	II*	Winsham	Park and garden	Early 19th century	ST 37414 08639	1001142	Cricket House
Crowcombe Court	II	Crowcombe	Park and garden	Early 18th century	ST1423237634	1001143	Crowcombe Court
Crowe Hall	II	Widcombe	Garden	1870s	ST 76007 63945	1000548	Crowe Hall
Dunster Castle	II*	Carhampton	Park and garden	Late 18th century	SS 99068 44218	1000467	Dunster Castle
East Lambrook Manor	I	Kingsbury Episcopi	Garden	1969	ST 43126 18951	1001247	East Lambrook Manor
Fairfield	II	Stogursey	Park and garden	Late 18th century	ST 18732 42915	1001144	Fairfield
Grove Park	II	Weston-super-Mare	Public park	1891	ST 31870 61952	1001658	Grove Park
Halswell House	II	Broomfield	Park and garden	Late 18th century	ST2497533630	1001145	Halswell House
Hapsford House	II	Great Elm	Park and garden	Early 19th century	ST 75958 49535	1001468	Hapsford House
Hatch Court	II	Hatch Beauchamp	Park and garden	Mid 18th century	ST 30547 21140	1001146	Hatch Court
Hazlegrove House	II	Queen Camel	Park and garden	18th century	ST5974026233	1000422	Hazlegrove House
Hedgemead Park	II	Bath	Public park	1889	ST 75052 65618	1001623	Hedgemead Park
Hestercombe Gardens	I	Cheddon Fitzpaine	Park and garden	Late 18th century	ST 24147 28896	1000437	Hestercombe Gardens
Highbridge Garden of Remembrance	II	Highbridge	Memorial garden	1965	ST3203747335	1442317	Upload Photo
Hinton House	II	West Crewkerne	Park and garden	Mid 18th century	ST 41046 11360	1001147	Hinton House
Kelston Park	II*	Kelston	Landscape park	1768	ST6993566646	1000536	Kelston Park
Lansdown Cemetery and Beckford's Tower	II	Lansdown	Cemetery	1848	ST7379267520	1000563	Lansdown Cemetery and Beckford's Tower
Leigh Court	II	Abbots Leigh	Park and garden	1810s	ST 54319 74811	1000407	Leigh Court
Lytes Cary	II	The Charltons	Park and garden	Early 20th century	ST 53260 26573	1001148	Lytes Cary
Marston Bigot Park	II	Selwood	Park and garden	1745	ST7590644811	1001149	Marston Bigot Park
Mells Manor	I	Mells	Garden	1910	ST 72708 49288	1000442	Mells Manor
Mells Park	II	Leigh-on-Mendip	Park and garden	19th century	ST 71116 48318	1001150	Mells Park
Milton Lodge and the Combe	II	Wells	Park and garden	Early 20th century	ST 54651 46764	1001277	Milton Lodge and the Combe
Montacute House	I	Montacute	Park and garden	Mid 19th century	ST 49721 16455	1000468	Montacute House
Nettlecombe Court	II	Monksilver	Park and garden	Late 18th century	ST 05693 37581	1001152	Nettlecombe Court
Newton Park	II*	Newton St Loe	Landscape park	1761	ST 69529 64332	1000567	Newton Park
Newton Surmaville	II	Yeovil	Park and garden	1918	ST 56721 15287	1001153	Newton Surmaville
Nynehead Court	II*	Langford Budville	Park and garden	Mid 19th century	ST1342122474	1000528	Nynehead Court
Gardens at Oakwood/Bathwick Tower and Smallcombe House	II	Bath	Garden	Early 19th century	ST 76689 64296	1001703	Upload Photo
Orchardleigh Estate	II*	Buckland Dinham	Park and garden	1856	ST7710651503	1000382	Orchardleigh Estate
Parade Gardens	II	Bath	Public park	1738	ST 75263 64768	1001630	Parade Gardens
Poundisford Park	II	Trull	Park and garden	17th century	ST 21796 20401	1001154	Poundisford Park
Prior Park	I	Combe Down	Landscape park	1740	ST 76205 62918	1000144	Prior Park
Redlynch Park	II	Bruton	Park and garden	Mid 18th century	ST6901232274	1000420	Redlynch Park
Royal Victoria Park	I	Bath	Public park	1830	ST 74248 65298	1001257	Royal Victoria Park
St Audries Park	II	West Quantoxhead	Park and garden	Mid 19th century	ST 10841 42226	1001155	St Audries Park
St Catherine's Court	II*	St Catherine	Park and garden	1610	ST 77903 70086	1000568	St Catherine's Court
Ston Easton Park	II	Ston Easton	Park and garden	Early 19th century	ST 62661 53434	1000128	Ston Easton Park
Stourhead	I	Stourton with Gasper	Park and garden	Early 19th century	ST 76395 34825	1000471	Stourhead
Sydney Gardens	II	Bath	Public park	1795	ST 75784 65314	1001258	Sydney Gardens
Tintinhull House	II	Tintinhull	Garden	Early 20th century	ST 50209 19776	1001156	Tintinhull House
Tyntesfield	II*	Wraxall and Failand	Park and garden	19th century	ST 50679 70165	1000570	Tyntesfield
Ven House	II	Purse Caundle	Park and garden	Early 18th century	ST 68207 18485	1001157	Ven House
Wayford Manor House	II	Crewkerne	Garden	1902	ST4049706539	1001158	Wayford Manor House
Wellington Park	II*	Wellington	Public park	1903	ST 13385 20649	1001370	Wellington Park
Widcombe Manor House	II	Widcombe	Garden	18th century	ST 75854 63858	1000571	Widcombe Manor House

=== Wiltshire ===
Name	Grade	Location	Type	Completed	Grid ref. Geo-coordinates	Entry number	Image
Amesbury Abbey	II*	Amesbury	Park and garden	1760s	SU1455841888	1000469	Amesbury Abbey
Belcombe Court	II*	Bradford-on-Avon	Landscape park	Mid 18th century	ST 81522 60718	1001227	Belcombe Court
Biddesden House	II	Ludgershall	Park and garden	19th century	ST 81522 60718	1001228	Biddesden House
Bourne Hill House Gardens	II	Salisbury	Garden	1770s	SU 14787 30390	1001700	Bourne Hill House Gardens
Bowood House	I	Derry Hill & Studley	Park and garden	1851	ST 97561 69689	1000336	Bowood House
Conock Manor	II	Urchfont	Park and garden	1820	SU0653457391	1001229	Conock Manor
Corsham Court	II*	Corsham	Landscape park	1760	ST8756171050	1000470	Corsham Court
The Courts Garden	II	Holt	Garden	1910	ST8605061748	1001230	The Courts Garden
Dinton Park	II	Dinton	Park and garden	Late 18th century	SU 00554 31742	1001231	Dinton Park
Fonthill	II*	Chilmark	Landscape park	1750	ST9160631687	1000322	Fonthill
Great Chalfield Manor	II	Holt	Garden	1906	ST 86341 63948	1001232	Great Chalfield Manor
The Hall	II	Bradford-on-Avon	Garden	Mid 19th century	ST 82936 60840	1001233	The Hall
Hatch House	II	West Tisbury	Garden	1906	ST 90699 27988	1001234	Hatch House
Hazelbury Manor	II	Box	Garden	Early 17th century	ST 83691 68116	1000520	Hazelbury Manor
Heale House	II*	Woodford, Wiltshire	Garden	1911	SU 12669 36422	1001235	Heale House
Iford Manor	I	Westwood	Park and garden	1907	ST 79957 59140	1000438	Iford Manor
Lacock Abbey	II	Lacock	Park and garden	Early 18th century	ST 91965 68487	1001236	Lacock Abbey
Lake House	II	Wilsford cum Lake	Park and garden	1937	SU 13260 38775	1001237	Lake House
Larmer Tree Gardens	II*	Tollard Royal	Park	1885	ST 94243 16918	1000478	Larmer Tree Gardens
Littlecote House	II	Hungerford	Park and garden	Early 18th century	SU2969370297	1000479	Littlecote House
Longford Castle	II*	Downton	Park and garden	Early 19th century	SU 16827 26726	1000424	Longford Castle
Longleat	I	Longbridge Deverill	Park and garden	1804	ST 82013 43098	1000439	Longleat
Lydiard Park	II	Lydiard Tregoze	Park and garden	Mid 18th century	SU 09686 84926	1001238	Lydiard Park
Marlborough College	II	Marlborough	Garden	Early 18th century	SU1846368649	1001239	Marlborough College
The Moot and Moot House	II*	Downton	Garden	Mid 18th century	SU 18093 21355	1000136	The Moot and Moot House
North Canonry	II	Salisbury	Garden	18th century	SU 14061 29615	1001240	North Canonry
Oare House	II	Wilcot	Garden	1925	SU 15623 62984	1001241	Oare House
Queen's Park	II	Swindon	Public park	1964	SU 15651 84276	1001549	Queen's Park
Ramsbury Manor	II	Ramsbury	Park and garden	Late 18th century	SU 25760 70912	1001242	Ramsbury Manor
Salisbury Crematorium	II	Salisbury	Crematorium	1960	SU1523631420	1410977	Upload Photo
Sheldon Manor	II	Chippenham Without	Garden	1935	ST 88694 74156	1001243	Sheldon Manor
Shute House Gardens	II	Donhead St Mary	Garden	1988	ST9042424412	1468669	Shute House Gardens
Spye Park	II	Lacock	Park and garden	Late 18th century	ST 95356 67442	1001619	Spye Park
Tottenham House and Savernake Forest	II*	Burbage	Park and garden	18th century	SU2285566376	1000472	Tottenham House and Savernake Forest
Town Gardens	II	Swindon	Public park	1902	SU 15201 83432	1001477	Town Gardens
Trafalgar House	II	Downton	Park and garden	Mid 19th century	SU 18653 23736	1001244	Trafalgar House
Trowbridge General Cemetery	II	Trowbridge	Cemetery	1856	ST 86214 59005	1001587	Trowbridge General Cemetery
Wardour Castle and Old Wardour Castle	II*	Ansty	Park and garden	1770s	ST 93295 25954	1000507	Wardour Castle and Old Wardour Castle
Wilbury House	II	Cholderton	Park and garden	18th century	SU 22269 41277	1001245	Wilbury House
Wilton House	I	Stratford Toney	Park and garden	Early 19th century	SU 09443 29678	1000440	Wilton House
