= Hazel Grove (disambiguation) =

Hazel Grove is a village in Greater Manchester, England.

Hazel Grove, Hazelgrove or Hazlegrove may also refer to:

== People ==
- Claire Hazelgrove (born 1988), British politician

== Places ==
- Hazel Grove (constituency), Greater Manchester, England
- Hazel Grove (Stockport electoral ward), Greater Manchester, England
- Hazel Grove, Alberta, Canada
- Hazel Grove Township, North Dakota, United States
- Hazlegrove House, Sparkford, England
- Hazlegrove Preparatory School, Sparkford, England

== See also ==
- Haselgrove (disambiguation)
