= Lead Me Lord =

Lead Me, Lord may refer to:

- Lead Me Lord, album by Neal Morse
- Lead me, Lord, short anthem by Samuel Sebastian Wesley extract from Praise the Lord, O my soul
- Lead Me Lord, song by Basil Valdez
