= King's School, Bruton =

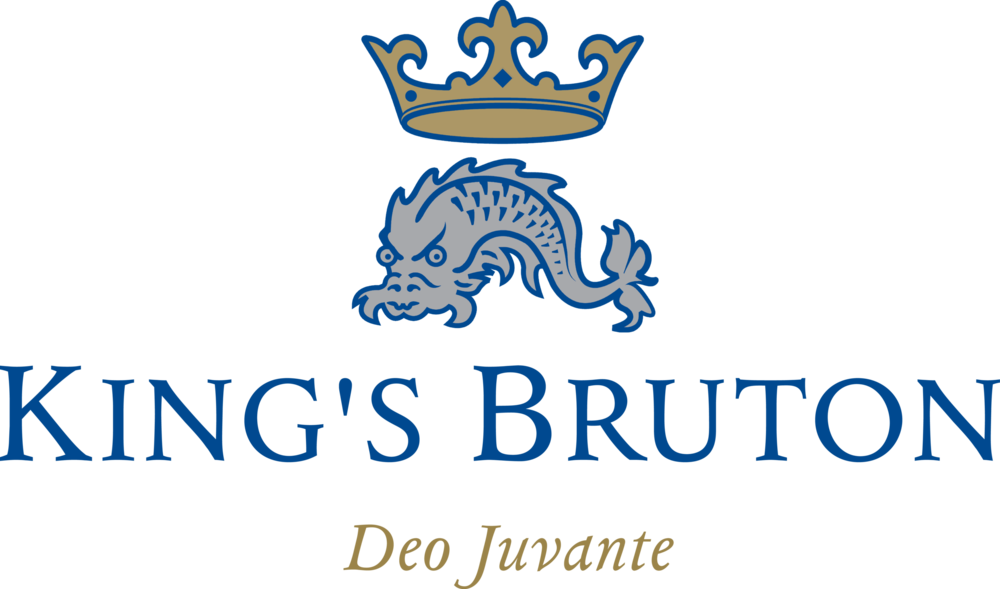

Location
- Plox; Bruton, Somerset, BA10 0ED; England; 51.1103°N 2.4544°W

Information
- Type: Public school Private day and boarding
- Motto: Latin: Deo Juvante (With god’s help)
- Religious affiliation: Church of England
- Established: 1519; 507 years ago, re-founded 1550 Edward VI
- Founder: Richard FitzJames, Sir John FitzJames, William Gilbert
- Local authority: [[Somerset Council]]
- Department for Education URN: 123905 Tables
- Headmaster: Matt Radley
- Chaplain: George Beverly
- Gender: Mixed
- Age: 13 to 18
- Enrolment: 360
- Houses: New, Blackford, Lyon, Priory, Arion, Wellesley
- Colours: Blue and Gold
- Song: Carmen Brutoniense
- Publication: The Dolphin
- Affiliations: HMC
- Former pupils: Old Brutonians
- Campus: 223,251.85 metres squared semi-rural campus
- Website: http://www.kingsbruton.com/

King's Bruton is an independent HMC co-educational boarding and day school in the English public school tradition located in Bruton, Somerset. It was founded in 1519 by Richard FitzJames, making it one of the oldest schools in the United Kingdom and since the Dissolution of the Monasteries, has been in continuous operation for over 470 years. In 1550 the school received royal foundation status during the reign of Edward VI.

== History ==
King's School was officially founded on 29 September 1519 by Richard Fitzjames, Bishop of London; Sir John Fitzjames, the Attorney General; and the Abbott of Bruton Monastery, William Gilbert. After the Dissolution of the Monasteries, the school was re-founded by a Royal Charter from King Edward VI.

King's School Bruton once owned a copy of Magna Carta dating from 1297, which it sold to the Australian Government in 1952 for £12,500.

Girls have attended the school's sixth form since the 1960s before King's became fully co-educational in the late 1990s.

== Facilities ==
The Basil Wright Building was opened in 2009 and houses the Headmaster's, Bursar's and Registrar's offices.

On 29 March 2019, to mark the school's quincentenary, King's hosted Queen Elizabeth II during a wider Royal visit to the West Country. During the visit the Queen opened a new music school named in her honour, equipped with a Mac room, recording studios, practice rooms and the Hauser & Wirth Recital Hall, a dedicated recital venue used for concerts and choir practices.

== King's Bruton Foundation ==
The King's School, Bruton Foundation comprises three schools - King's Bruton, Hazlegrove Preparatory School and Sunny Hill Nursery.

In 1947, following World War II, King's Bruton Junior School moved from Plox House to a site approximately 10 miles South West at Hazlegrove House to satisfy increasing demand for places. The school has since been known as 'Hazlegrove Prep School,' and acts as the preparatory and main feeder school for King's Bruton, with around a third of each year group moving directly to King's at age 13.

In March 2022, it was announced that the foundation would be acquiring the now defunct Bruton School for Girls, for an undisclosed amount. The acquisition was made in an attempt to boost links, attendance and finances at the school, thus prospering the entire foundation. Unfortunately, with an expected pupil roll of 45 in September 2022 (down on 199 in 2018), the foundation deemed it unviable to continue operations, and in May 2022 announced that the school would close at the end of the 2021/22 academic year.

== Headmasters ==
This list is incomplete

- 1972–1985: Hubert Doggart
- 2009–2025: Ian Wilmshurst
- 2025– Matt Radley

== Combined Cadet Force ==
Kings runs a Combined Cadet Force contingent.
