= Borough Gardens, Dorchester =

Park in Dorchester, Dorset, England

Borough Gardens
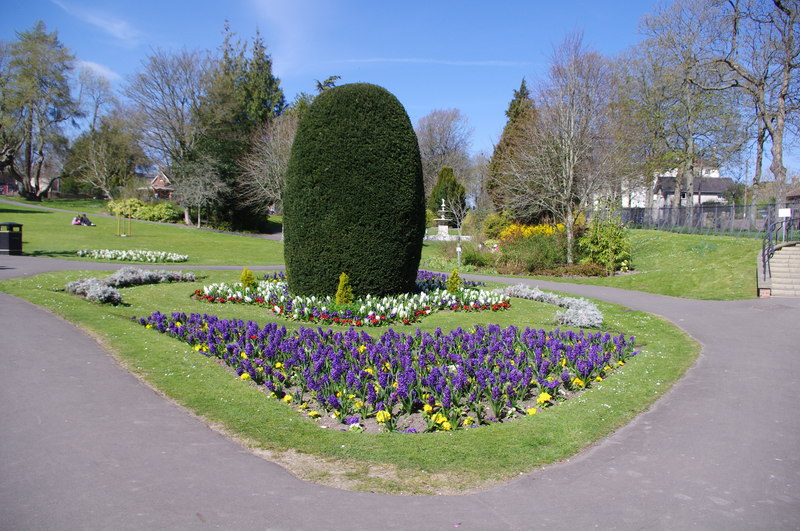
- Interactive map of Borough Gardens
- Location: Dorchester, Dorset
- OS grid: SY 68935 90461
- Coordinates: 50°42′46.6″N 2°26′28.9″W
- Area: 4 hectares (10 acres)
- Opened: 1896
- Designer: William Goldring
- Operator: Dorchester Town Council
- Designation: Grade II
- Website: www.dorchester-tc.gov.uk/Services/Borough+Gardens

The Borough Gardens is a public open space in Dorchester, in Dorset, England, It was opened in 1896, and is listed Grade II in Historic England's Register of Parks and Gardens. The gardens are owned and maintained by Dorchester Town Council.

== History and description ==
The rectangular site, longer from north to south, has an area of 4 hectares (10 acres), and is bounded by Albert Road in the north, by Cornwall Road in the west, in the east by West Walks Road (part of the Town Walks), and in the south by a footpath between Cornwall Road and Bowling Alley Walk.

To create the gardens, Dorchester Corporation in 1895 purchased from the Duchy of Cornwall 4 acres (1.6 ha) of land, which would become the northern part of the Gardens, and purchased from S. R. Harris a house and nursery gardens, which would be the southern part. The park was designed by William Goldring. Existing mature trees were incorporated in the design, and plants were supplied by Veitch Nurseries in Chelsea. There were modifications to the ground level and the creation of curvilinear walks. The planned bandstand and fountain were constructed after the official opening, which took place on 30 July 1896. The first superintendent was Mr Harris, the former owner of the southern part of the site.

=== Features ===
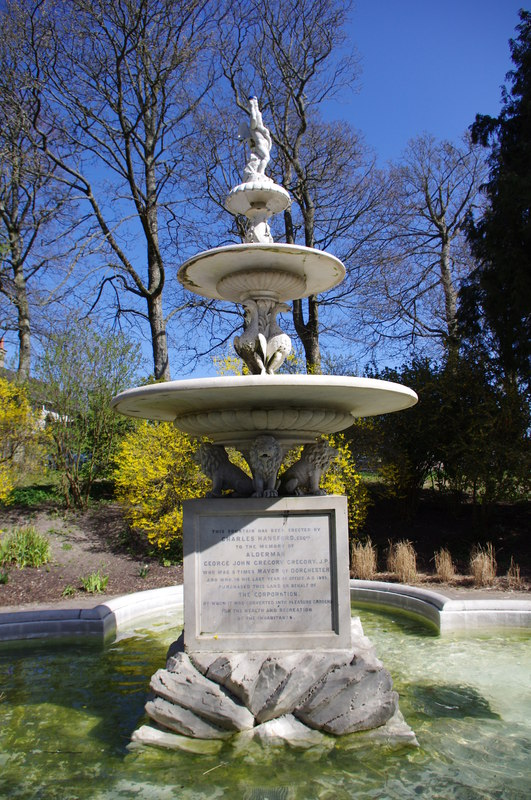
The fountain

The bandstand, designed by the Borough Surveyor G. J. Hunt, celebrating Queen Victoria's Diamond Jubilee, was opened in 1898. It, and its 12 surrounding benches, are listed at Grade II. The fountain, donated in memory of G. J. Gregory, five times Mayor of Dorchester, was opened in that year. The Tirah Memorial, a stone obelisk erected in 1899, is a memorial to men of the 1st Battalion of the Dorset Regiment who had died in the Tirah Campaign of 1897–98 in India. A cast-iron clock tower (now Grade II-listed) was donated in 1905 by Charles Hansford.

In the early 20th century, a bowling green was created in the south of the site, and tennis courts were constructed.

=== Re-opening ===
An opening ceremony again took place (although the gardens were never closed) on 7 May 2007, conducted by Julian Fellowes, on the completion of a restoration and refurbishment project, partly funded by the National Lottery Heritage Fund.

Facilities include a play area, adult fitness equipment, four tennis courts and a community room.
