= Samuel Sebastian Wesley =

English organist and composer (1810–1876)

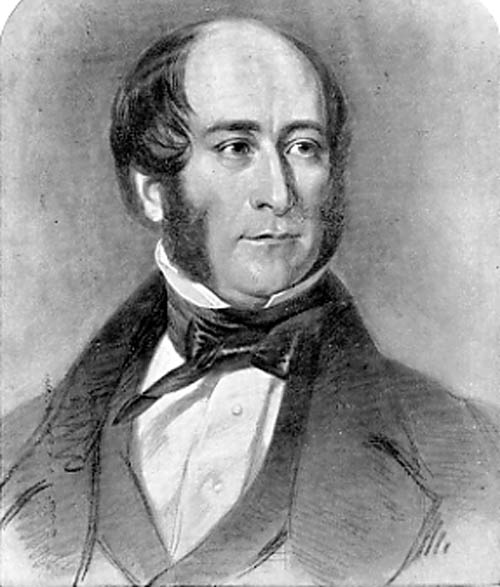
- Born: 14 August 1810; London England
- Died: 19 April 1876 (aged 65)
- Other name: S.S. Wesley
- Occupations: organist and composer
- Spouse: Mary Anne Merewether
- Children: 6
- Parent(s): Samuel Wesley and Sarah Suter

Samuel Sebastian Wesley (14 August 1810 – 19 April 1876) was an English organist and composer. Wesley married Mary Anne Merewether and had six children. He is often referred to as S.S. Wesley to avoid confusion with his father Samuel Wesley.

== Biography ==
Born in London, he was the eldest child in the composer Samuel Wesley's second family, which he formed with Sarah Suter having separated from his wife Charlotte. Samuel Sebastian was the grandson of Charles Wesley. His middle name derived from his father's lifelong admiration for the music of Bach.

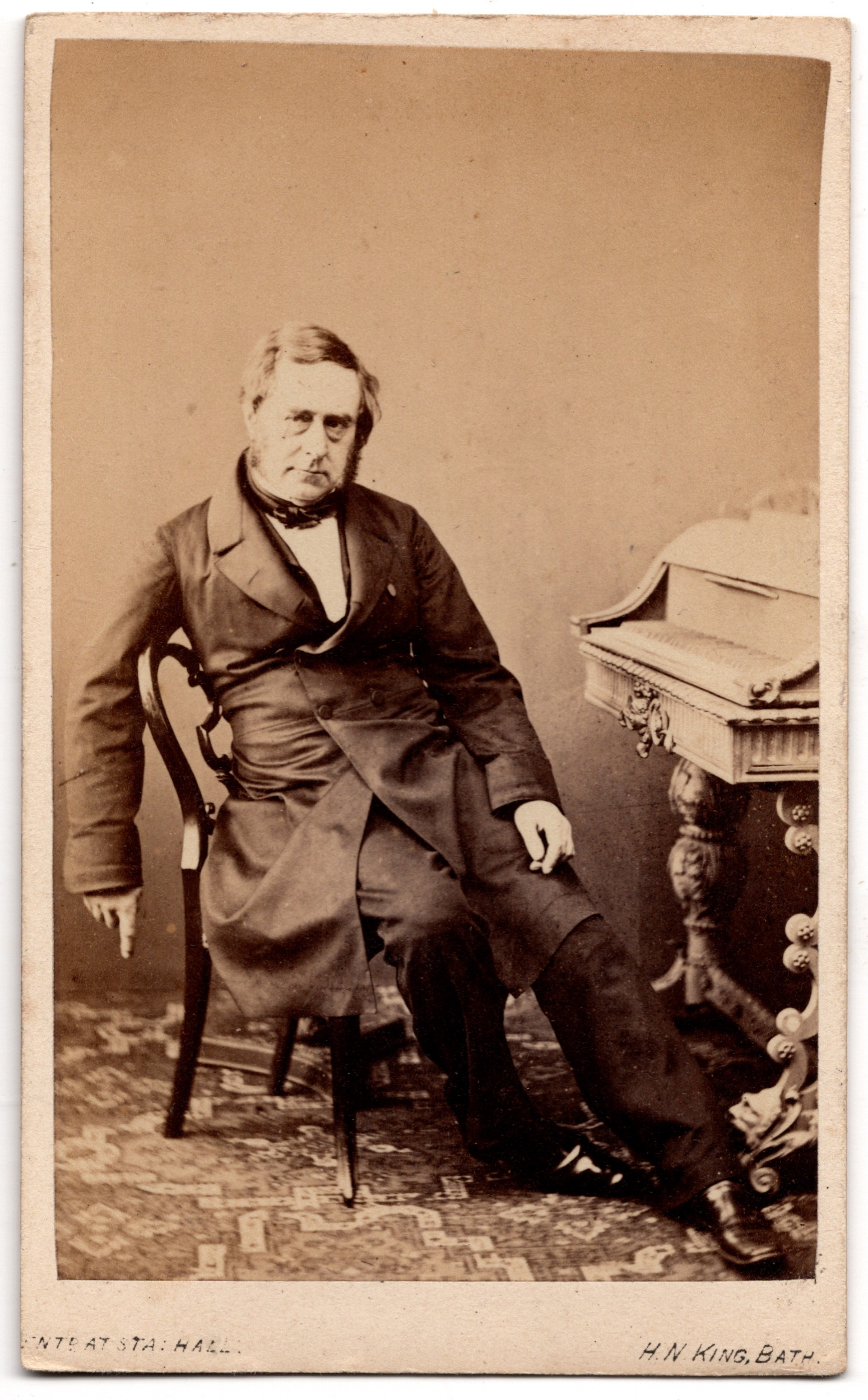
Samuel Sebastian Wesley CDV

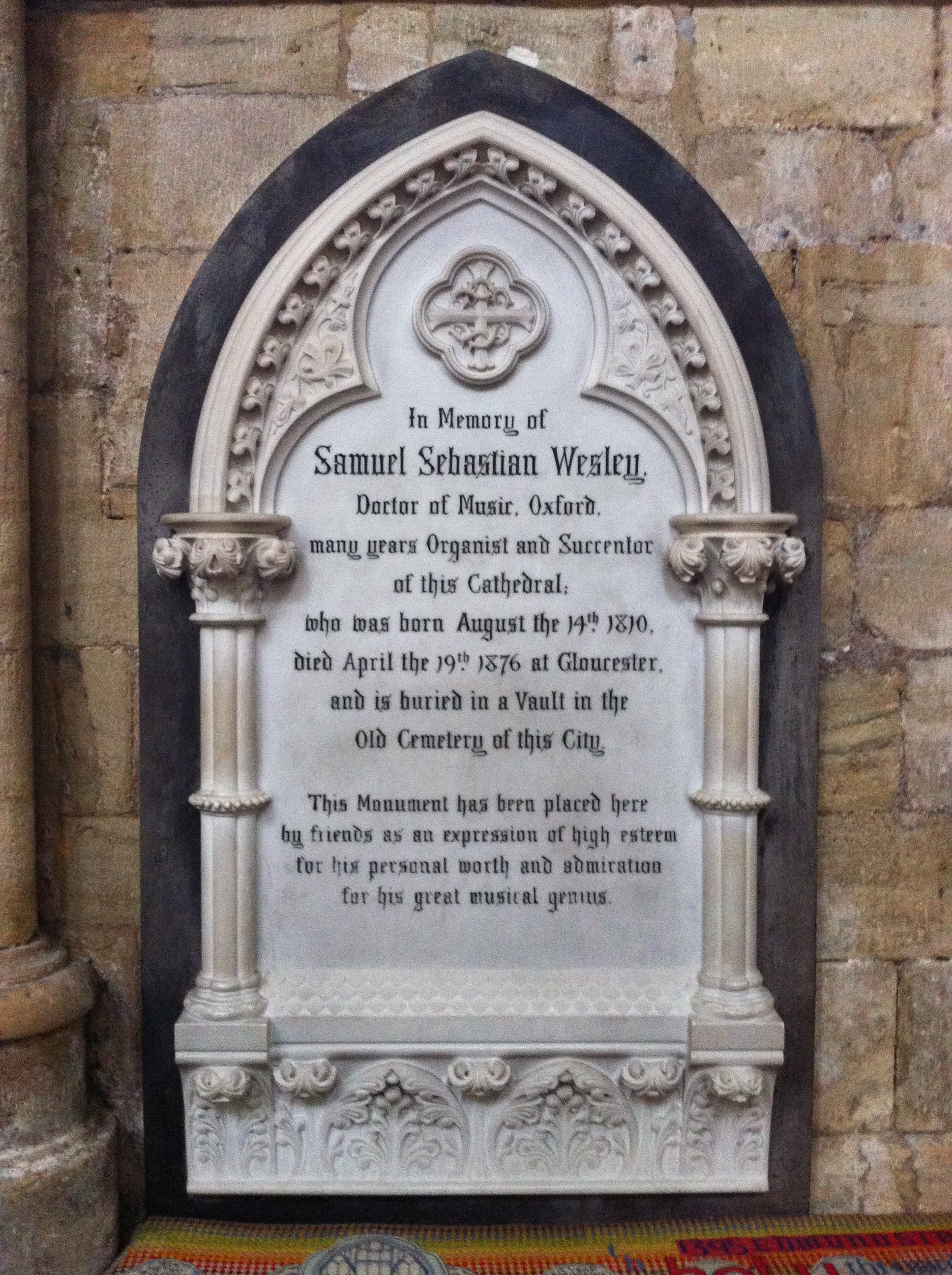
Memorial in Exeter Cathedral

After singing in the choir of the Chapel Royal as a boy, Samuel Sebastian embarked on a career as a musician, and was appointed organist at Hereford Cathedral in 1832. While there he married the sister of the Dean, John Merewether. S.S. Wesley was, like his father Samuel Wesley, a Freemason. He was initiated in Palladian Lodge No.120 in Hereford on 17 September 1833. He moved to Exeter Cathedral three years later, and joined St George's Lodge No.129 Exeter on 10 December 1835. He subsequently held appointments at Leeds Parish Church (now Leeds Minster) (from 1842), Winchester Cathedral (from 1849), Winchester College and Gloucester Cathedral (1865–1876). In 1839 he received both his Bachelor of Music degree and a Doctor of Music degree from Oxford. He became a Professor of Organ at the Royal Academy of Music in 1850. He died at his home in Gloucester on 19 April 1876 aged 65. He is buried next to his daughter in St Bartholomew's Cemetery in Exeter by the old City Wall. There are memorial tablets to him in Exeter Cathedral and Winchester Cathedral, and his memorial at Gloucester Cathedral is in stained glass.

Famous in his lifetime as one of his country's leading organists and choirmasters, he composed almost exclusively for the Church of England, which continues to cherish his memory. His better-known anthems include Thou wilt keep him in perfect peace and Wash me throughly. He also wrote several rather late examples of verse anthems, which contrast unison and contrapuntal sections with smaller, more intimate passages for solo voice or voices. Blessed be the God and Father, The Wilderness and Ascribe unto the Lord are of considerable length, as is his Service in E.

The popular short anthem Lead me, Lord is an extract from Praise the Lord, O my soul.

Of his hymn tunes the best-known are "Aurelia" and "Hereford." "Aurelia" has been widely adopted in the United States, and is regularly heard there. Usually now sung to the words "The Church's One Foundation", Wesley composed the tune for the hymn "Jerusalem the Golden", hence the name "Aurelia".

One notable feature of his career is his aversion to equal temperament, an aversion which he kept for decades after this tuning method had been accepted on the Continent and even in most of England. Such distaste did not stop him from substantial use of chromaticism in several of his published compositions.

While at Winchester Cathedral Wesley was largely responsible for the cathedral's acquisition in 1854 of the Father Willis organ which had been exhibited at The Great Exhibition, 1851. The success of the exhibition organ led directly to the award of the contract to Willis for a 100-stop organ for St George's Hall, Liverpool, built in 1855. Wesley was the consultant for this major and important project, but the organ was, arguably, impaired for some years by Wesley's insistence that it be tuned to unequal temperament.

Wesley, with Father Willis, can be credited with the invention of the concave and radiating organ pedalboard, but demurred when Willis proposed that it should be known as the "Wesley-Willis" pedalboard. However, their joint conception has been largely adopted as an international standard for organs throughout the English-speaking world and those exported elsewhere.

== Musical works ==
Selected works include the following:

=== Anthems ===
- The Wilderness (1832)
- Blessed be the God and Father (1833/34)
- Let us lift up our heart (c. 1836)
- O Lord, thou art my God (c. 1836)
- To my request and earnest cry (c. 1836)
- Wash me throughly (c. 1840)
- Cast me not away (1848)
- The face of the Lord (1848)
- Thou wilt keep him in perfect peace (c. 1850)
- Ascribe unto the Lord (1851)
- I am thine, O save me (1857)
- Praise the Lord, O my soul (1861), includes:
- Lead me, Lord

=== Services ===
- Morning and Evening Service in E (1845)
- Short Full Service in F (c. 1865)

=== Hymn tunes ===
- "Alleluia"
- "Aurelia"
- "Bude"
- "Colchester"
- "Cornwall"
- "Doncaster"
- "Gweedore"
- "Hampton"
- "Harewood"
- "Hereford"
- "Hornsey"
- "Wetherby"
- "Wigan"
- "Winscott"
- "Wrestling Jacob"
- "Bowden" (arranged by Wesley, original composer not known)

Other hymn tunes composed or arranged by Wesley are listed on the Library of Congress Linked Data Service.

=== Organ ===
- "Air on Holsworthy Church Bells"
- Variations and Fugue on "God Save the King" (1831) [in addition to this set of 7 variations in G, he also composed 8 variations in B Flat and 3 variations in D on the same theme]
- Introduction and Fugue in C sharp minor (?1835)
- Larghetto in F minor (c. 1835)
- Three Pieces for a Chamber Organ, book 1 (1842), includes:
- Choral Song and Fugue
- Three Pieces for a Chamber Organ, book 2 (1843), includes:
- Larghetto in F sharp minor

== Literary works ==
- A Few Words on Cathedral Music and the Musical System of the Church, with a Plan of Reform (1849)

== Bicentenary celebrations ==
Celebrations in Leeds for the 200th anniversary of Wesley's birth began with Festal Evensong at Leeds Parish Church on Sunday 4 July 2010 followed by a gala choral recital. Worship on Sunday 15 August was broadcast on BBC Radio Four. Simon Lindley gave a commemorative recital of Wesley's organ music in the evening and a commemorative recital of music by Wesley at Leeds Town Hall on 13 September.

Wesley family tree
The family tree of the Wesleys, founders of Methodism.

Bartholomew Westley b.1596	Anne Colley
? a (daughter of John White)	John; Westley b.1638	Samuel Annesley b.1620
Timothy Wesley (born 1659)	Matthew Wesley	Samuel; Wesley (b.1662)	Susanna; Wesley (b.1669)
Samuel (Sammy); Wesley (b.1690)	Emilia (Emily); Wesley (b.1692)	Mary (Molly); Wesley (b.1696)	Anne; Wesley (b.1702)	Martha; Wesley (b.1706)	Kezia; Wesley (b.1709)
Nine other children (deceased)	Susanna; Wesley (b.1695)	Mehetabel; Wesley (b.1697)	John; Wesley (b.1703)	Mary; Vazeille	Charles; Wesley (b.1707)	Sarah; Gwynne
Seven other children (deceased)	Charles Wesley (b.1757)	Sarah (Sally) Wesley (b.1759)
Charlotte; Louise; Martin	Samuel Wesley (b.1766)	Sarah; Suter
Three children	Samuel Sebastian Wesley (b.1810)

Explanatory notes and reference sources

== Bibliography ==
- "Samuel Sebastian Wesley". Grove Music Online.
- Horton, Peter (2004). Samuel Sebastian Wesley: A Life. Oxford: Oxford University Press. ISBN 978-0-19-816146-2. OCLC 52696622. Archived from the original on 29 September 2007.
- Gilman, D. C.; Peck, H. T.; Colby, F. M., eds. (1905). "Wesley, Samuel Sebastian" . New International Encyclopedia (1st ed.). New York: Dodd, Mead.

Cultural offices
Preceded by John Clarke Whitfield	Organist and Master of the Choristers of Hereford Cathedral; 1832–1835	Succeeded by John Hunt
Preceded by James Paddon	Organist and Master of the Choristers of Exeter Cathedral; 1835–1842	Succeeded by Alfred Angel
Preceded by George Chard	Organist and Master of the Choristers of Winchester Cathedral; 1849–1865	Succeeded by George Arnold
Preceded by John Amott	Organist and Master of the Choristers of Gloucester Cathedral; 1865–1876	Succeeded by Charles Harford Lloyd
