= Haselgrove =

Haselgrove is a surname. Notable people with the surname include:

- C. Brian Haselgrove (1926–1964), English mathematician
- Colin Haselgrove, English archaeologist and academic
- Jenifer Haselgrove (1930–2015), English physicist and computer scientist

== See also ==
- Hazel Grove (disambiguation)
