= Samuel Wesley (composer, born 1766) =

English organist and composer (1776–1837)

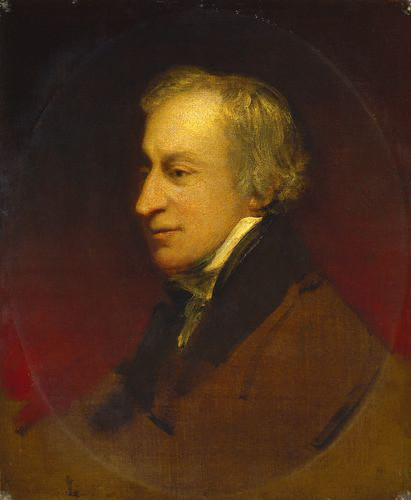
- Born: 24 February 1766; Bristol, England
- Died: 11 October 1837 (aged 71)
- Occupations: Organist, composer
- Children: 7 (including Samuel Sebastian Wesley)
- Parent(s): Charles and Sarah Wesley

Samuel Wesley (24 February 1766 – 11 October 1837) was an English organist and composer in the late Georgian period. Wesley was a contemporary of Mozart (1756–1791) and was called by some "the English Mozart", a title however sometimes also attributed to Thomas Linley the younger.

== Personal life ==
Born on 24 February 1766, in Bristol, he was the son of noted Methodist and hymnodist Charles Wesley, the grandson of Samuel Wesley (a poet of the late Stuart period) and the nephew of John Wesley, the founder of the Methodist Church.

His early musical education mostly took place in the family home in Bristol, where Sarah Wesley, his mother, sang and played the harpsichord. Hymn tunes and the works of Handel were the family's favourite pieces. Samuel also had lessons from David Williams, the organist of All Saints' Church, Bristol. In 1771, his father acquired a second house, in Chesterfield Street, Marylebone, London. Samuel left Bristol for the house in London by 1778.

Samuel informed his mother of his philosophical conviction that his marriage had been constituted by sexual intercourse, precluding any civil or religious ceremony, but after a scandalous delay he married Charlotte Louise Martin in 1793, and they had three children. This marriage broke up with Charlotte's discovery of Samuel's affair with the teenaged domestic servant Sarah Suter. Samuel and Sarah never married but had four children together, among them Samuel Sebastian Wesley (1810–1876) who was a cathedral organist and notable composer.

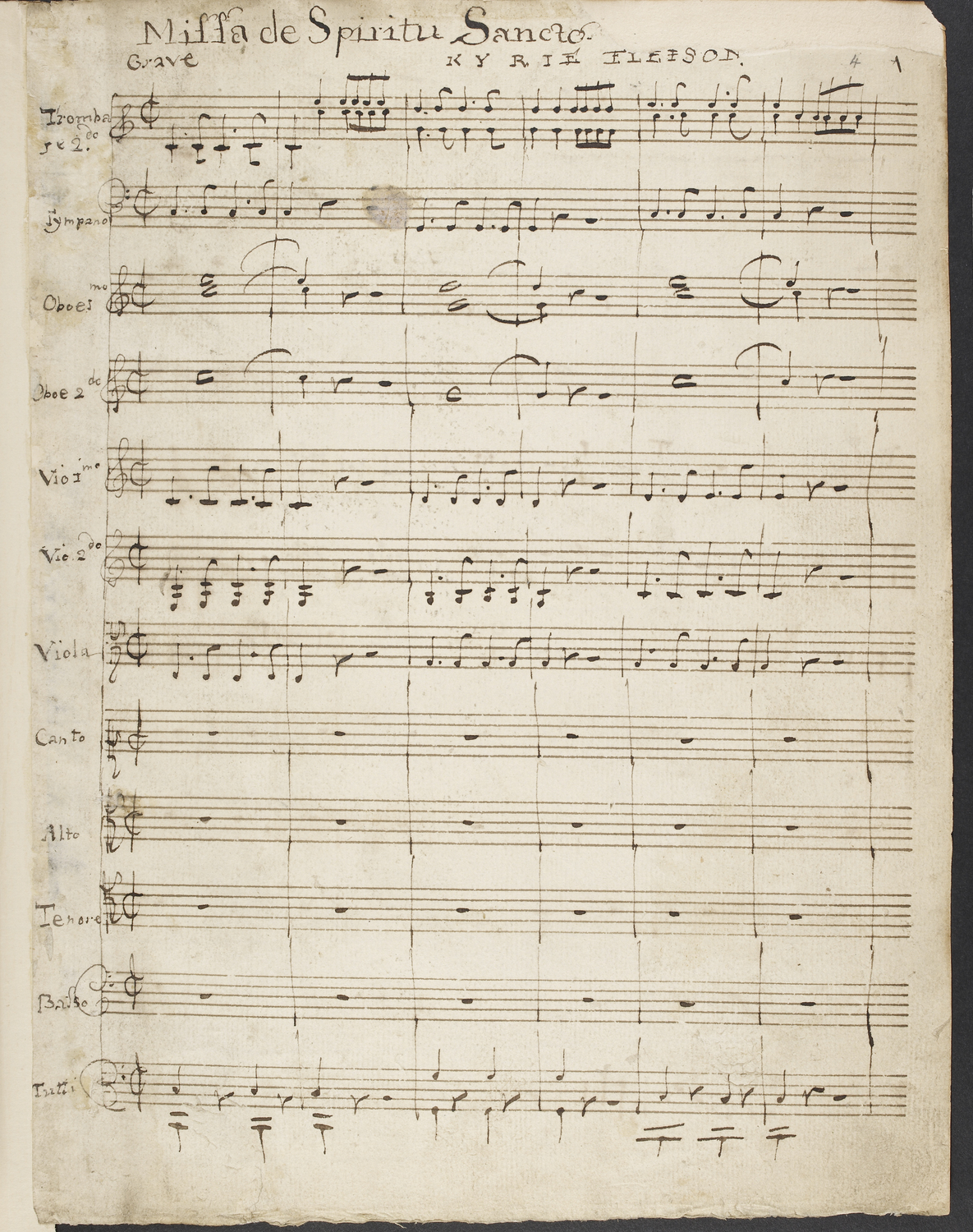
Missa de Spiritu Sancto, in Wesley's hand

In 1784, Wesley privately converted to Roman Catholicism, to the dismay of his uncle John Wesley. His hymnodist father expressed his opinion in the following words:

While ready and resolved is he to plunge into the dark abyss
And cast his soul away
That poison of the Romish sect
O let not his soul infect

To celebrate his conversion, Samuel composed an elaborate Mass, the Missa de Spiritu Sancto, dedicating it to Pope Pius VI. His conversion was short-lived, as Wesley converted back to Anglicanism a few years later. He nonetheless retained a great appreciation for Roman Catholic church music.

In 1788, Wesley was initiated into Freemasonry in the Lodge of Antiquity, London. The Duke of Sussex appointed him Grand Organist of the Premier Grand Lodge of England in 1812, and he continued in office through the process of Masonic unification in 1813, serving as the first Grand Organist of the United Grand Lodge of England. He served as Grand Organist for five years, standing down in 1818.

Wesley died on 11 October 1837, aged 71, and was buried in St Marylebone Parish Church, an Anglican church in London.

== Career ==
Samuel showed his musical talent early in life. As a boy, he was recognised as a child prodigy by the British musical establishment, along with his elder brother, Charles. He quickly mastered the violin, harpsichord and organ. By the age of eight, he was becoming known for his composing and improvisational skills. His father, Charles, wrote:

He was full eight years old when Dr Boyce came to see us and accosted me with, 'Sir, I hear you have an English Mozart in your house.' I called Sam to answer for himself. He had by this time scrawled down his Oratorio of Ruth. The Doctor looked it over very carefully and seemed highly pleased with the performance. Some of his words were, 'These airs are some of the prettiest I have seen. This boy writes by nature as true a bass as I can do by rule and study.'

Wesley worked as a conductor as well as a music teacher and lecturer. He seems to have been one of the pioneers of the British organ recital: prior to his time, entertainment was not considered appropriate for a church building. Despite a reputation as the best improviser on the organ in England, he never succeeded in obtaining an organist's post though he applied to the Foundling Hospital both in 1798 and 1813 and to St George's, Hanover Square in 1824. Generally he appeared to be mistrusted by the British establishment, perhaps due to a forthright manner, his marriage arrangements and it is possible to speculate that he was unreliable. From 1815 onwards, he was beset by lack of money and depression. At one stage, he was reduced to asking Vincent Novello for copying work.

His ability on the organ was so highly regarded that he was introduced to, and played for Felix Mendelssohn in September 1837, a month before Wesley's death. Mendelssohn gave a recital at Christ Church Newgate, during which Wesley said to his daughter Eliza, "This is transcendent playing! Do you think I dare venture after this?" It seems that Mendelssohn persuaded the old man, who was by now very frail, to play. Mendelssohn stood by his side while he was playing and complimented him, but Wesley replied "Ah, Sir! you have not heard me play; you should have heard me forty years ago."

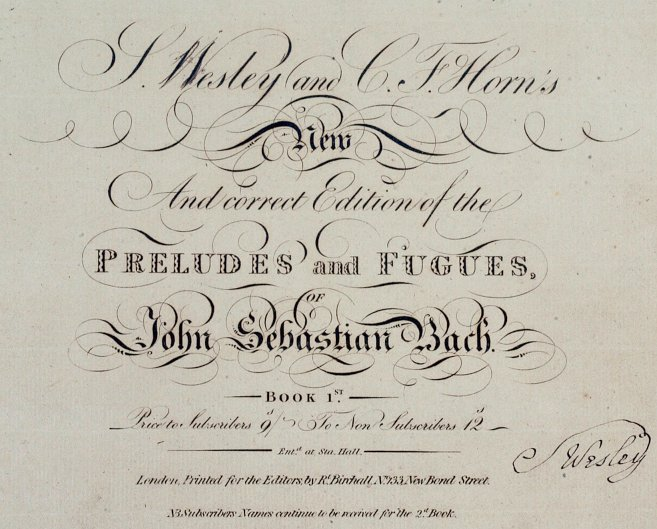
Title page of first English edition of J. S. Bach's The Well-Tempered Clavier, published by Wesley and Horn in 1810

Wesley seems to have become acquainted with the works of Johann Sebastian Bach sometime between 1796 and 1808. In 1810, he and Charles Frederick Horn collaborated in publishing the first English edition of Bach's The Well-Tempered Clavier. Their joint publication and popularisation of Bach's work have been described as an "English Bach awakening". No time was lost in converting others to the Bach cause; Wesley's principal converts were William Crotch and Charles Burney. In a series of letters to his friend, Benjamin Jacob, Wesley documented how he made Bach better appreciated.

== Compositions ==
Francis Routh has compiled a list of all Wesley's keyboard works and hymn tunes, although some further organ pieces have subsequently been discovered. A complete list of Wesley's musical output includes:

- over 120 organ pieces
- 41 Latin motets and the cantata Confiteor tibi Domine
- at least two Masses, the Missa Solemnis and the previously mentioned Missa de Spiritu Sancto, his largest work, scored for solo voices and chorus, with strings, oboes, horns, trumpets and drums
- 6 symphonies and 4 orchestral overture-type works
- 5 organ concertos; 4 violin concertos; 2 harpsichord concertos; 2 string quartets; the Sinfonia Obligatto in D for organ, violin and cello; a quintet for strings, organ and two horns
- at least 65 piano (probably fortepiano) pieces (including many arrangements of popular tunes "as a rondo", e.g. "Jacky Horner", "(Poor) Will Putty", "Widow Waddle", "The deserter's meditations", "Moll Pately", "Kitty alone and I") and over 100 hymn tunes. His rondo arrangement of the Christmas carol "God Rest Ye Merry, Gentlemen" was apparently the first version of the tune to appear in print, before 1815.
- anthems described by Wesley himself in a letter "too numerous to particularize"
- a number of arrangements of work by other composers, including adapting many of Bach's organ works to be played on the less flexible English organ of the day. Many of these were transcribed as organ duets

Many of his best-known compositions were written for the church; they include the motet In exitu Israel. His secular compositions include the five-part madrigal "O sing unto mie roundelaie", entered for the Prize Cup, offered by the Madrigal Society in 1813 and set to the poem by Thomas Chatterton.

However, much of his work was published at the time of composition and then forgotten, and so copies of these works are rare and mostly unavailable in modern performing editions. A considerable body of work exists in manuscript only.

Wesley's compositional style was eclectic, with influences from the late Baroque era, Classicism and, later, early Romanticism.

Wesley family tree
The family tree of the Wesleys, founders of Methodism.

Bartholomew Westley b.1596	Anne Colley
? a (daughter of John White)	John; Westley b.1638	Samuel Annesley b.1620
Timothy Wesley (born 1659)	Matthew Wesley	Samuel; Wesley (b.1662)	Susanna; Wesley (b.1669)
Samuel (Sammy); Wesley (b.1690)	Emilia (Emily); Wesley (b.1692)	Mary (Molly); Wesley (b.1696)	Anne; Wesley (b.1702)	Martha; Wesley (b.1706)	Kezia; Wesley (b.1709)
Nine other children (deceased)	Susanna; Wesley (b.1695)	Mehetabel; Wesley (b.1697)	John; Wesley (b.1703)	Mary; Vazeille	Charles; Wesley (b.1707)	Sarah; Gwynne
Seven other children (deceased)	Charles Wesley (b.1757)	Sarah (Sally) Wesley (b.1759)
Charlotte; Louise; Martin	Samuel Wesley (b.1766)	Sarah; Suter
Three children	Samuel Sebastian Wesley (b.1810)

Explanatory notes and reference sources
