= Peter Wilson (sport shooter) =

English sport shooter (born 1986)

Peter Wilson MBE
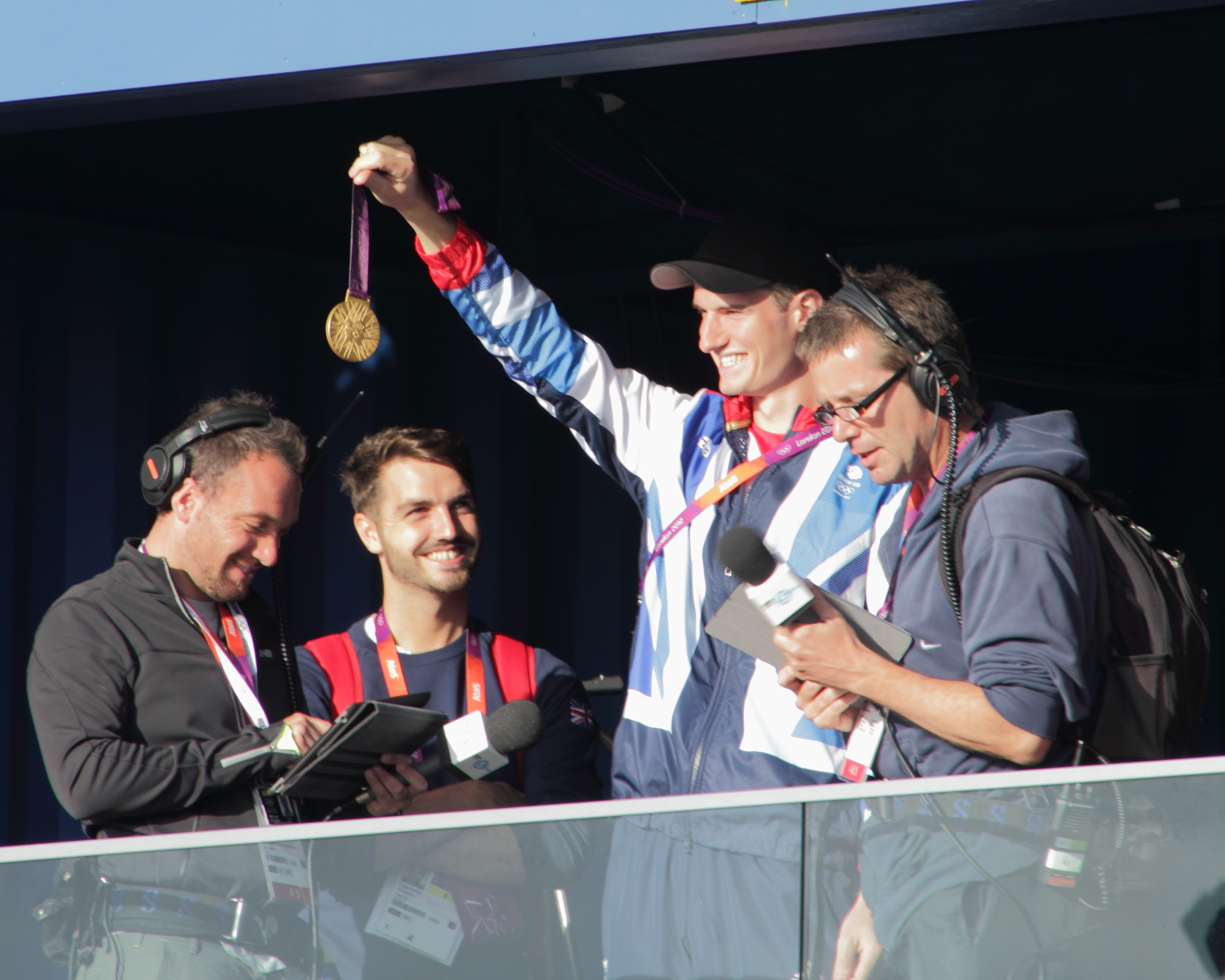
- Wilson showing his 2012 Olympic gold medal

Personal information
- Full name: Peter Robert Russell Wilson
- Nationality: British
- Born: 15 September 1986 (age 39) Dorchester, Dorset, England
- Height: 1.98 m (6 ft 6 in)
- Weight: 90 kg (198 lb)

Sport
- Country: United Kingdom
- Sport: Sport shooting
- Event: Double trap
- Coached by: Ahmad Mohammad Hasher Al Maktoum
- Retired: October 2014

Achievements and titles
- National finals: England
- Highest world ranking: 1
- Personal best: 198
Medal record
Men's shooting
Representing Great Britain
Olympic Games
Gold medal – first place	2012 London	Double trap
European Championship
Silver medal – second place	2011 Belgrade	Team Double trap

Peter Robert Russell Wilson MBE (born 15 September 1986) is a retired English sport shooter who specialises in the double trap. He is the current world record holder for the event, having scored 198 out of 200 at a World Cup event in Arizona during 2012. A member of the British team for the 2012 Summer Olympics, he was the youngest competitor in the men's double trap event, where he won the gold medal.

== Early life ==
Born in Dorset on 15 September 1986, Wilson took up shooting at his father's suggestion, after he suffered nerve damage to his shoulder in a snowboarding accident which left him unable to play squash and cricket.

== Education ==
Wilson was educated at three independent schools: at the pre-prep St. Antony's Leweston Preparatory School in the market town of Sherborne in Dorset, the junior school Hazlegrove Preparatory School in the village of Sparkford, near the town of Yeovil in Somerset, followed by senior school at Millfield School in the town of Street, also in Somerset. He then went to Arts University Bournemouth (formerly Arts Institute at Bournemouth), in the large coastal town of Poole in Dorset, where he studied Graphic Design.

== Career ==
Wilson tried his hand at both skeet and trap but was not enthusiastic enough to train religiously for them. However, after trying double trap, he found a discipline that he was happy to train for every day. Wilson was encouraged by Ian Coley after meeting at the Bisley shooting ground. Soon he was training with shooters such as Richard Faulds and Stevan Walton.

Within four months of trying shooting at the Bisley Ranges, Wilson became the 2006 European Junior Champion at the tournament in Slovenia.

In 2008 he attended the 2008 Summer Olympics as part of Great Britain's Olympic Ambition Programme to expose possible future Olympians to the Olympic experience. He began being coached by Ahmad Mohammad Hasher Al Maktoum, who is a member of the ruling family of Dubai and the 2004 Summer Olympics gold medallist in the double trap. Following budget cuts by UK Sport following the lack of shooting medals at the 2008 Summer Olympics, Wilson's funding was removed completely and he was required to fund his own shooting expenses which amounted to nearly £10,000 a year.

Wilson finished in fourth place at the 2011 European Shooting Championships in Belgrade with a score of 191 in the final. However, the British team came second overall, earning Wilson a silver medal alongside Stevan Walton and Richard Faulds. At a World Cup event held in Tucson, Arizona in 2012, Wilson set a new world record for the double trap. He scored 198 out of a possible 200 in the final, beating the previous record of 196. By winning a silver at the World Cup event in Chile in March 2012, he gained another quota spot for the British team for the 2012 Summer Olympics.

He is a member of the Southern Counties shooting club. Having warmed up at the Royal Artillery Barracks in Woolwich in April in the test event for the Olympic venue. On 28 May, Wilson was named part of the British team at the 2012 Summer Olympics. He won gold, scoring 188 out of a possible 200 hits on 2 August 2012. It was Britain's first Olympic shooting medal since teammate Richard Faulds won the event in the 2000 Sydney Olympics.

Wilson was appointed Member of the Order of the British Empire (MBE) in the 2013 New Year Honours for services to shooting.

Having indicated in 2013 that he was committed to competing at Rio 2016, in October 2014 Wilson officially announced his retirement from competitive shooting to focus on personal life and coaching.

Wilson went on to coach double-trap shooter James Dedman.

== See also ==
- 2012 Olympics gold post boxes in the United Kingdom
