= Hazlegrove Preparatory School =

English private preparatory school

Location
- Hazlegrove; Sparkford, Somerset, BA22 7JA; England
- Coordinates: 51.040253°N 2.5733683°W

Information
- Type: Private preparatory day and boarding
- Motto: Deo Juvante (With God's Help)
- Religious affiliation: Church of England
- Established: 1947
- Founder: Richard Fitzjames
- Senior Warden of Governors: Stephen Edlmann
- Headmaster: Ed Benbow
- Gender: Coeducational
- Age: 2 to 13
- Enrolment: ~380
- Houses: Dover, Lyon, Norton and Tremlett
- Colours: Blue and Gold
- Website: http://www.hazlegrove.co.uk/

Hazlegrove Preparatory School is a non-selective co-educational preparatory school at Sparkford, Somerset in the south west of England. Hazlegrove is part of a foundation which also incorporates King's School, Bruton - a senior school located less than 10 miles away in Bruton.

== History ==
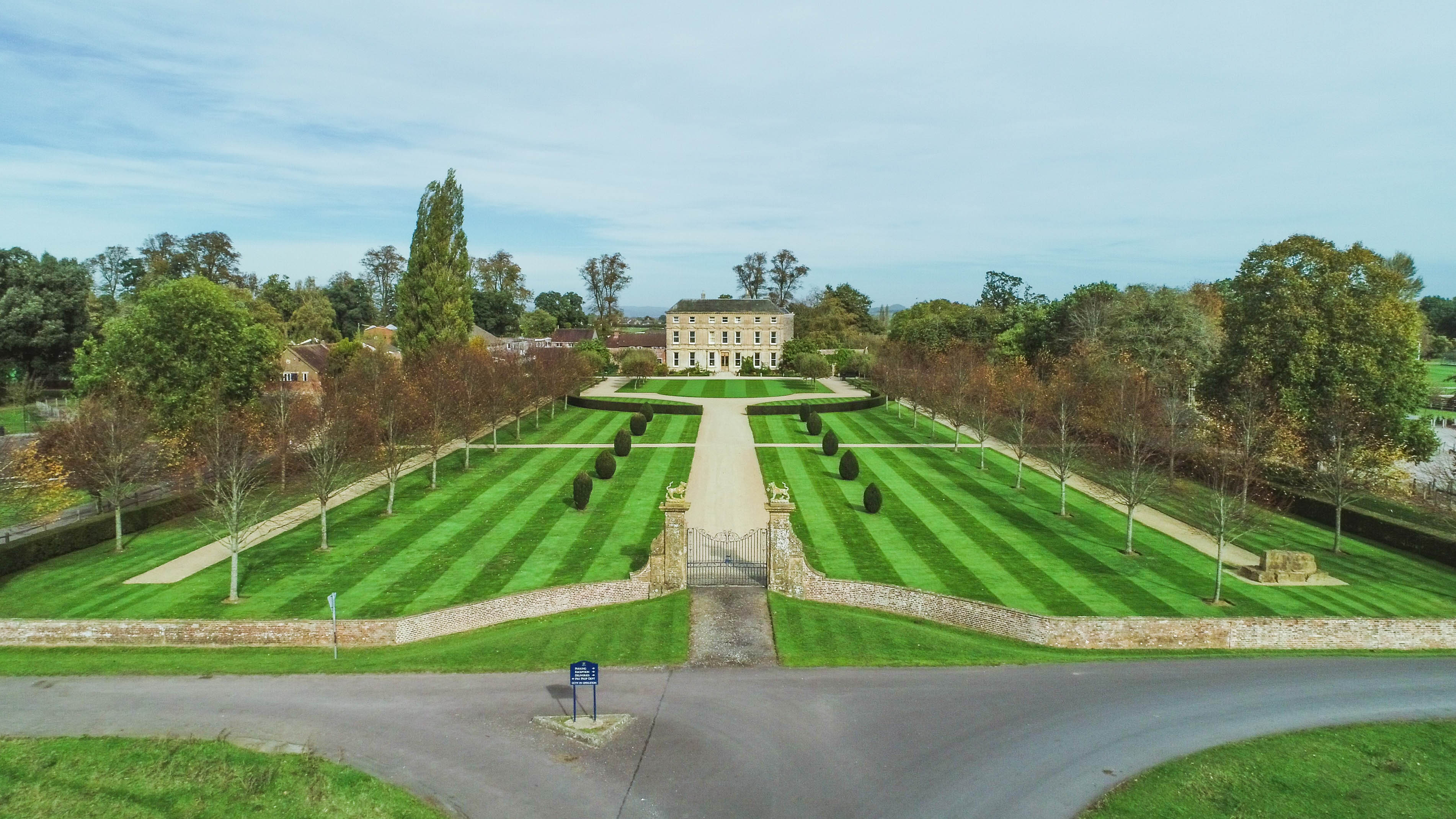

The school is part of a foundation created by Richard Fitzjames (Bishop of London) with his nephew John Fitzjames (later to become Chief Justice of the King's Bench) whose family crest incorporated the bearded dolphin which remains part of the school crest today. After only twenty years of existence, the school was closed with the dissolution of the Monasteries resulting with the surrender of the Abbey including all the endowments of the school to Henry VIII until 1547, and then Edward VI, his son. For ten years the school ceased to exist until a "humble petition" was presented to Edward VI requesting him to restore the endowments of the school. This was granted with the school being called the Free Grammar School of King Edward the Sixth. This Royal Foundation led to a crown being placed above the dolphin on the school crest. The original endowments of the school were re-granted to a Corporation that was to consist of twelve governors. This may be the first school to have a Governing Body with an unbroken record of the proceedings of the meetings of the Governors dating back to 1553.

Hazlegrove Preparatory School was created when the Junior School was moved to Hazlegrove House, after World War II in 1947.

A new building for the school costing £1.6 million, designed by the architects Feilden Fowles, was completed recently, the Fitzjames Building.

== Boarding ==
Approximately 1/3 of pupils aged 7 to 13 board full-time at the school with the majority staying in at weekends.

== Learning support ==
The school has a Council for the Registration of Schools Teaching Dyslexic Pupils accredited Learning Support Unit to help pupils with additional needs (e.g. dyslexia).

== Notable former pupils ==
- Maddie Hinch, English field hockey player
- Tobias Jones, British writer and Journalist
- Peter Wilson, English sport shooter, 2012 Olympic Double Trap Gold Medallist
