= Crowe Hall =

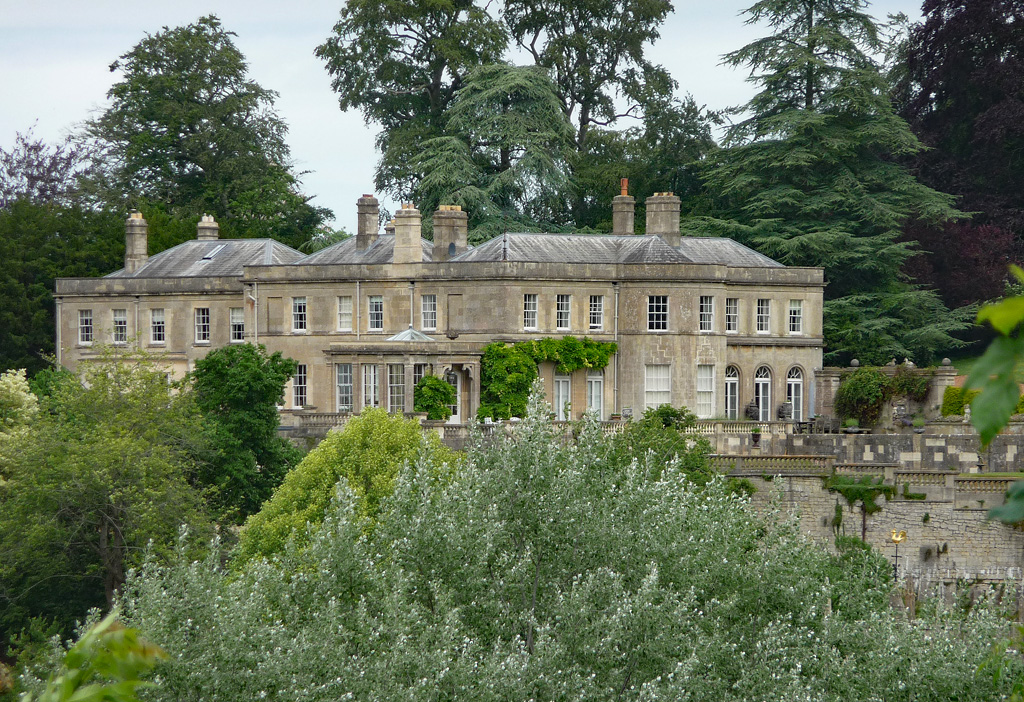
- Crowe Hall from Abbey Cemetery

- Location within Somerset
- 51°22′27″N 2°20′47″W

Listed Building – Grade II
- Official name: Crowe Hall
- Designated: 5 August 1975
- Reference no.: 1395762

Listed Building – Grade II
- Official name: Wall of Crowe Hall
- Designated: 15 October 2010
- Reference no.: 1394685

Listed Building – Grade II
- Official name: Gates and Gate Piers to Crowe Hall
- Designated: 5 August 1975
- Reference no.: 1395763

Listed Building – Grade II
- Official name: Coach house to Crowe Hall
- Designated: 5 August 1975
- Reference no.: 1395764

National Register of Historic Parks and Gardens
- Official name: Crowe Hall
- Type: Grade II
- Designated: 8 August 1991
- Reference no.: 1000548

Crowe Hall is a Georgian house in Widcombe, Bath, Somerset, England. It is a Grade II listed building, and the gardens are on the Register of Historic Parks and Gardens of special historic interest in England.

The house was built around 1760 for a Brigadier Crowe. It has since had a succession of owners who each adapted and renovated the building and grounds. A serious fire in 1926 destroyed much of the fabric and further restoration was required.

The house is surrounded by several hectares of sloping terraced gardens, below Prior Park, which include a rock garden and grotto.

== History ==
The fabric of the current house dates from around 1760 on the site of an earlier building of 1742. A late 18th century sketch by Thomas Robins which is held at the Courtauld Institute of Art shows the house surrounded by informal parkland, in the style of the period. The front of the house was rebuilt in the early 19th century.

The house was built by Brigadier Crowe. From 1805 until 1919 it was owned by the Tugwell family. George Hayward Tugwell, the mayor of Bath, reconstructed the house and laid out the basic framework for a formal terraced garden in around 1810. During the 1870s the house was again remodelled, this time by Henry Tugwell. In 1874, Henry Tugwell appointed William Carmichael (c 1816–1904) as head gardener and he undertook a series alterations to the gardens. Carmichael was trained at the Edinburgh Botanic Gardens, and had been head gardener at Sandringham House, Norfolk in the 1860s.

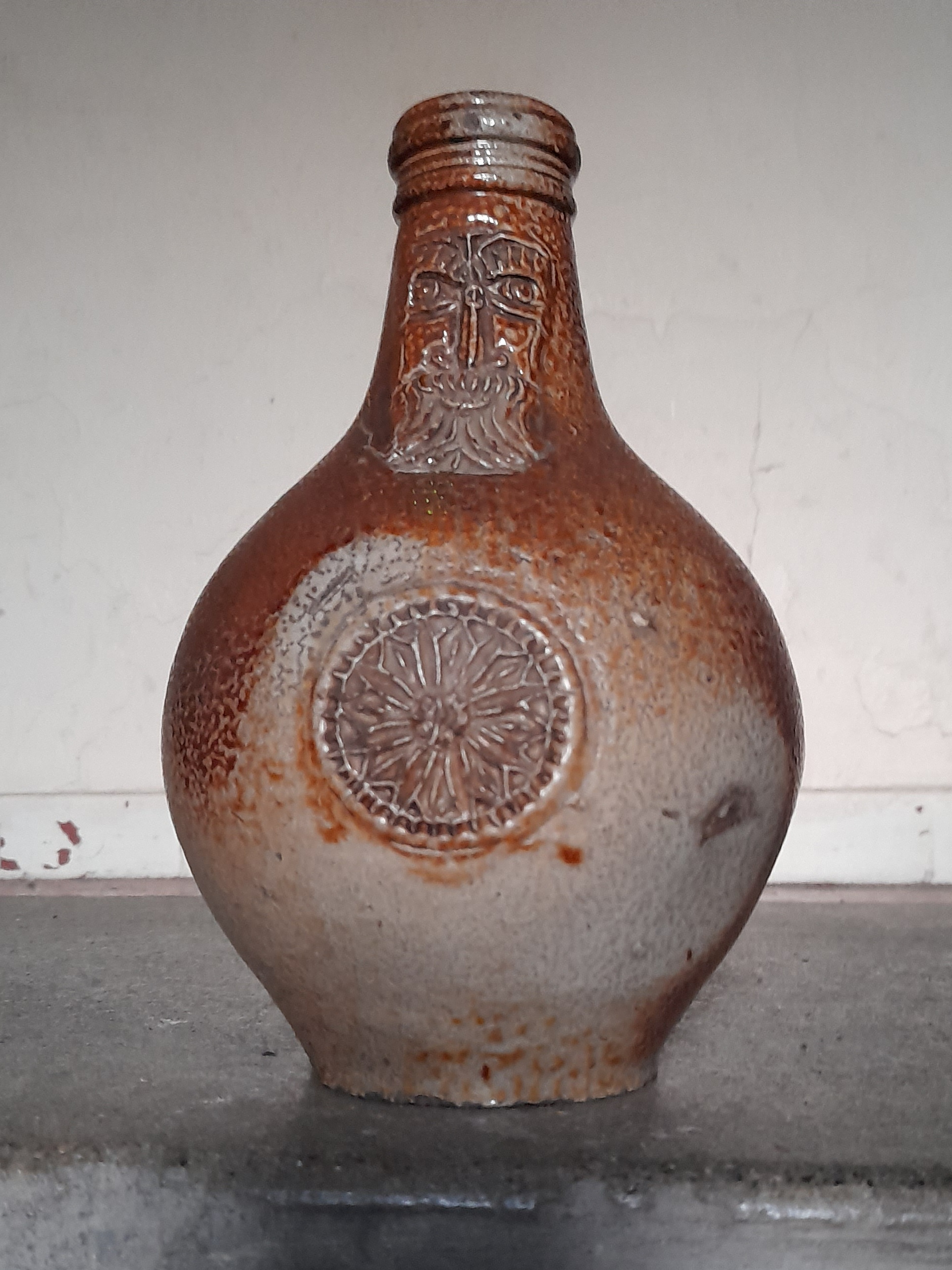
Lot 364, Barratt Collection, Christies, Dec 16. 2010. C17th German Rhine-ware saltglaze 'Bartmann' wine bottle, 21cms height.

In 1919 the Tugwell family sold the house and it was purchased by Major Maconochie who made profit from supplying tinned food as food rations for British soldiers in the field during the Boer War and in front-line trenches during World War I. It changed hands several times afterwards, before being purchased by Sir Sydney Barratt in 1960, who further developed the garden. In 2010 the house was sold at auction by the Barratt family, with the contents including furniture, books and glassware being auctioned separately at Christies in London December 16, 2010 .

In 2019 Crowe Hall was used as a filming location for the 2020 ITV police detective series McDonald & Dodds.

== Architecture ==
The two-storey building, with a basement, has hipped roofs and a porte-cochère. The entrance has four ionic columns.

The west end of the house is an orangery built in the 1880s.

The former coach house is a single-story building with a central elliptical oculus above a pair of arched openings.

The interior was restructured after a major fire in 1926, which completely destroyed the conservatory and much of the back of the house. The work by the architect A. Blomfield Jackson maintained the neo-Georgian appearance.

== Gardens ==
The gardens are Grade II registered on the Register of Historic Parks and Gardens of special historic interest in England. They are laid out in terraces because the 3 hectares (7.4 acres) is over a hillside below Prior Park and giving views over St Thomas à Becket Church and the south of Bath.

The rock garden to the east of the front of the house was laid out in the 19th century by William Carmichael. A statue of Neptune was added later. The Tugwells planted Yew trees and laid out paths as well as constructing large retaining walls. Below the south terrace is a tufa and limestone built grotto which may date from the building of Prior Park in 1742.

The wall surrounding the groups and fronting onto both Church Street and Church Lane is 80 metres (260 ft) long and 2 metres (6 ft 7 in) high is also a listed building, along with the gates and gate piers.
