= Devonport Park =

Public park in Devonport, Plymouth

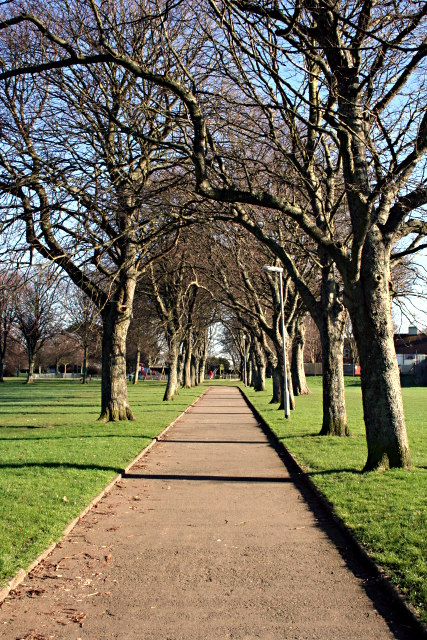

- Location within Plymouth
- Nearest city: Plymouth
- OS grid: SX 45477 55189
- Coordinates: 50.37557°N 4.17240°W
- Owner: Plymouth City Council
- Administrator: Plymouth City Council
- Open: Open all year
- Website: www.plymouth.gov.uk/parksnatureandgreenspaces/findpark/devonportpark

Devonport Park is a public park located in Devonport, Devon, England. The historic park which is now grade II listed, dates back to the 1850s and is situated on former military land. The park is home to many historic monuments including a war memorial to the 2,000 Devonport citizens who died in the First World War. There is a disused railway tunnel underneath the park that used to be the route of the Plymouth, Devonport and South Western Junction Railway.
