= Compton Acres (garden) =

Garden in Poole, Dorset, England

Coordinates: 50°42′26″N 1°55′35″W

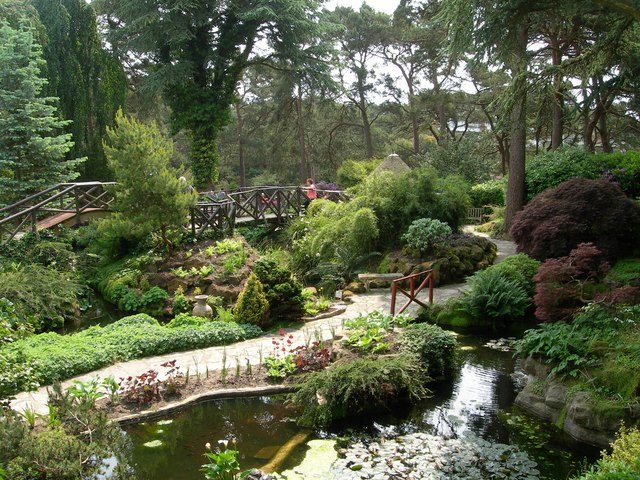
The Water Garden at Compton Acres

Compton Acres is a large privately owned garden in Poole, Dorset, England. It was founded in 1920 by Thomas William Simpson, an entrepreneur who had become wealthy through the manufacture of margarine. The site overlooks Poole Harbour and Brownsea Island.

Compton Acres consists of five themed sub-gardens: an Italian garden, a rock and water garden, a heather garden, a Japanese garden and a less formal woodland garden called the "Wooded Valley".

Since 1986, Compton Acres has been Grade II* listed. The gardens are a popular tourist attraction: its Historic England listing details suggest that the gardens were "probably conceived" with tourism in mind.

== Features ==
=== The Italian Garden ===
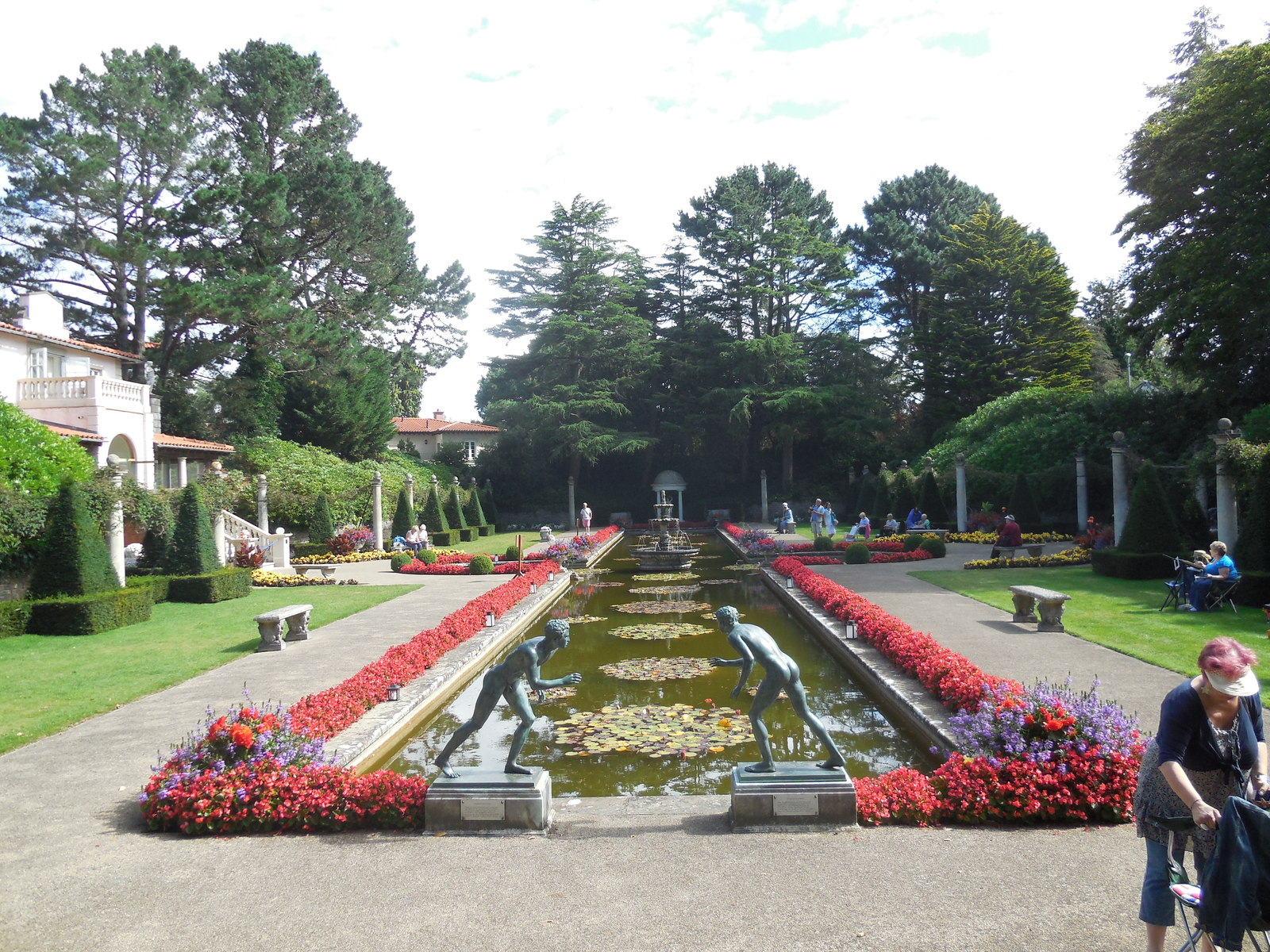
The Italian Garden

This formal garden is designed to be enjoyed as a spectacle with water, fountains, statuary, topiary and mass plantings providing seasonal colour.

To one side the addition of the Villa adds greatly to the Italian sense of place. The garden features fantastic statues such as Bacchus in his Domed Temple, the Wrestlers of Herculaneum and the old Venetian bronze lanterns.

=== The Wooded Valley ===
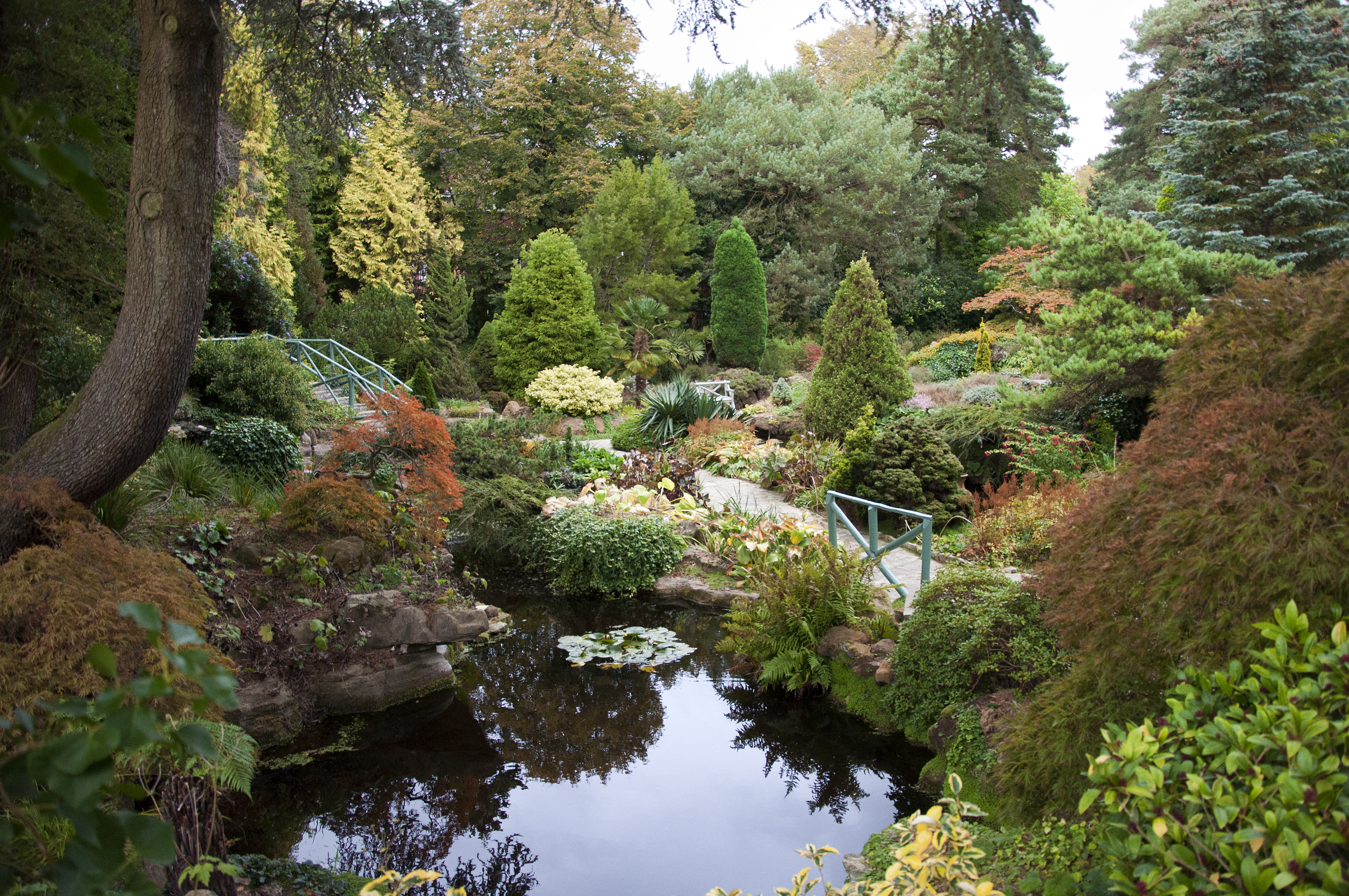
The Wooded Valley

The mature pine wood has been developed as a woodland garden with winding pathways and dramatic waterfalls. Many rhododendrons and camellias thrive here. Shade-tolerant shrubs edge the terraces and glades together with woodlanders, including ferns and foxgloves. On the lower paths a series of pools are cunningly constructed to give the impression of a flowing stream.

=== Rock and Water Garden ===
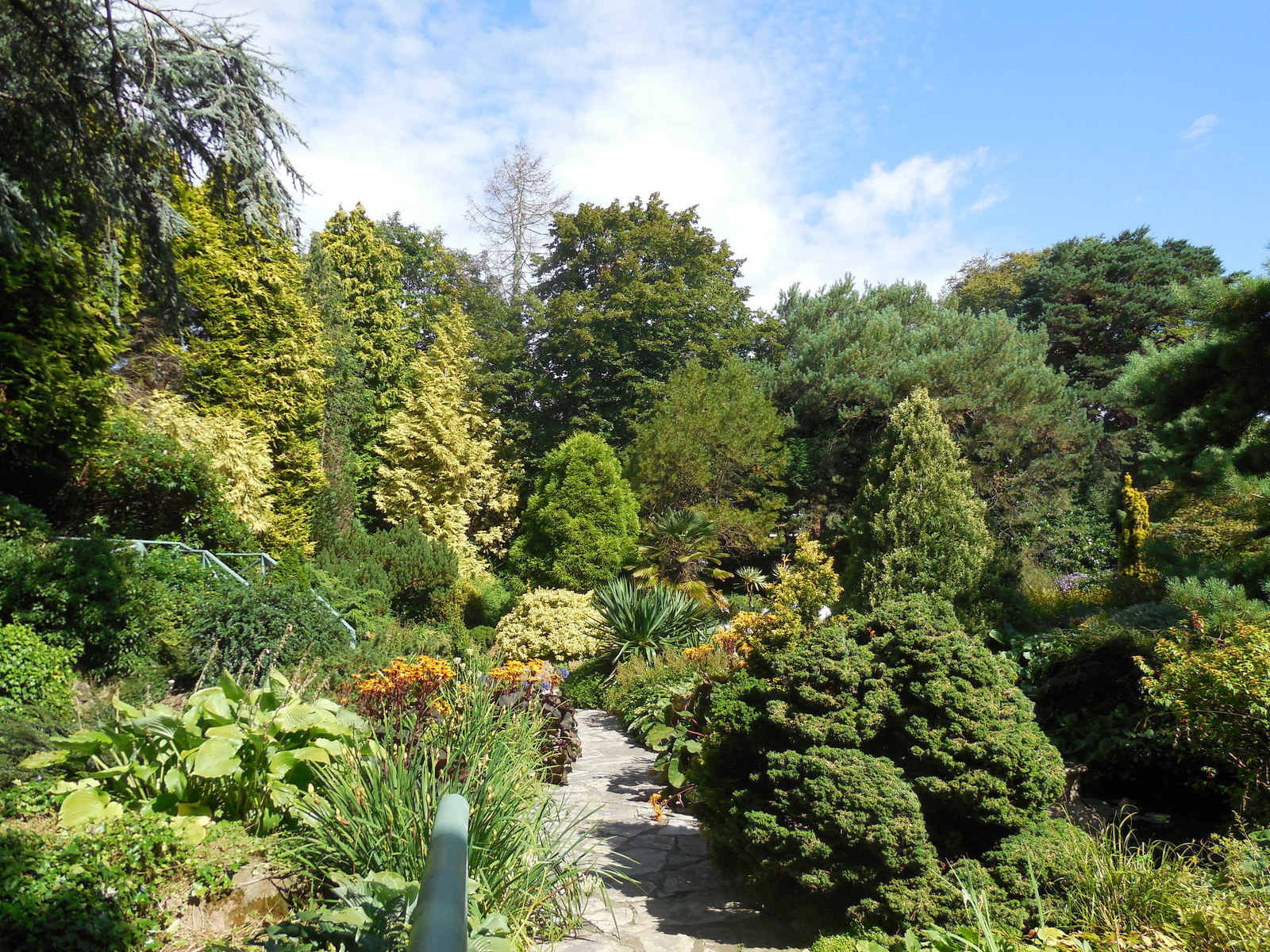
The Rock and Water Garden

This is perhaps the largest rock garden in private ownership in England. It is home to over 300 kinds of plants ranging from mature specimens of slow growing conifers, to a wide variety of "alpines" and hundreds of dwarf spring and summer flowering bulbs.

=== Heather Garden ===
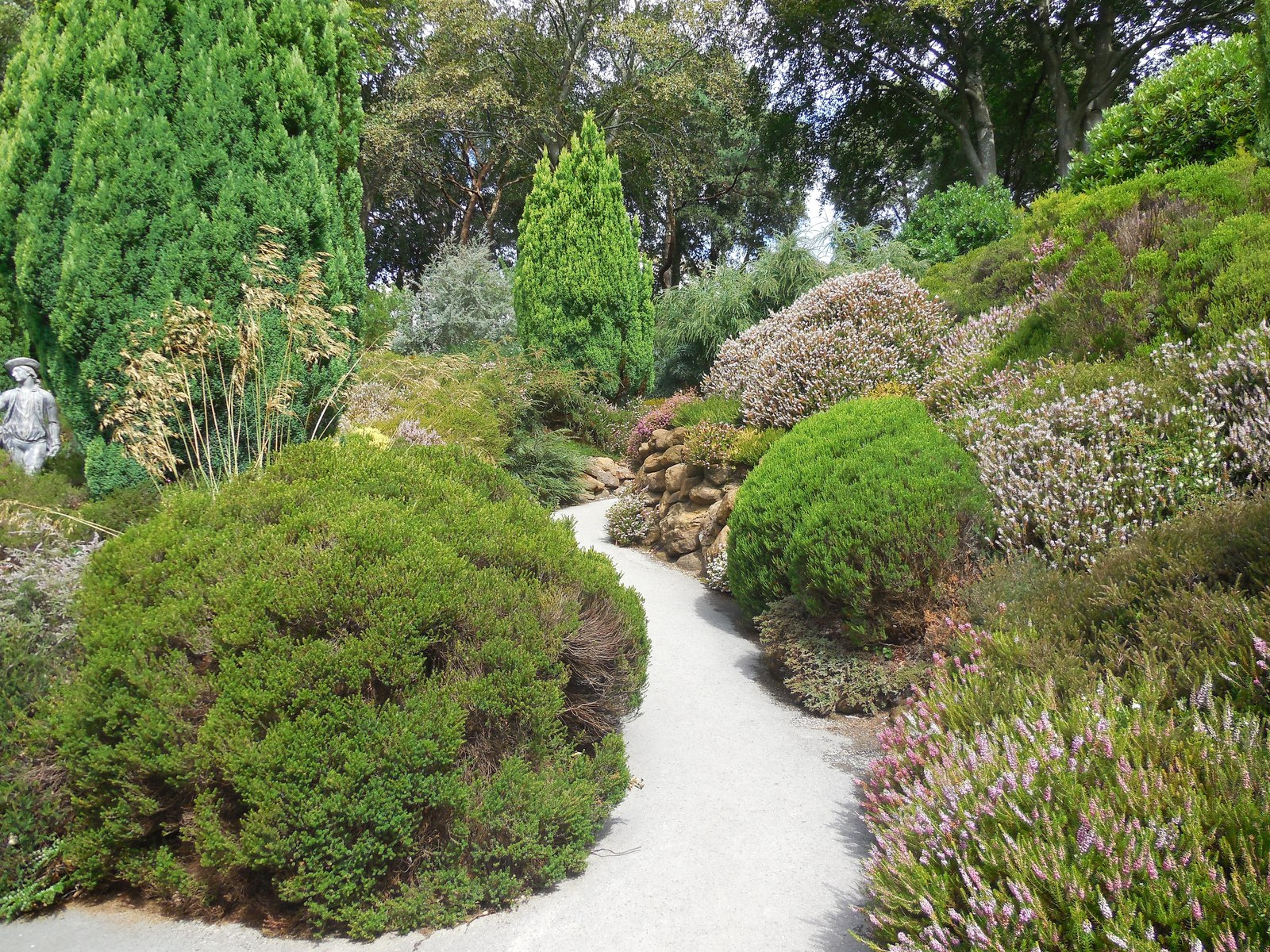
The Heather Garden

This is a year round attraction, at its most colourful in early spring. The plantings are a mixture of many species of heathers. Recent plantings of Southern Hemisphere plants, many not hardy in more inland sites, including the spectacular Acacia pravissima, provide special interest.

=== Japanese Garden ===
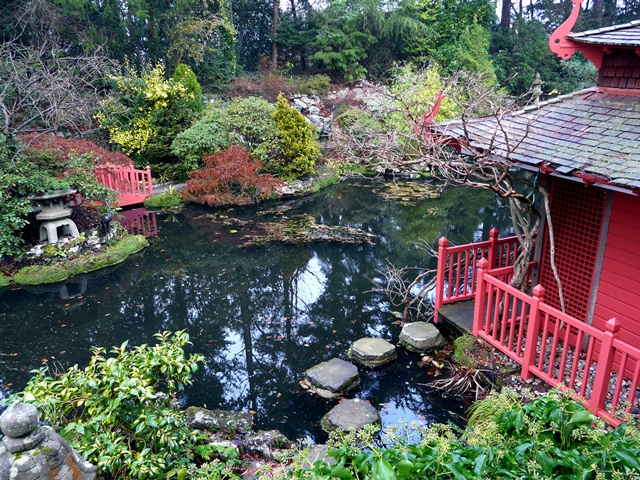
The Japanese Garden

Compton Acres' Japanese Garden is recognised as one of the best in Britain. The Tea House, draped with Japanese wisteria (Wisteria floribunda) and the thatched summerhouse, are constructed to authentic designs while the stone and bronze works of art were imported from Japan in the 1920s. The plants have been chosen with the emphasis on Japanese icons such as the colourful, evergreen Kurume hybrid azaleas, Japanese maples, and beautiful Asiatic flowering shrubs.
