= Milton Lodge =

Country house in Somerset, UK

Milton Lodge and The Combe
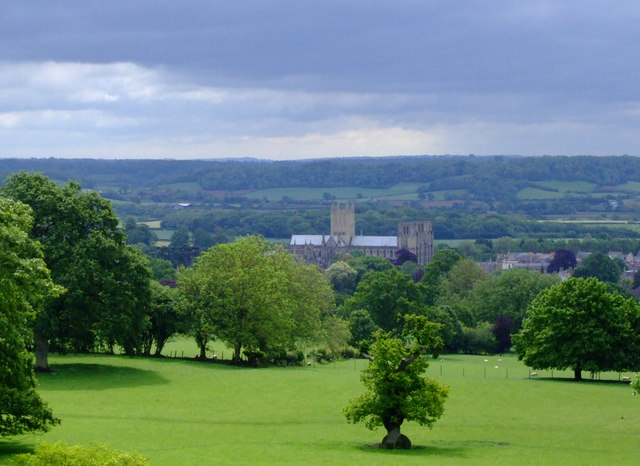
- Wells Cathedral above the parkland at Milton Lodge

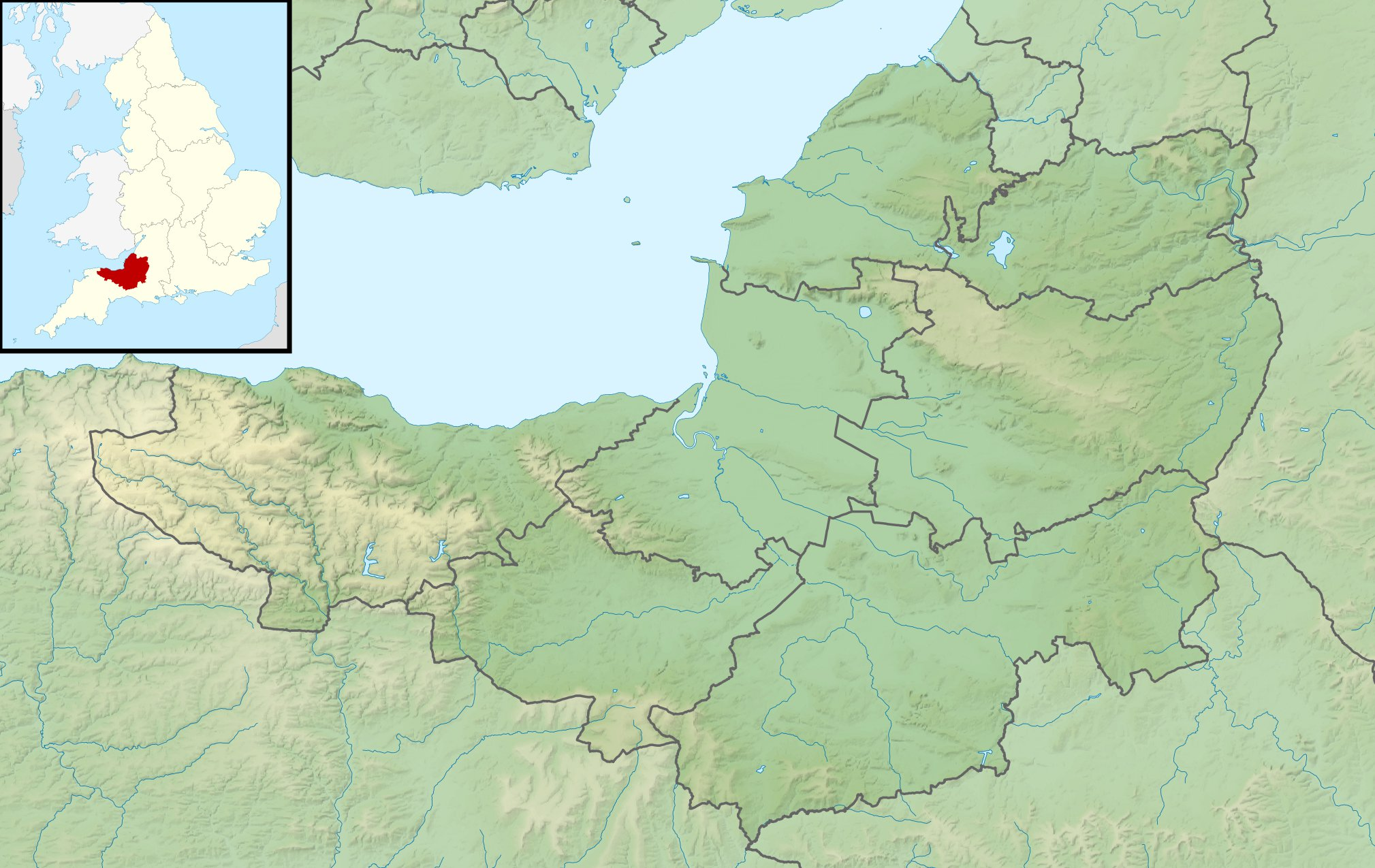
- Location within Somerset
- Location: Somerset, England
- Nearest city: Wells
- Coordinates: 51°13′05″N 2°39′04″W
- Founder: Charles Tudway
- Designer: Capt Croker Ives Partridge of Alfred Parsons
- Open: 14.00-17.00 Tuesday, Wednesday and Sunday during summer.
- Website: www.miltonlodgegardens.co.uk

Milton Lodge is a house and garden overlooking the city of Wells in the English county of Somerset.

The terraced garden, which was laid out in the early 20th century, is listed as Grade II on the Register of Historic Parks and Gardens of special historic interest in England.

== House ==
Milton Lodge was built by Aaron Foster in 1790 and descended in his family until it passed, by marriage, into the ownership of the Tudway family in the mid 19th century. The Tudways had lived nearby at a house, known as The Cedars, which was built in the 1760s by Thomas Paty, and had bought up much of the local land. In 1909 Charles Tudway moved the main family residence to Milton Lodge, with The Cedars being used during World War I as a military hospital and later by Wells Theological College and Wells Cathedral School.

== Garden ==
The garden was laid out in 1903 by Capt Croker Ives Partridge of the Alfred Parsons garden design company for Charles Tudway. It consists of a series of terraces planted with mixed borders including a collection of roses and climbing plants. The terraces include Yew hedges, ponds and fountains. The traditional English vegetation is supplemented with Mediterranean plants which are able to flourish due to the microclimate of the site.

The upper terrace includes four canons from the Napoleonic Wars are on display.

The Combe, which covers 13 acres (5.3 ha), on the opposite side of a small road was planted in the 19th century as an orchard and arboretum.

There is an examples of a tree, known as the dove tree, handkerchief tree, pocket handkerchief tree or ghost tree which was sent from China around 1900 by Father Armand David.
