= Council for the Registration of Schools Teaching Dyslexic Pupils =

British charity

The Council for the Registration of Schools Teaching Dyslexic Pupils (CReSTeD) is a charity which maintains a register of schools for dyslexic children in the United Kingdom. The use of upper and lower case letters for the acronym CReSTeD is an attempt to graphically represent the difficulties a person with dyslexia experiences when trying to read.

== History ==
CResTeD was established as a charity in 1989 by the British Dyslexia Association and the, then, Dyslexia Institute (now Dyslexia Action), with the aim of evaluating schools for teaching dyslexic students and maintaining an up-to-date register of these schools.

== CReSTeD Register ==
To facilitate access to the register of schools, the charity produces the Register in booklet form and makes the information available via the internet on the charity's website. The printed booklet is circulated widely to Local Education Authorities, SNAP (Special Needs and Parents) offices and to other interested bodies. It is also available on request directly from CReSTeD free of charge.

The Register booklet is reprinted once a year. However, the charity's website is maintained throughout the year, and any changes to registration are recorded on an ongoing basis. Schools wishing to maintain their registration re-apply every three years, when a further visit will be undertaken to ensure standards have been maintained. Around 90 schools were listed as registered in 2012.

The Register is also made available in digital formats: ibook, ebook and pdf, the digital versions contain additional material for each school as well as advice regarding Specific Learning Difficulties. All publications are made available free of charge.

Parents in the British Armed Forces whose children have a diagnosis of dyslexia are eligible for a Continuity of Education Allowance if their child attends a CReSTeD-registered school, registered as category DSP (Dyslexia Specialist Provision School), SPS (Specialist Provision School) or DU (Dyslexia Unit).

=== Registration procedure ===
Registration with CReSTeD is voluntary, schools apply to be included. However, there is a strict application procedure:

- The school completes an application form which is submitted: the form is checked to ensure all required documentation has been supplied
- A CReSTeD consultant visits the school to assess the dyslexia provision against published criteria.
- The consultants submit a report, which is approved for content by the school.
- The report is reviewed by a group of peers, who make the final recommendation to the CReSTeD Council as to whether the school should be included within the Register.
- The report is further reviewed by the CReSTeD Council, whose constituent members represent: the British Dyslexia Association, Dyslexia Action, the Dyslexia-SpLD Trust, the Helen Arkell Dyslexia Association, a representative from a private school, a representative from a maintained school and at least one educational psychologist. It is the Council who make the final decision as to whether a school should be included within the Register.

=== Categorisation ===
CReSTeD places schools into several categories. Dyslexia Specialist Provision Schools are schools which focus specifically on teaching dyslexic pupils. Specialist Provision Schools are primarily intended for children with special learning difficulties, including, but not limited to, autistic spectrum disorder. Schools which have a specialist unit on-site devoted to teaching dyslexic students are referred to as Dyslexia Units. Schools without distinct units, but with separate classes for dyslexic students in some or all subjects, are categorized as Specialist Classes. Schools with a Withdrawal System place students in regular classes for some instruction, but dyslexic students are withdrawn from some classes for specialist tuition. Maintained Sector schools have inclusion and support strategies for dyslexic students.

== Funding ==
CReSTeD is a charity registered in England and Wales. It does not receive financial support from central or local government or from any other statutory bodies. All costs associated with the charity are funded by charging schools an annual registration fee of £550 per annum to independent schools and £250 a year to maintained schools. A charge is made to schools for the first registration visit, the cost of subsequent re-registration visits being included within the annual registration fee.
