= St Audries Park =

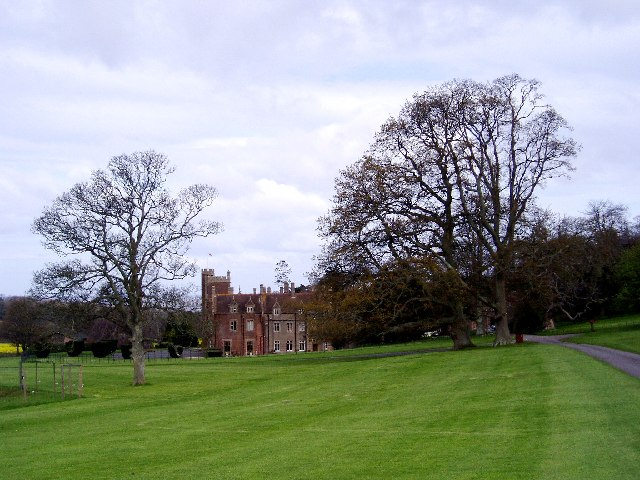
- The house in 2005

- Location within Somerset
- 51°10′25″N 3°16′26″W
- Location: West Quantoxhead, Somerset, England

Listed Building – Grade II
- Designated: 16 November 1984
- Reference no.: 1345730

St Audries Park Manor house at West Quantoxhead in the Quantock Hills of Somerset, England, was the manor house of the Acland family. It was rebuilt on the site of an earlier house, between 1835 and 1870 and has had a number of owners since Sir Alexander sold the building.

The property was divided in 1934, when the house was sold and turned into St Audries School, which remained in occupation until 1990. In 1996 the house was sold to the Amitabha Buddhist Centre.

It was sold again in 2001.

The house and parkland are listed Grade II on the Register of Historic Parks and Gardens of special historic interest in England. They are also on the Heritage at Risk Register.

It is now run as a wedding venue.
