= Queens Park, Swindon =

Park and gardens in Swindon, England

Queen's Park
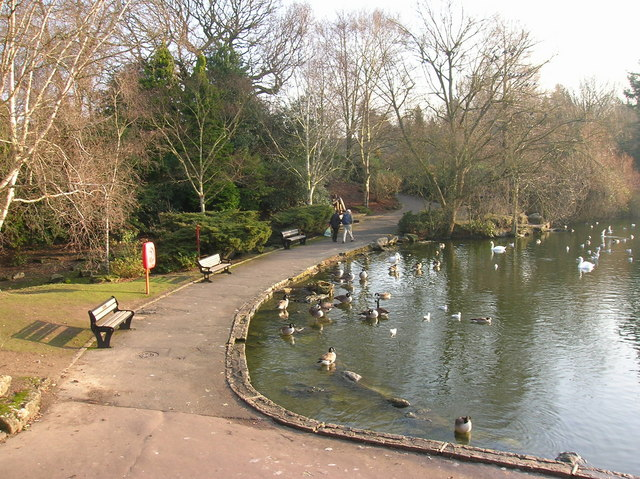
- Queen's Park lake, 29 December 2008

- Shown in Wiltshire
- 51°33′26.19″N 1°46′33.2″W
- Location: Swindon, Wiltshire, England

History
- Built: 1950

Site notes
- Architect(s): J Loring-Morgan and Maurice J Williams
- Website: southswindon-pc.gov.uk/queens-park/

Listed Building – Grade II
- Designated: 8 August 2001
- Reference no.: 1001549

Queen's Park is a public park in the centre of the town of Swindon, England, east of the Regent Circus area. The park is Grade II listed.

The park is owned by Swindon Borough Council. In 2018, the park was transferred to South Swindon Parish Council on a 99-year lease, and the parish council is now responsible for operating and maintaining the park.

It is about 12 acres (49,000 m^{2}) in size, with a lake of around 2 acres (8,100 m^{2}), and contains a diverse range of ornamental trees and shrubs.

The park has a Garden of Remembrance, officially opened by Princess Elizabeth on 15 November 1950, which commemorates those who died in World War II.

Queen's Park is a suitable place for running and other recreational activities.
