= Town Walks, Dorchester =

Site of Roman walls in Dorchester, Dorset, England

Town Walks
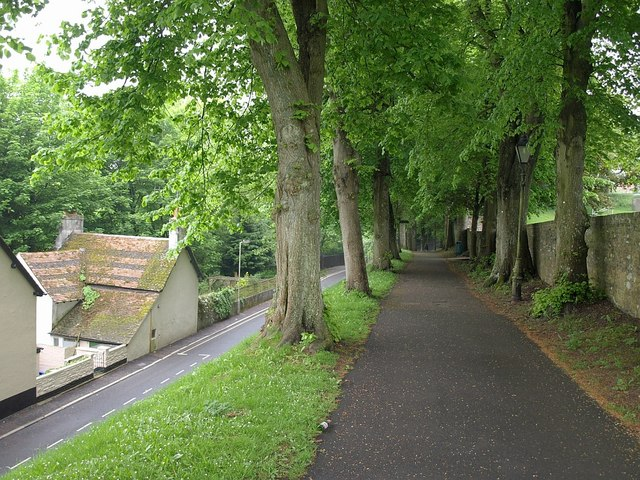
- North Walk

- Location within Dorset
- 50°43′4″N 2°26′31″W
- Location: Dorchester, Dorset
- OS grid reference: SY 689 910

National Register of Historic Parks and Gardens
- Official name: Town Walks, Dorchester
- Type: Grade II
- Designated: 18 February 2002
- Reference no.: 1001594

Scheduled monument
- Official name: Dorchester Roman walls
- Reference no.: 1002449

The Town Walks are a series of public walks in Dorchester, Dorset, England, along the former Roman defences of the town.

== Description ==
=== History ===
The first defences of the Roman town of Durnovaria were an earthen bank and ditch, constructed not earlier than 130 AD. Stone walls were built along the front of the bank at a later time, perhaps in the 4th century. During the medieval period the defences continued to be in use, the ditch being recut in the 14th or 15th century. By the 17th century the walls had mostly disappeared: John Speed's Map of Dorsetshyre, of 1610, showed the defences as "The ruins of the ould wall".

Between 1702 and 1743 the embankments were landscaped to form a series of walks. Hutchins' Map of Dorchester, of 1772, shows tree-lined avenues along the lines of the Roman defences.

=== Today ===
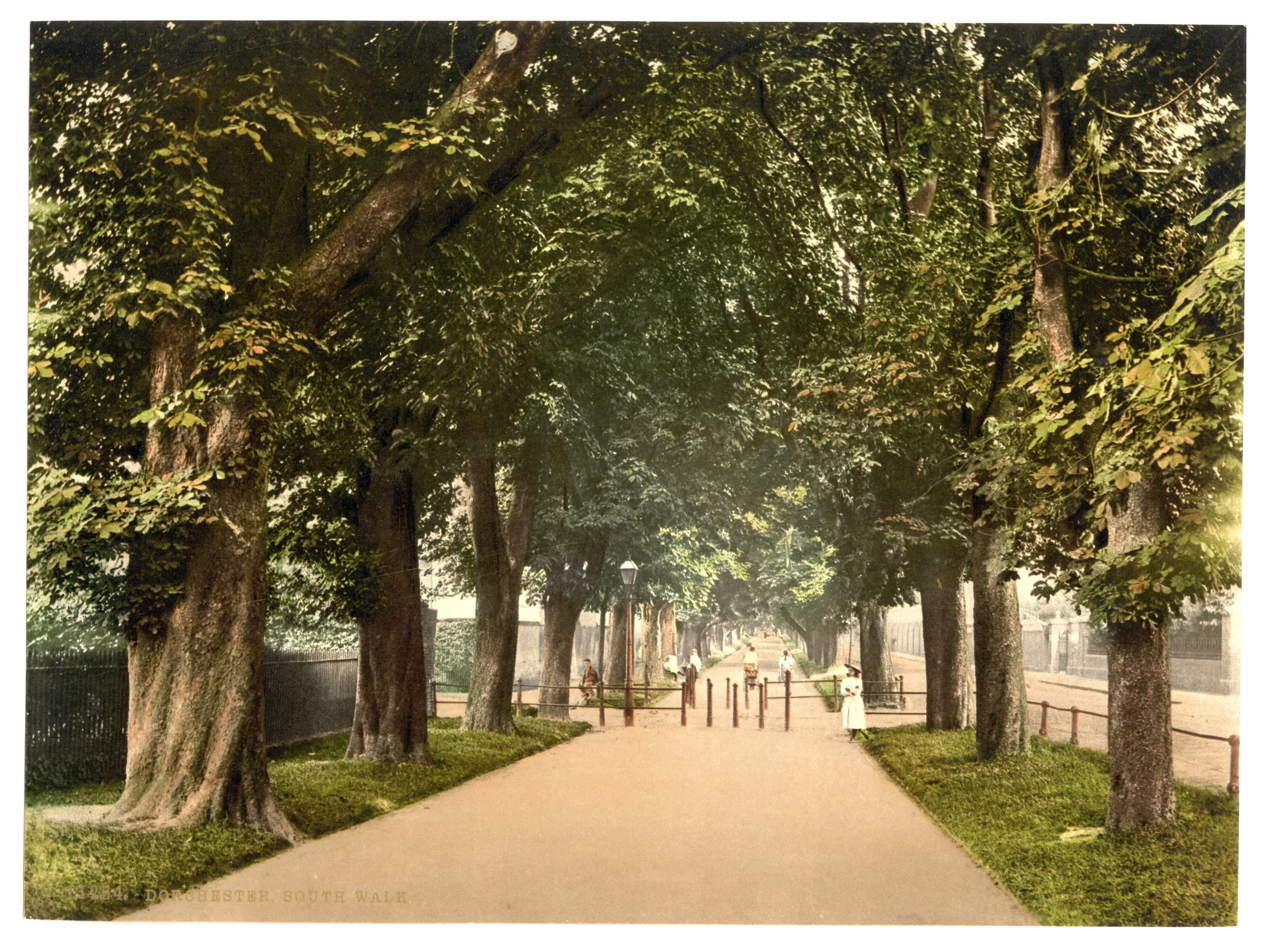
South Walks: Photochrom photograph, c. 1900

The Town Walks are registered at Grade II on the Register of Historic Parks and Gardens; the corresponding Roman walls are a scheduled monument.

The Walks follow the west and south sides, and part of the north and east sides, of the original rectangular defences. There are six tree-lined walks: North Walk and Colliton Walk in the north-west; West Walks and Bowling Alley Walk in the south-west; South Walks and Salisbury Walk in the south-east.

There is a surviving fragment of the Roman wall, on Albert Road near the corner of Princes Street. It is a Grade II listed building. The 18th-century wall beside the Walk round Colliton Park on the line of the Roman defences is also Grade II listed.
