= St Bartholomew's Cemetery, Exeter =

Cemetery in Exeter, Devon, England

St Bartholomew's Cemetery
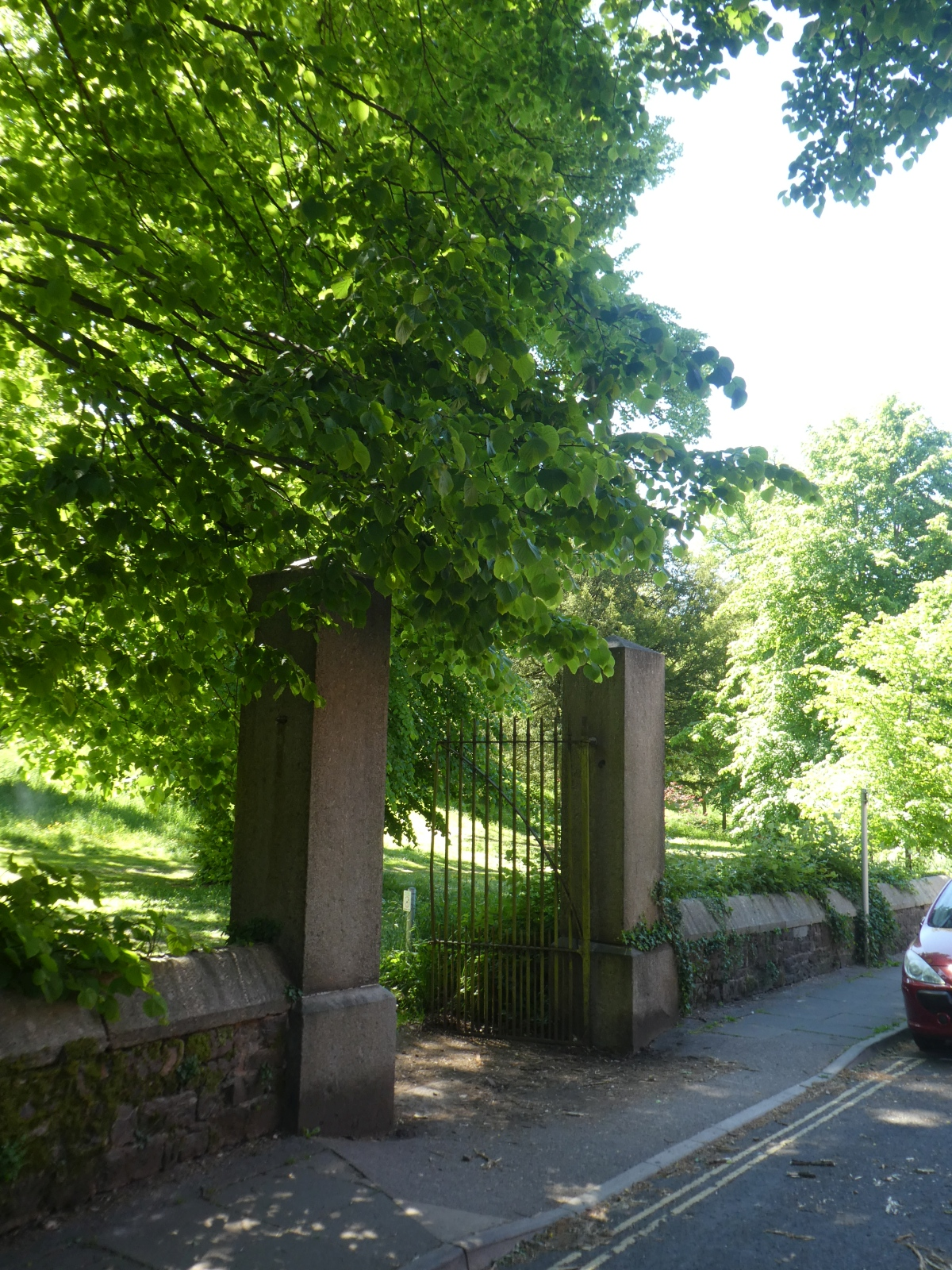
- Interactive map of St Bartholomew's Cemetery

Details
- Established: 1835-7
- Location: Exeter
- Country: England
- Coordinates: 50°43′21″N 3°32′13″W

St Bartholomew's Cemetery is a cemetery in Exeter, Devon. Built in 1835–7, it is thought to be the earliest example in England of a cemetery laid out by a municipal authority or funded from public money. It is Grade II* Listed.

== History ==
Exeter's Cathedral Yard burial ground having become overcrowded, a new cemetery known as Bartholomew Yard was consecrated by Bishop Hall in 1637. By the time of the 1832 cholera epidemic, this new burial ground had in turn become overcrowded. In response, the Exeter Improvement Commissioners asked their Surveyor, Thomas Whitaker, to design a new cemetery immediately north-west of the city walls and Bartholomew Yard. Whitaker's new cemetery was accepted and laid out in 1836–37.

The cemetery remained in use until 1874 when it was closed for new burials. The site remains in municipal ownership as a public open space.

== Exeter Catacombs ==
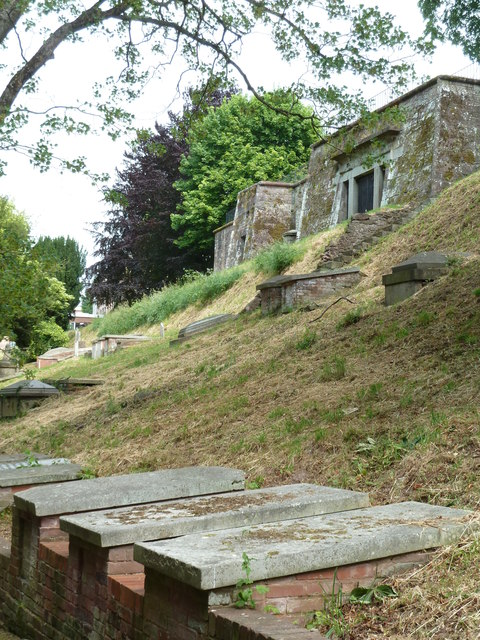
Exeter Catacombs

Whitaker designed the cemetery with a range of catacombs in Egyptian style, designed to receive up to 22,000 bodies. They were built of local stone with grey granite columns. These Egyptian-style catacombs and obelisk gate piers are the earliest known example of cemetery structures (other than monuments) designed in this style in England.

The exterior of the catacombs is composed of a number of symmetrial projecting bays, each with a central monumental entrance surmounted by an Egyptian-style entablature. The entrances are now closed off with massive 20th-century metal gates, but formerly gave access to the several levels of burial chambers within.

The catacombs are also separately Grade II Listed.

Exeter City Council have assigned the catacombs for potential use as a morgue in the event of a major pandemic.
