= Hazlegrove House =

House in Queen Camel, Somerset, England

Coordinates: 51°02′25″N 2°34′24″W

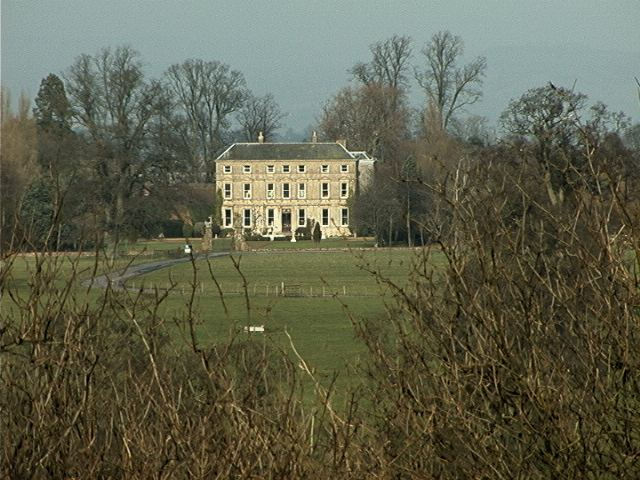
Hazlegrove House

Hazlegrove House is a 17th-century Grade II listed building located in the parish of Queen Camel near Sparkford, Somerset, England. It was largely rebuilt by Carew Mildmay in 1730. After being used as a hospital facility during World War II, the house became the home of Hazlegrove Preparatory School in 1947. The house is set within 200 acres (0.81 km^{2}) of parkland, with direct access to the A303 road.

Due to school sports pitches and other developments, the parkland was threatened with being put on the Heritage at Risk Register. However, this has not yet occurred as of June 2019.

The gardens and parkland are listed as Grade II on the National Register of Historic Parks and Gardens.
