= EWC =

EWC may refer to:

== Educational bodies ==
=== United States ===
- East–West Center, Hawaii
- Eastern Wyoming College, Wyoming
- Edward Waters College, Florida
- Elder Wisdom Circle, California

=== Elsewhere ===
- Education Workforce Council, Wales
- Encounters with Canada, defunct youth program

== Government and law ==
- East–West Center, federally-funded cultural interchange program in Hawaii, U.S.
- Endangering the welfare of a child
- Export Wheat Commission of Australia
- Expropriation without compensation, in South Africa

== Science and technology ==
- Earth Watchers Center, in Iran
- Exchange Web Connect (EWC), a web app

== Sports competitions ==
- Eastern Wisconsin Conference, a high school athletic conference in Wisconsin, United States
- Euro Winners Cup, beach soccer competition
- Esports World Cup, an annual esports tournament in Saudi Arabia
- EWC, a motorcycle racing series also known as FIM Endurance World Championship

== Trade unions and professional bodies ==
- Education Workforce Council, Wales
- European Writers' Council
- European Works Council

== Other uses ==
- European Wax Center, an American chain of hair removal salons
- Evangelical Wesleyan Church, a Methodist denomination
- Express Written Consent, an American talk show
