= Liana Finck =

American cartoonist and author

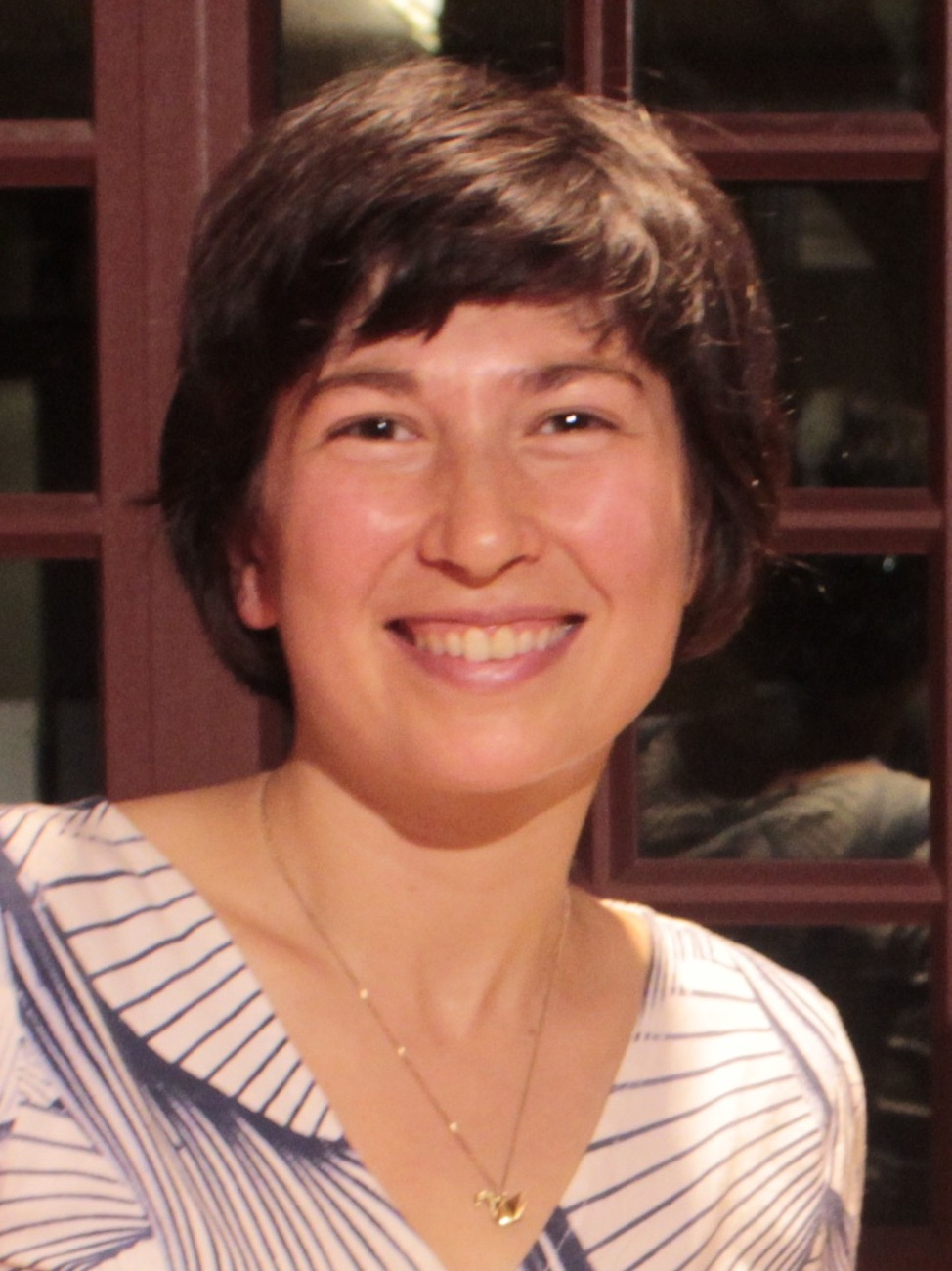
- Finck in 2018
- Born: 1986 (age 39–40)
- Notable works: The Bintel Brief; Passing for Human; Excuse Me: Cartoons, Complaints, and Notes to Self
- Awards: Fulbright Fellowship; New York Foundation for the Arts Fellowship; Six Points Fellowship for Emerging Jewish Artists

Liana Finck (born 1986) is an American cartoonist and author. She is the author of Passing for Human and is a regular contributor to The New Yorker.

== Early life and education ==
Finck grew up in Chester, NY and studied fine art and graphic design at The Cooper Union in New York City, graduating in 2008.

== Career ==
Finck began contributing to The New Yorker in 2015 and maintains a monthly advice column comic called Dear Pepper. She appears in Very Semi-Serious, an HBO documentary about New Yorker cartoonists. The film follows Finck's early meetings with Bob Mankoff, then cartoon editor for The New Yorker, through the triumph of her first sale.

She earned a Fulbright Fellowship to travel to Belgium and research Georges Remi, the cartoonist and creator of Tintin.

She has been an artist-in-residence at the New York Foundation for the Arts, Tablet, MacDowell, Yaddo, and the Lower Manhattan Cultural Center. She has also contributed to The Awl, the New York Times, FT Magazine, The Guardian, Pop-Up Magazine and elsewhere. She had a weekly column in the German magazine, SZ Magazin, from 2020-2025.

She regularly posts her drawings to her Instagram account, which has over 600,000 followers.

She drew the cover of the Ariana Grande and Justin Bieber single Stuck with U.

She received a Guggenheim Fellowship in 2023.

=== Books ===
She received a grant from the Six Points Fellowship for Emerging Jewish Artists, and used the funds to create her first graphic novel, A Bintel Brief, published in 2014. The book is a collection of short stories based on early 20th-century letters written to a Yiddish advice column of the same name.

Her graphic memoir Passing For Human was published in September 2018. Vogue described the book as "a bildungsroman about an artist trying to understand her lifelong compulsion to make art."

She published Excuse Me: Cartoons, Complaints, and Notes to Self, a collection of comics, in September 2019. In April 2022, Finck published Let There Be Light: The Real Story of Her Creation, a graphic novel which reworks the Book of Genesis and features a female God.

Let There Be Light was longlisted for the inaugural Carol Shields Prize for Fiction in 2023, and it won the Edward Lewis Wallant Award in 2023.

In 2024, Finck published How To Baby: A No-Advice-Given Guide to Motherhood, with Drawings, a graphic memoir detailing the experiences of being new to parenthood, as well as You Broke it!, a children's picture book which imagines the relationship between parents and their children through the natural world.

She published her children's picture book, Mixed Feelings in 2025, exploring children's complex emotions that are hard to put into words.

== Personal life ==
Finck is Jewish and lives in New York City.

== Selected works ==
- A Bintel Brief, published by Ecco Press. April 15, 2014. ISBN 9780062291615.
- Passing for Human, published by Penguin Random House. September 18, 2018. ISBN 9780525508922.
- Excuse Me: Cartoons, Complaints, and Notes to Self, published by Penguin Random House. September 24, 2019. ISBN 9781984801517.
- Let There Be Light, published by Penguin Random House. April 12, 2022. ISBN 978-1-9848-0152-4.
- You Broke It, published by Penguin Random House. January 23, 2024. ISBN 978-0-593-66040-9.
- How to Baby: A No-Advice-Given Guide to Motherhood, with drawings, published by Penguin Random House. April 30, 2024. ISBN 978-0-593-59598-5.
- Mixed Feelings, published by Penguin Random House. January 21, 2025. ISBN 978-0-593-66042-3.
- Questions Without Answers, published by Penguin Random House. April 29, 2025. ISBN 978-0-593-73362-2.
