= Dorothy Cameron Disney =

American advice columnist

Dorothy Cameron Disney MacKaye
- Born: November 13, 1903; Oklahoma Territory
- Died: September 5, 1992 (aged 88); Guilford, CT
- Education: several colleges, no degree
- Occupations: Marriage advice columnist mystery novelist and biographer
- Spouse: Milton MacKaye
- Children: William R. MacKaye
- Parent: Loren G. Disney

Dorothy Cameron Disney MacKaye (November 13, 1903 – September 5, 1992) was an American mystery writer and journalist who was born in pre-statehood Oklahoma and died in Guilford, Connecticut.

Under the Dorothy Cameron Disney byline (the name she also used in fiction writing) she was the creator of the modern marriage advice column.

== Marriage advice columnist ==
Her column, "Can This Marriage Be Saved", ran in Ladies' Home Journal for 30 years.

Initially the column was done in partnership with a marriage counseling professional, but later she "made it entirely her own", obtaining source material from "counseling agencies across the country."

In an article for her publisher's 100th anniversary, she wrote that "He (or she) never listens" was "the single greatest pitfall" in marriage. Her column sought to address "the inability of husband and wife to communicate".

== Biography ==
She was born in Oklahoma, then still a territory, to Mr. and Mrs. Loren G. Disney. Her father was a lawyer and an American federal civil servant.

She married Milton MacKaye, a magazine writer. She was known formally afterward as Dorothy Disney MacKaye, but wrote under the name Dorothy Cameron Disney. She and her husband were married for 50 years, until his death. They were survived by their son, William R. MacKaye, their daughter-in-law, Mary Anne MacKaye, and five grandchildren.

=== Earlier career ===
She began her writing career in 1929 with short stories and eventually wrote nine mystery novels. Her novel Death in the Back Seat was reviewed by the New York Times.

Several years later she reviewed a murder mystery for the Times.

==== Transition from fiction ====
During the war years, "she was a war correspondent .. for Reader's Digest."

Her last novel was published in 1949, as she specialized more in her journalistic work. But her works continued to be translated and released in French through 1953, the year when work on her Can This Marriage Be Saved advice column became her focus.

==== Co-publication ====
Together with her husband, she published "The Game of Categories" in 1927.

== See also ==
- A Bintel Brief
- Ian MacKaye (grandson)
- French (Dorothy Cameron Disney) Wiki article
