= Izza (singer) =

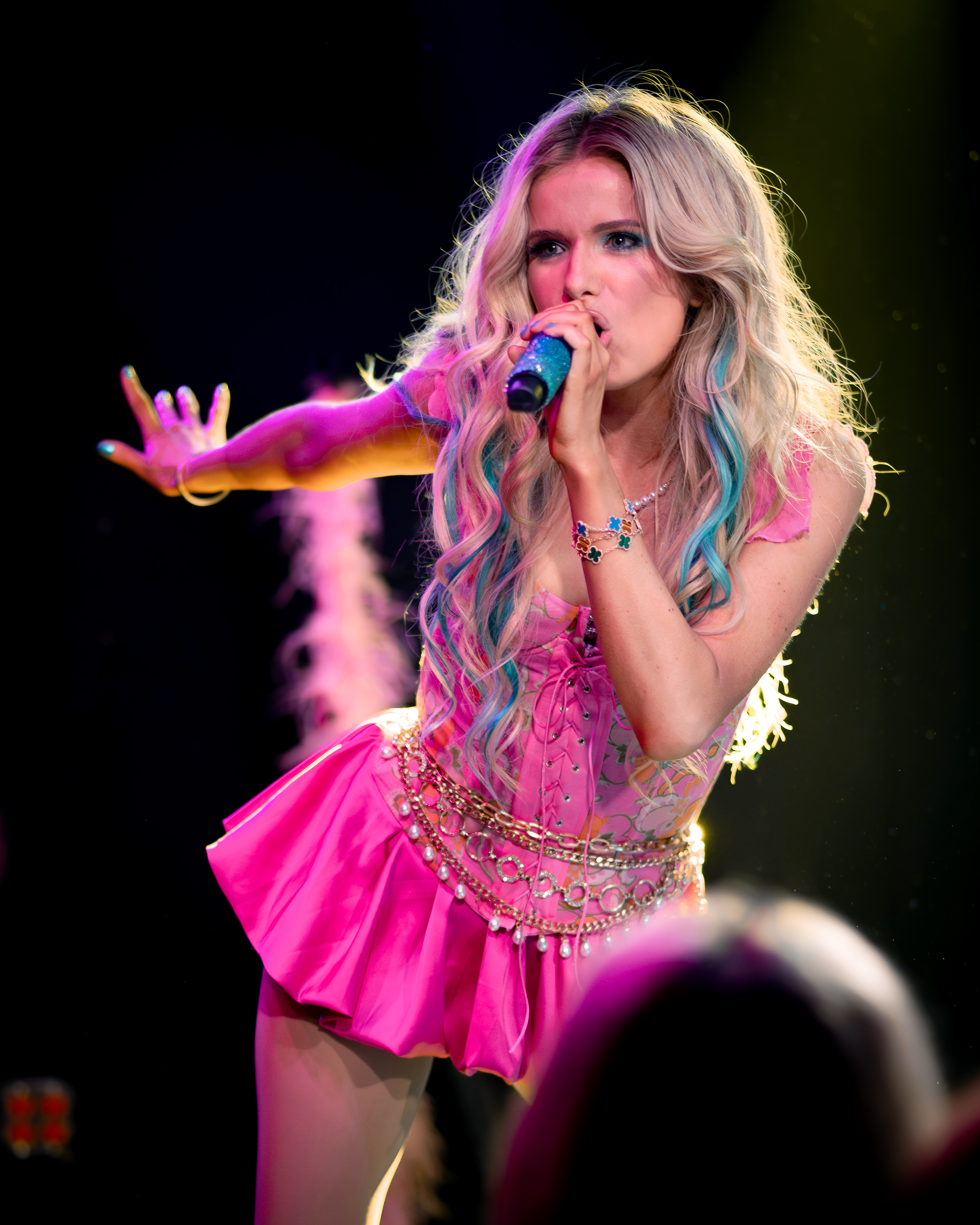
- Izza in 2025

Background information
- Also known as: Izza Roze
- Born: Los Angeles, California, U.S.
- Genres: Electropop; pop rock; pop rap; synth-pop; electronic dance music
- Occupations: Singer; songwriter; producer; internet personality; rapper
- Label: Red Roze Records
- Website: izzaroze.com

Izza Roze, known professionally as Izza, is an American singer-songwriter, rapper, and producer. Her debut EP, I Say This With Love, was released in July 2022. Her second EP, Because I'm Blonde, was released in November 2024.

== Early life and education ==
Izza was born in Los Angeles, California. She grew up in Encino, a neighborhood in the San Fernando Valley. She was introduced to music as a child, and grew up listening to Led Zeppelin and Johnny Cash. She began songwriting at the age of thirteen and played the piano and guitar.

Izza attended New York University's Liberal Studies School before transferring to the University of Southern California to study music business at the USC Thornton School of Music.

== Career ==
Izza joined a rock band as a guitarist, pianist, and singer when she was a teenager. Jay Z and Kanye West's collaborative studio album Watch the Throne was an early inspiration for Izza's music. She has also cited Gwen Stefani, will.i.am, Pharrell Williams, and Fergie as inspirations.

Her early music consisted of electronic dance music and hip hop, and progressed into pop music. She made her professional pop debut in 2020 with the release of her single "405". Later that year she released the single "God of Los Angeles". She performed at 320 Festival, an online mental health music festival, alongside Chris Martin of Coldplay, Kiiara, Elohim, Social House, and Echosmith. Izza founded Red Roze Records, a small music production company that she produces her music through.

In 2021, she released the single "Too Hot", "Crying in Silver Lake" and "LA to JFK". In 2022, she released the singles "Love Bracelets", "Shut Up!", "Nintendo Bitch" and "Popstar".

In 2022, Izza purchased a billboard in Los Angeles to advertise her music. The billboard was reportedly outside the residence of her former boyfriend. She posted a TikTok video of her posing under the billboard with the caption "My ex cheated on me so I got a billboard with my face on it in front of his apartment so him and his new girl can see me every day", which went viral with over 4.3 million views and thousands of comments. Her actions were applauded by major brands including Tinder and European Wax Center. Izza releases samples of her music on TikTok, and used the social media platform to promote her music.

Her debut EP, I Say This With Love, was released in July 2022.

In 2023, Izza released the single "United States of Robbery".

On October 14, 2023, Izza performed at Audacy's 10th Annual We Can Survive music festival at the Prudential Center in Newark, New Jersey. She was the opener for Maroon 5, OneRepublic, Kelly Clarkson, and David Kushner. The concert raised over $600,000 for the American Foundation for Suicide Prevention.

In November 2024, she released an EP titled Because I'm Blonde.

In 2025, Izza released an EP titled Confessions of a Valley Girl. In the same year she was named as an artist to watch for 2026 by Galore Magazine. The article praised her single "Swan Lake" and the EP.

In 2026, she released her EP A Night At The Ballet: Act 1.

== Discography ==
=== EPs ===
- I Say This With Love (2022)
- Because I'm Blonde (2024)
- Confessions of a Valley Girl (2025)
- A Night At The Ballet: Act 1 (2026)

=== Singles ===
Title	Year
"405"	2020
"Too Hot"	2021
"Crying in Silver Lake"	2021
"LA to JFK"	2021
"Love Bracelets"	2022
"Shut Up!"	2022
"Nintendo Bitch"	2022
"Popstar"	2022
"United States of Robbery"	2023
"Swan Lake"	2025
