= Advice column =

Journalism genre

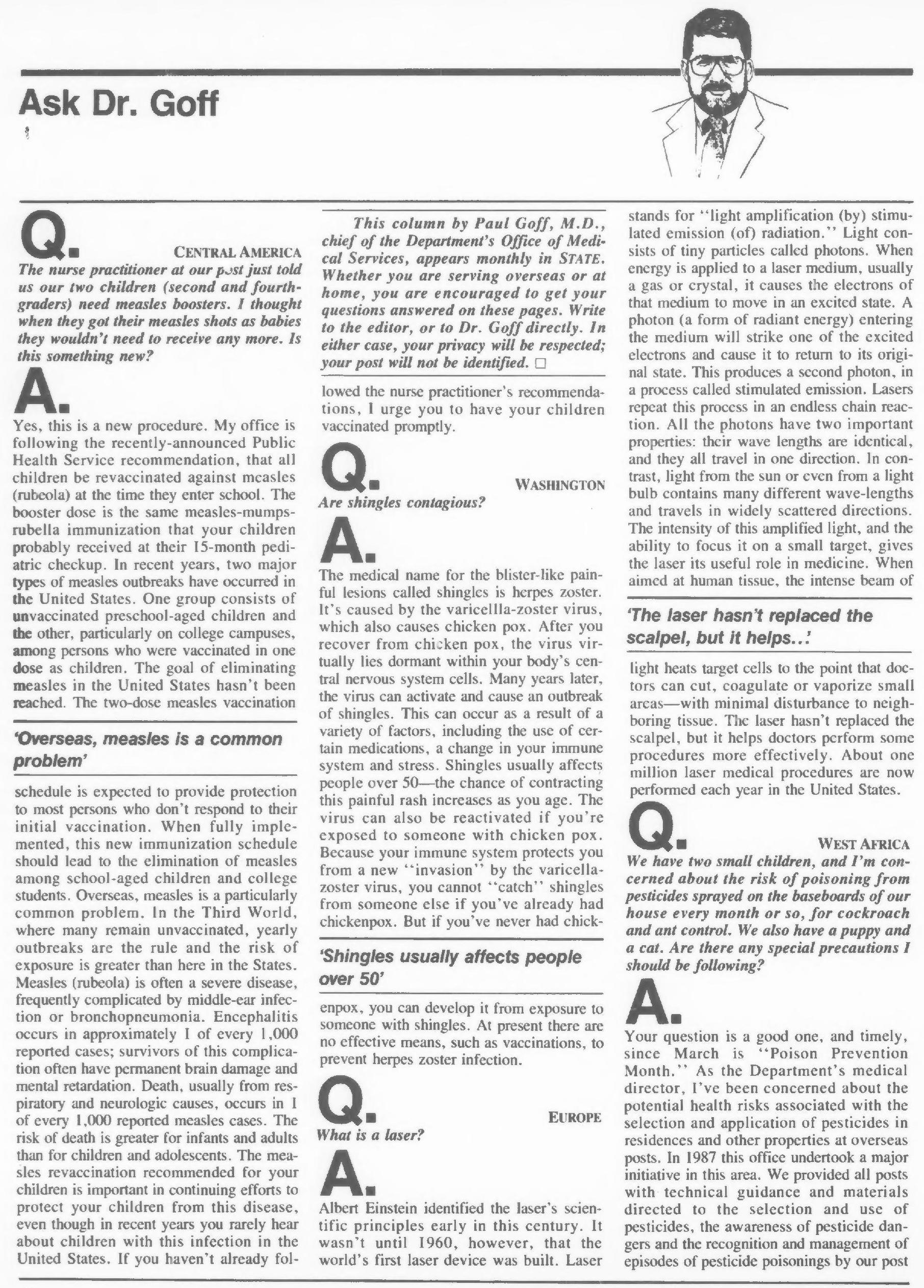
The March 1990 edition of "Ask Dr. Goff", a medical advice column published in State Magazine

An advice column is a column in a question and answer format. A typically anonymous writer sends an inquiry seeking guidance on a situation, and the particular columnist provides a response. Advice column personalities often became closely associated with their specific media outlet.

The genre was popularized on the premise of an older woman dispensing comforting advice and maternal wisdom, hence the colloquial British English agony aunt, and later agony uncle. The nominal writer may be a pseudonym, with any accompanying picture bearing little resemblance to the actual author. Otherwise a team may maintain authorship as a composite, or in effect a brand name: as with the moniker of Marjorie Proops appearing (with photo) long after she retired.

The Athenian Mercury featured the first known advice column in 1690. Traditionally presented in a magazine or newspaper, advice columns have been adapted across broadcast media and internet platforms.

== History ==
The original advice columns of The Athenian Mercury covered a wide scope of information, answering questions on subjects such as science, history, and politics. John Dunton, the bookseller who established The Athenian Mercury, enlisted experts in different fields to assist with the answers. As more people read the columns, questions on relationships increased.

In 1704, Daniel Defoe began a public affairs journal, A Review of the Affairs of France. He used the name of a fictional society, the "Scandalous Club", as the "author" of a lighter section of the Review, and soon readers were sending 40–50 letters a week asking for advice from the Scandalous Club. At one point, Defoe complained of a backlog of 300 unanswered questions. Eventually, he spun off the letters-and-answers into a separate paper called the Little Review.

A few years after the Little Review ended, The British Apollo newspaper provided advice to readers' questions in London. These have been compiled and published as The British Apollo: containing two thousand answers to curious questions in most arts and sciences, serious, comical, and humorous, approved of by many of the most learned and ingenious of both universities, and of the Royal-Society.

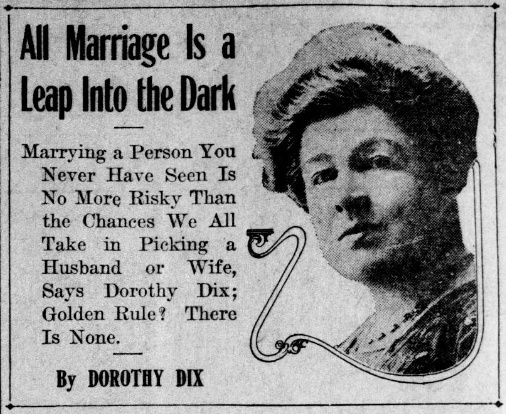
Dix column, 1913

Della Manley, the first recorded woman editor in Britain, began a gossip sheet in 1709, the Female Tattler, which included advice to readers, making her the first Agony Aunt. Her advice column approach was soon mimicked in the Female Spectator, a women's magazine launched by Eliza Haywood.

As Silence Dogood and other characters, Benjamin Franklin offered advice in the New England Courant and later in the Pennsylvania Gazette. The columnist Dorothy Dix began her column in 1896. Marie Manning started "Dear Beatrice Fairfax" in 1898. In 1902, George V. Hobart wrote a humorous advice column, "Dinkelspiel Answers Some Letters", in the San Francisco Examiner. In 1906, a column called "A Bintel Brief" ran in the Jewish Daily Forward in New York, which answered questions from new immigrants. From 1941 to her death in 1962, Eleanor Roosevelt wrote an advice column, If You Ask Me, first published in Ladies Home Journal and then later in McCall's. A selection of her columns was compiled in the book If You Ask Me: Essential Advice from Eleanor Roosevelt in 2018.

An unusual advice column that foreshadowed internet forums was "Confidential Chat" in the Boston Globe. Launched in 1922 and published until 2006, readers both asked and answered questions without a columnist as intermediary.

Advice columns proliferated in American newspapers early in the twentieth century as publishers recognized their value in capturing the interest of women, a key advertising demographic. An advice column for teenagers, "Boy Dates Girl" by Gay Head, started in Scholastic magazine in 1936. Advice columns specifically for teens became more common in the 1950s, such as "Ask Beth" which began in the Boston Globe and was then syndicated to 50 papers.

More recently, advice columns have been written by experts in specific fields. One example is sex therapist Dr. Ruth Westheimer, writing for Ask Dr. Ruth.

Unlike the broad variety of questions in the earlier columns, modern advice columns tended to focus on personal questions about relationships, morals, and etiquette. However, despite the perception that sex was not a topic in advice columns early in the twentieth century, questions about sexual behavior, practices, and expectations were addressed in advice columns as early as the 1920s, although not in the explicit manner that can be found today.

Many advice columns are now syndicated and appear in several newspapers. Prominent American examples include Dear Abby, Ann Landers, Carolyn Hax's Tell Me About It, and Slate.com's Dear Prudence. In the 1970s, the Chicago Tribune and New York Daily News Syndicate estimated that 65 million people read "Dear Abby" daily. As recently as 2000, both the Ann Landers and "Dear Abby" syndicated columns were published in over 500 newspapers.

Internet sites such as the Elder Wisdom Circle offer relationship advice to a broad audience; Dear Maggie offers sex advice to a predominantly Christian readership in Christianity Magazine, and Miriam's Advice Well offers advice to Jews in Philadelphia. These days, men as advice columnists are rarer than women in print, but men have been appearing more often online in both serious and comedic formats.

== Influence on society ==
Advice columns were not simply informational; from the days of The Athenian Mercury, they contributed to a sense of community in which readers not only learned from others' issues vicariously, but engaged with each other by offering their own answers to questions already published or by challenging advice given by the columnist. David Gudelunas, in his book Confidential to America, said "It was through reading columns such as "Dorothy Dix" and "Ann Landers" that Americans learned what the other half was up to—no matter what half they themselves represented."

When people wrote letters, they were writing not only to the columnist, but also to their peers who would read about their problems. By discussing shared issues, advice columns contribute to a common understanding of mores and communal values. For example, as a community dialog, "A Bintel Brief" provided Eastern European Jewish immigrants with advice on adjusting to American life and helped bridge their disparate national cultures. David Gudelunas states "Newspaper advice columns in the twentieth century are just as much about community discussions as they were in the seventeenth century."

Readers took advantage of the anonymity of letters to advice columns to use it as a confessional. It gave them the opportunity to share information about themselves and their lives that, as many said in their letters, they were "too embarrassed" to tell people they knew. The advice column, with its views into the lives of others, became a tool in ventures as disparate as children's counseling and teaching English as a second language.

A male British columnist felt that his column served several useful purposes: referrals to public services, education, and reassurance. He also noted the cathartic value to the letter writers.

Due their national reach and popularity, advice columns could also be a tool for activism. In the 1980s, Ann Landers wrote an anti-nuclear column and encouraged her readers to clip it and forward it; over 100,000 letters were received by the White House. One million copies of her 1971 column supporting a cancer bill were sent to President Nixon.

== In fiction ==
The "Agony Aunt" has become the subject of fiction, often satirically or farcically. Versions of the form include:

- An agony aunt whose own personal problems and issues are more bizarre than those of her correspondents. A notable example is the British TV sitcom Agony created by Anna Raeburn, starring Maureen Lipman as the agony aunt with an overbearing mother, an unreliable husband, neurotic gay neighbours, and a career in media surrounded by self-promoting bizarros. Anna Raeburn herself works as an agony aunt on radio call-in shows, much as the main character of the sitcom does.
- Mrs. Mills deliberately gives terrible advice to her clients, and is a satire of an agony aunt.
- Another classic example of the agony aunt in fiction appears in Miss Lonelyhearts (1933) by Nathanael West.
- In Evelyn Waugh's novel The Loved One, a Mr. Slump dispenses advice (on one occasion, it is lethal) under the name Guru Brahmin.
- In Terry Pratchett's Discworld series, the Agony Aunts are elderly but violent enforcers for the Seamstress Guild, pausing in their pursuit of offenders only to shop for bargains at rummage sales.
- In The Brady Bunch episode "Dear Libby", the six kids of a blended family see a problem similar to their family is having in an eponymous advice column, and worry their (blended) family may not survive. After all the children also post their questions to the column, the columnist herself visits the family and provides them relief by saying that the person who posted the original question did not come from this family.
- The pilot episode of Drake and Josh has Josh play an advice columnist named Miss Nancy.

== Listing of columnists ==
=== American advice columnists ===
- Amy Alkon (Ask the Advice Goddess)
- April Masini (Relationship Advice Forum: Ask April)
- Helen Bottel (Helen Help Us!)
- E. Jean Carroll (Ask E. Jean)
- Harriette Cole (Sense & Sensitivity)
- George W. Crane (Worry Clinic, Test Your Horse Sense)
- Alma Denny ("Alma Denny")
- Amy Dickinson (Ask Amy)
- Silence Dogood pen name of Benjamin Franklin
- Quentin Fottrell (The Moneyist)
- Lori Gottlieb (Dear Therapist)
- Carolyn Hax (Tell Me About It)
- Margo Howard (Dear Prudence and Ask Ann Landers)
- Daniel M. Lavery (Dear Prudence)
- Eppie Lederer (Ask Ann Landers)
- Judith Martin (Miss Manners)
- Pauline Phillips (Dear Abby)
- Dan Savage (Savage Love)
- Jeffrey L. Seglin (The Right Thing)
- Cheryl Strayed (Dear Sugar)
- Cary Tennis (Since You Asked)
- Emily Yoffe (Dear Prudence)

=== British advice columnists ===
- Dolly Alderton
- Katie Boyle
- Cathy Cassidy
- ChildLine's "Ask Sam", a children's advice column
- Mrs Crackenthrope in The Tatler
- Suzi Godson, who has written a weekly sex advice column in the Saturday Times since 2004
- Wendy Greengross, agony aunt for The Sun, 1972–76
- Phillip Hodson
- Virginia Ironside
- Jeremy Kyle
- Richard Madeley
- Patricia Marie in The Lady
- Melanie McFadyean, agony aunt for Just Seventeen magazine, 1983–86
- Penelope Mortimer
- Coleen Nolan
- Dami Olonisakin, who writes the blog Simply Oloni
- Sharon Osbourne, agony aunt for Love It! magazine, 2009–10
- Philippa Perry
- Marjorie Proops in the Daily Mirror
- Susan Quilliam
- Anna Raeburn
- Claire Rayner of The Sun and the Sunday Mirror
- Denise Robertson
- Deidre Sanders of The Sun
- Nik and Eva Speakman
- Miriam Stoppard in the Daily Mirror
- Graham Norton, who presented an agony uncle programme called Grill Graham on BBC Radio 2
- Susan Sutherland Isaacs, who worked under the pseudonym "Ursula Wise" in several child care journals
- David Tang, who wrote an advice column for the Financial Times Weekend edition

=== Other advice columnists ===
- Yueh Chai-chun
- Boronia Lucy Giles
- Polly Gillespie
- Solange Harvey

=== Advice columnists in fiction ===
- Phoebe Halliwell, television series Charmed
- Miss Lonelyhearts (1933), novel
- Mrs. Mills Solves all Your Problems,The Sunday Times Style magazine
- Jane Lucas in the British sitcom Agony (1979–81), played by Maureen Lipman
- Straight Talk (1992), a film featuring Dolly Parton as an agony aunt

== See also ==
- Islamic advice literature
- Responsa
