= Richard Sault =

English mathematician, editor and translator

Richard Sault (c. 1630s – 1702) was an English mathematician, editor and translator, one of The Athenian Society. On the strength of his Second Spira he is also now credited as a Christian Cartesian philosopher.

== Life ==
He kept in 1694 a mathematical school in Adam's Court, Broad Street, near the Royal Exchange, London. John Dunton the publisher, learning of him and his skill in mathematics, supplied him with literary work. When the notion of establishing The Athenian Mercury occurred to Dunton, he sought Sault's aid as joint editor and contributor. The first number came out on 17 March 1691, and the second on 24 March. Before the third number Dunton and Sault had joined them, Dunton's brother-in-law, Samuel Wesley. There are Articles of agreement between Sam. Wesley, clerk, Richard Sault, gent., and John Dunton, for the writing the Athenian Gazette, or Mercury, dated April 10, 1691. Originally executed by the three persons. Sault was reputed to be a gentleman of courage and passion, and on one occasion about to draw his sword on Tom Brown, one of the editors of a rival publication, the Lacedemonian Mercury.

In February 1695 the programme of a projected scheme of a new royal academy stated that the mathematics would be taught in Latin, French, or English by Sault and Abraham De Moivre. About 1700 Sault moved to Cambridge, where he died in May 1702 in poverty, supported by charitable scholars. He was buried in the church of St Andrew the Great on 17 May 1702.

== Works ==
Dunton published in 1693 The Second Spira, being a fearful example of an Atheist who had apostatized from the Christian religion, and died in despair at Westminster, Dec. 8, 1692. By J. S. Dunton obtained the manuscript from Sault, who professed to know the author. The original Spira was Francesco Spiera. The preface to Dunton's volume was signed by Sault's initials, and the genuineness of the information supplied was attested by many witnesses. With it is bound up A Conference betwixt a modern Atheist and his friend. By the methodizer of the Second Spira, London, John Dunton, 1693. Thirty thousand copies of the Second Spira sold in six weeks. It is one of the seven books which Dunton repented printing, because he came to the conclusion that Sault was only depicting his own mental and moral experiences. He printed in his memoirs a letter from Sault's wife, in which she accused her husband of loose living, as some proof of Sault's extramarital sex life, arguing this as a cause of his mental troubles.

William Leybourne's Pleasure with Profit (London, 1694) contains, as an appendix, Sault's A Treatise of Algebra (52pp), in which Sault's pays special attention to Joseph Raphson's recent (1690) treatment of Converging Series for all manner of adfected equations, but prefaced by Sault's own notion of punctation of series (there is no explicit contribution from Raphson) . It is unclear what relationship there might have been between Sault and Raphson, but the issue of Memoirs for the Ingenious for July, 1693 contains an exchange of letters on geometrically inspired speculation of the sort Raphson treated in De Spatio Reali (1697) and Demonstratio de Deo (1710), followed by a letter dedicated to the Honoured Joseph Raphson, FRS; the case of worms on the tongue mentioned in this latter letter was then taken up in correspondence in Philosophical Transactions in 1694 (where, however, Raphson is given as Ralphson, as also in Edmund Halley's paper in the same volume). Sault, like Raphson, also worked on translations from the French. His translation of Nicolas Malebranche's Concerning the Search after Truth (London, 1694, 1695) appeared in two volumes, both dedicated to the Marquess of Normanby; the second volume includes Sault's translation of a recent biography of Malebranche. In the Philosophical Transactions for 1698 is a short two-page note by Sault on Curvæ Celerrimi Descensus investigatio analytica, which shows that Sault was acquainted with Isaac Newton's geometrical theory of vanishing quantities, and with the notation of fluxions. In 1699, Sault published a translation into English from the third Latin edition of Breviarium Chronologicum, by Gyles Strauchius (Aegidius Strauch II), a professor in the university of Wittenberg (the title page of the second (1704) edition has the by-then-dead Sault mistakenly as FRS).
