= The Athenian Society =

Innovative Serial Publication launched in London in 1691

An Emblem of ye Athenian Society. 1692. Engraved by Frederik Hendrik van Hove for Charles Gildon's The History of the Athenian Society

The Athenian Society was an organization founded by John Dunton in 1691 to facilitate the writing and publication of his weekly periodical The Athenian Mercury. Though represented as a large panel of experts, the society reached its peak at four members: Dunton, Dr. John Norris, Richard Sault and Dunton's brother-in-law, Rev. Samuel Wesley. The group would answer the questions of readers about any topic, creating the first advice column. In 1693, for four weeks, The Athenian Society published also The Ladies' Mercury, the first periodical published that was specifically designed just for women.

== History ==
In 1691, John Dunton founded the Athenian Society (not to be confused with several other Athenian societies) in order to publish a journal. This group was originally composed of a small number of friends: John Dunton and mathematics teacher Richard Sault, then philosopher Dr. John Norris (though he declined to be part of the Society in writing and associated to profits), quickly joined by Dunton's brother-in-law the poet Rev. Samuel Wesley (according to Dunton, it would eventually grow to 12 members; there is no evidence of such additional members, though). Its name, and all its subsequent related "Athenian" names, derived from a biblical reference to St. Paul in Athens: "For all the Athenians and strangers which were there spent their time in nothing else, but either to tell, or to hear some new thing." (Acts 17:21 KJV)

The society was established in order to write and publish the Athenian Gazette, become The Athenian Mercury with its second issue due to a legal threat, a journal sold one penny twice weekly, then four times a week. It professed to answer in print all questions received from anonymous readers on "divinity, history, philosophy, mathematics, love, poetry", and things in general; the answers (and sometimes the questions) were written anonymously by "a Member of the Athenian Society" (one of the four friends).

The new journal received a tremendous response and generated several imitations. On 14 February 1692 a young Jonathan Swift sent them a letter of appreciation along with an "Ode to the Athenian Society", his first published work. Concurrently to the periodical, issues of the journal were bound in calf leather and sold as The Athenian Gazette, collecting a whole volume for 2.5 shilling (about one month after the last issue collected was released), a more permanent form with indexes preferred by learned customers and distinguished women; this is why the journal is often referenced to by its original Athenian Gazette name rather than the Athenian Mercury issues.

=== Demise of the society ===
In 1695, a glut of new titles led to the journal temporarily pausing in early 1696; in 1697, the death of Dunton's wife and the departure of Wesley after he received a promotion, led to a brief and aborted revival of the journal. It had run for 580 issues across nineteen volumes and a third: from 17 March 1691 to 8 February 1696 (19 full volumes of thirty issues, with a temporary closure between July and September 1692), then from May to 14 June 1697 (ten issues).

In 1703, Dunton sold the Athenian Mercury to publisher Andrew Bell, who collected selected and abridged parts in larger volumes called The Athenian Oracle, 3 volumes in 1703–04, with multiple reprints. Dunton would go on to project compiling three more volumes (without serialization), releasing only the 4th in 1710. All four volumes were reprinted in 1728.
