= Cary Tennis =

American author and columnist

Cary D. Tennis
- Born: September 11, 1953 (age 73)
- Occupation: Author
- Writing career
- Period: 2001–2013
- Genre: Columnist
- Subject: Advice
- Notable work: Salon column "Since You Asked"

Cary D. Tennis (born September 11, 1953) is an American author and columnist. He is best known for his work as an advice columnist in his column "Since You Asked" on the website Salon.com which ran for twelve years (2001–2013). Critic Siobhan Welch said of him "Cary Tennis has resurrected the advice column into a relevant, even thriving, literary form. He is the Anti-Dear Abby, with a style more reminiscent of an essayist’s ruminations than the pat responses usually found in print."

Cary Tennis graduated cum laude from the University of Miami in 1976 with a B.A. in literature and journalism and entered the masters program in creative writing at San Francisco State University in 1978. He passed his oral examinations (Wallace Stevens, William Faulkner and Vladimir Nabokov) and had his creative thesis approved ("The Riverwood House and Other Stories"), but he never completed the degree program.

After university, Tennis worked in the mailroom of Western Electric in San Francisco, worked as a bike messenger, formed a new wave band called the Repeat Offenders (wrote, sang, played guitar), and worked as a rock journalist for the SF Weekly.

In the late 1990s he spent five years in a clerical job at Chevron. In 1999 he started working for Salon Magazine, first as copy editor, then copy chief and from 2001 as Salon's resident advice columnist.

Tennis's "Since You Asked" column began in 2001, and was based on a previous column by Garrison Keillor entitled Mr. Blue which appeared in Salon's Books section. In an unusual format for advice columns, "Since you Asked" publishes long letters, sometimes of 1,000 words, and equally long responses.

In the column, Tennis makes occasional reference to his own life, both as a suffering cancer patient and a recovering alcoholic.

Tennis writes of his craft: "I'm no expert. I know the same things we all know," he says. "What I'm offering is, you know, good writing! Good writing can clarify overlooked or obscure areas of emotion. With sufficient craft, these things can be illuminated, and in a way that's pleasurable to read. Plus I'm kind. I offer sympathy to people who are in trouble."

Tennis writes of America: "Nothing has changed structurally; we are still a hateful, war-waging culture that denigrates women, celebrates killing, despoils the planet, plunders the resources of less powerful people, keeps a permanent underclass in virtual economic slavery and wages imperialist wars abroad. We're still the same country we were when I was growing up in the 1960s.".

In 2007, Tennis wrote Since You Asked, which is a collection of articles from his column.

Tennis announced in his column of November 19, 2009, that he has been diagnosed with a chordoma, a rare malignant tumor that usually occurs in the spine and base of the skull.

On Monday, September 30, 2013 Tennis posted on his Facebook page that he had been fired by Salon. He also noted this in the comments section to his column on that date. No explanation for the firing was provided.

Tennis was born in Portsmouth, Virginia. He is based in Italy and is married.
