= The Athenian Mercury =

Newspaper

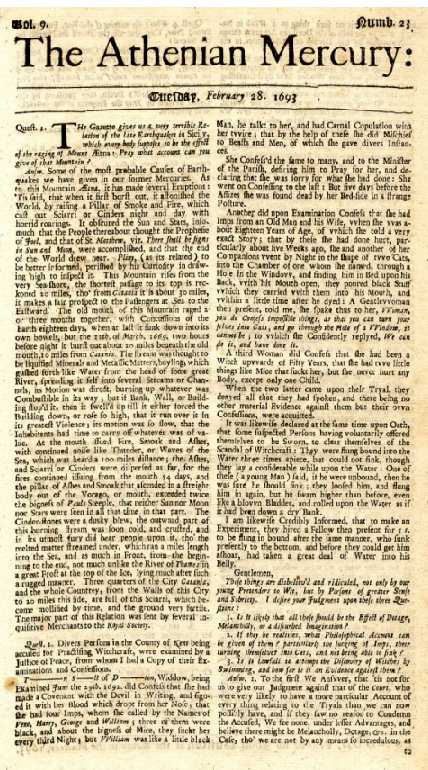
Athenian Mercury February 28, 1693

The Athenian Mercury, or The Athenian Gazette, or The Question Project, or The Casuistical Mercury, was a periodical written by The Athenian Society and published in London twice weekly between 17 March 1690 (i.e. 1691 Gregorian calendar) and 14 June 1697. John Dunton was the editor in chief. A spin-off of The Athenian Mercury, The Ladies' Mercury, was also published by The Athenian Society, in 1693, for four weeks. It was the first periodical that catered specifically to women readers.

== Title ==
The magazine was initially called The Athenian Gazette or The Casuistical Mercury in its first printings. Dunton explains in his autobiography Life and Errors he had an inspiration for the title one day while he was walking home that he would "not exchange for 50 guineas." He continues that a reader of his magazine need only consult Acts 17:21 to see the reasoning behind the title.

After the first issue was published, concerns were raised about Dunton's use of the word "Gazette", to which the 25-year-old London Gazette could be considered to have prior claim; in response, Dunton changed "Gazette" to "Mercury".

== Advice column ==
An Emblem of ye Athenian Society. 1692. Engraved by Frederik Hendrik van Hove for Charles Gildon's The History of the Athenian Society

Scholars credit Dunton with initiating the advice column format. It was first used in The Athenian Mercury in 1691. He formed a "society of experts", which he called The Athenian Society, to give their knowledgeable advice on questions submitted by the magazine's readers. The magazine had an announcement at the end encouraging readers to send in their questions, All Persons whatever may be resolved gratis in any Question that their own satisfaction or curiosity shall prompt 'em to, if they send their Questions by a Penny Post letter to Mr. Smith at his Coffee-house in Stocks Market in the Poultry, where orders are given for the reception of such Letters, and care shall be taken for their Resolution by the next Weekly Paper after their sending. The "most nice and curious questions" ran from natural sciences to religion to literature to politics. During the lifetime of the magazine "the experts" grappled with thousands of questions. The readers submitted questions like:

- Were there any men before Adam?
- Is there an impartial and true history of the world?
- How can a man know when he dreams or when he is really awake?

In addition to questions on everyday life, religion, and the soul, people sent in questions on supernatural subjects such as witches and ghosts.

Dunton's "question-answer project", as he referred to his new format, needed people to help publish it. The first person who partnered with him was Richard Sault, a mathematics teacher. Sault understood the philosophy of Nicolas Malebranche and could convey it to Dunton. The first two issues of the magazine were composed and published by these two only. The "surprising and unthought of" magazine's style produced a response of hundreds of letters of inquiries. The Athenian Gazette, as these first two issues were called, produced such a large readership that an increase in their Society membership of "experts" was required.

The next person to join the "secret" society of the Athenians was one Dr. Norris (likely the physician Edward Norris, the fifth son of Thomas Norris of Lancashire) who devoted his assistance without any compensation or recognition. As readership increased and the amount of inquiries became overwhelming, they added another member, Dunton's brother-in-law the poet Reverend Samuel Wesley. The Society consisted of these four real members and several fictional members.

Because Dunton's "answers to correspondents" were "universally received" his "Children of the Brain" were being plagiarized by a copycat publication called The Lacedemonian Mercury. He fought this with advertising that said any queries that they had replied to should be resubmitted to his magazine for amendments. Dunton referred to Tom Brown, chief editor of The Lacedemonian Mercury, as "the chief Antagonist."

Some of the people who read the advice column in The Athenian Mercury, and sometimes submitted questions and comments of their own, according to Dunton, were Sir William Temple (pertaining to talismans, amongst other things), Jonathan Swift, Marquess of Halifax, Sir Thomas Pope Blount, Sir William Hedges, and Sir Peter Pett.

== Related contemporary texts ==
=== Periodicals ===
Dunton was surprised one day early on into his "question project" with a letter that came from a "gentle-woman" who wish to know if ladies could submit inquiries also. He assured them that their questions would be seriously considered, as on 23 May 1691 The Athenian Mercury printed the "gentle-woman's" questions. One thing lead to another and on 28 February 1693 The Ladies' Mercury, a spin-off, started its own publication, a periodical exclusively for women.

Dunton followed in 1703 with a collection of the questions and answers from The Athenian Mercury called the Athenian Oracle. The concept of questions submitted by readers of a periodical and free "expert advice" given was then followed by writer Daniel Defoe with his Review in 1704, followed by The little Review. Then in 1708 came The British Apollo.

=== Satire ===
A comical representation of the Athenian Society written by Elkanah Settle, published in 1693 and titled The New Athenian Comedy, satirizes the mythical members of the Athenian Society and plays fun at the premises of the Athenian Mercury.

== Historiographical approach ==
The Athenian Mercury is approached by most scholars in the context of Dunton's life. Additionally, analysis of the questions in the Athenian Mercury has been focused on the political and scientific content portrayed by the authors. Though this approach is useful, the Athenian Mercury can also be analysed in the context of gender representation due to the number of questions about courtship and gender relations. Helen Berry, in her book Gender, Society and Print Culture in Late-Stuart England: The Cultural World of the Athenian Mercury, focuses more on the 30% of questions that are directly related to gender issues, a subject first broached by Kathryn Shevelow in Women and Print Culture: The Construction of Femininity in the Early Periodical. The most recent work on the Athenian Mercury is "I Humbly Beg Your Speedy Answer: Letters on Love & Marriage from the World's First Personal Advice Column, edited by Mary Beth Norton and published in 2025 by Princeton University Press.
