= Marjorie Proops =

British journalist (1911–1996)

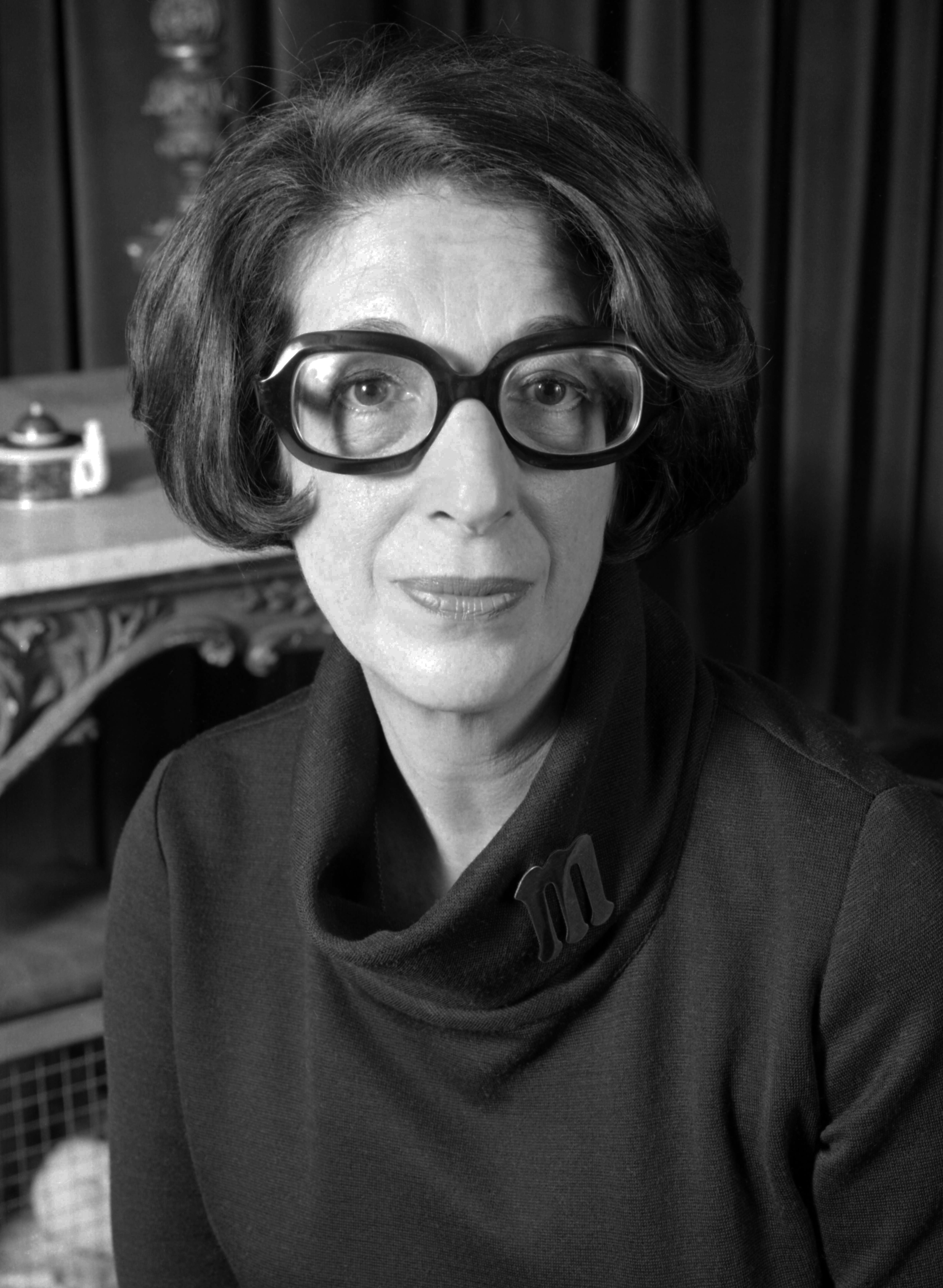
Proops photographed by Allan Warren

Rebecca Marjorie Proops OBE (formerly Rayle, née Israel; 10 August 1911 – 10 November 1996) was a journalist and agony aunt in the United Kingdom, writing the column Dear Marje for the Daily Mirror newspaper.

Proops was born in Woking, Surrey, as the elder daughter of Alfred (a publican) and Martha Israel (née Rayle). Alfred Israel later had the family name changed to Rayle. The family moved to London and Proops was educated at Dalston County Grammar School. She excelled at English and art, and had a fine contralto voice. Her teachers, nevertheless, advised her against matriculation. Instead, she took a drawing course that enabled her to get a job in a studio near Smithfield. In 1935, she married Sidney Joseph Proops, with whom she had a son, Robert.

In 1939, Proops became a journalist. Her first job was as fashion correspondent for the Daily Mirror. Following the death of the problem page editor, Proops was given the job of reading and answering her correspondence, and soon became the agony aunt herself, a post she held until her own death. As well as being an adviser, she used her column to campaign for numerous causes. One that she advocated for was the establishment of special "suites" for the treatment and interviewing of rape victims, to minimise the stigma of reporting such crimes.

Her radio appearances included a guest spot on the BBC Radio 4 comedy programme Just a Minute. Her book Pride, Prejudice and Proops (Time Remembered) was published in 1975, followed by Dear Marje a year later.

In 1971 Gilbert O'Sullivan mentioned her in his single "Underneath The Blanket Go".

She was appointed OBE in 1969, awarded Woman of the Year in 1984, had a waxwork in Madame Tussauds in 1977 and in 1971 appeared on This is Your Life. In 2008 it was reported that a BBC biopic drama about her life was in production.

Proops died on 10 November 1996, aged 85. She is buried at Golders Green Jewish Cemetery, in London, England.
