= Dear Deidre =

Agony aunt column in The Sun

Dear Deidre was the British newspaper The Sun's long running agony aunt column written by Deidre Sanders. Dear Deidre is also a phone-in section on the long-running British daytime TV programme This Morning, where the section has viewers calling live on the show asking for help from Deidre Sanders.

June Deidre Sanders (born 9 June 1945), a graduate of Sheffield University, was responsible for the feature which bears her name since November 1980 until her retirement at the end of 2020. She had previously written for Nova, Woman's Own and The Sunday Times. On 27 September 2022, Sanders announced during an interview with This Morning that she had been diagnosed with breast cancer. She underwent successful surgery and continued her treatment while making occasional appearances on the show.

In January 2023, Sanders was appointed MBE for her services to charity and mental health. Her husband of 55 years, Rick, died just days after she received the honour. Despite these personal challenges, Sanders continued to advocate for mental health awareness and encouraged viewers to seek help when needed.

After Sanders' retirement, Sally Land took over the Dear Deidre column and continues to provide advice and support to readers. The column remains a popular feature in The Sun, addressing a wide range of personal issues and offering practical solutions.
