= Teague Land =

Book by John Dunton

Teague Land: or A Merry Ramble to the Wild Irish
- Author: John Dunton
- Publication date: 1698

Teague Land: or A Merry Ramble to the Wild Irish (1698) is a book by John Dunton describing his travels in Ireland in 1698.

== The text ==
Teague Land consists of seven letters to a fictional lady friend of Dunton, in which he describes his experiences while travelling around Ireland. The letters describe the journeys to the following places:

- First letter – Maynooth, Clonard, Mullingar, Athlone, Galway
- Second letter – Iar Connacht
- Third letter – On the road from Connemara to Dublin
- Letter four – Naas, Newbridge, Kildare, The Curragh
- Letter five – from Dublin to Malahide and back; to Drogheda
- Letter six – Dublin and its surroundings (I)
- Letter seven – Dublin and its surroundings (II)

In the course of the text Dunton describes death-bed confessions; wakes; funeral sermons, bread-making in Connemara; a deer-hunt with the O'Flaherty and his wolf-hounds; a dinner at an inn near Malahide.

== Relevance ==
The 'letters' are especially interesting because of the period and place. They relate to a time for which relatively few folklore-related accounts exist. Dunton's letters elucidate many facets of traditional life that are not detailed elsewhere. However, they cannot be read uncritically, as Dunton looked down upon the Irish. Nevertheless, they contain valuable information on religious and secular ceremonies, vernacular architecture, traditional food patterns and diet, Irish language words and terms, and local sayings.

== 2003 edition ==
The book was transcribed, edited and given an introduction by Andrew Carpenter, along with an essay on John Dunton and Irish folklore by Ríonach Uí Ógáin. It was published by Four Courts Press, Dublin, in 2003
