= Nadiya Dobrovolska-Zavadska =

Surgeon and geneticist

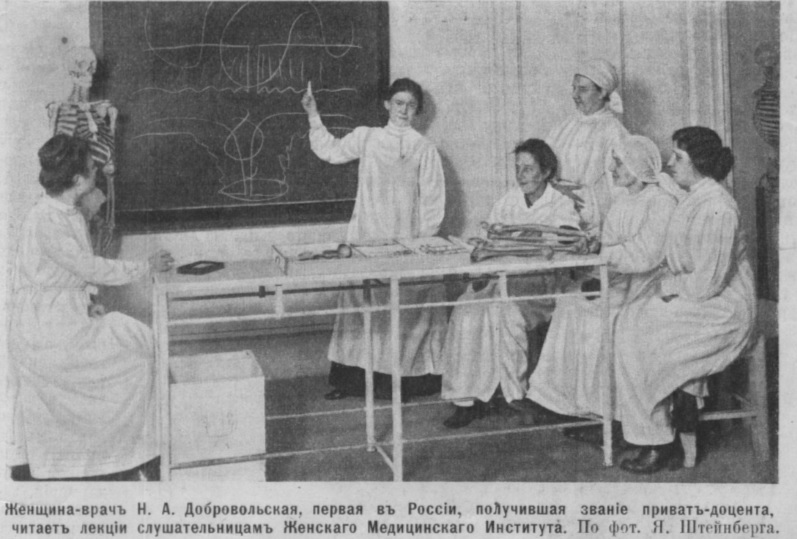
- Born: Kiev, Russian Empire now Ukraine
- Known for: Discovery of Brachyury gene in mice
- Scientific career
- Fields: Genetics, Cancer research, Surgery

Nadine Dobrovolskaïa-Zavadskaïa (Ukrainian: Надія Олексіївна Добровольська-Завадська; 25 September [O.S. 13 September] 1878 in Kyiv, former Russian Empire – 31 October 1954 in Milan, Italy) was a Russian and French researcher, surgeon and geneticist. She was likely born in Kyiv, studied in Saint Petersburg and was the first woman to become professor of surgery in Russian Soviet Federative Socialist Republic, in 1918. Where she took part in Russian Civil War and fled to Egypt just to find second home in Paris. There she made a genetic and oncology research career discovering Brachyury gene in mice. Also she established RIII mouse strain which helped to discover MMTV retrovirus.

== Biography ==
Nadiya Dobrovolska may have been born in Kyiv, or according to other sources, was born in Kozyatyn, Berdychiv County, Kyiv Province. Her father was Alexey Fyodorovich Dobrovolsky, and her mother was Tatiana Miheyevna. She graduated from Fundukleiv Women's Gymnasium.

She then entered the Women's Medical Institute in Saint Petersburg, where she studied from 1899 to 1904 and received a medical education as a surgeon. While studying, she also worked from 1902-1904 as an intern in the clinic of Professor Maksim Subbotin. After graduating from the institute she worked as a doctor in Vyatka province. In 1907, Nadezhda Dobrovolska was appointed assistant professor and later, associate professor of operative surgery at the Women's Medical Institute. In 1911, she received a doctorate in medicine. Starting in 1914, she was a part-time doctor at the Obukhiv Hospital in Saint Petersburg.

Later she worked as a professor at St. George's University (now the University of Tartu, Estonia ). Dobrovolska-Zavadskaya became the head of the department of surgery at the University in Voronezh from 1920-1921.

According to other sources, during the civil war in former Russian Empire and new Russian Soviet Federative Socialist Republic, she found herself in the ranks of the medical service of the "White Guard", with which she retreated in 1920 to the Crimea. From there she emigrated on the steamer "Romania" through Turkey to Egypt, where she was in a camp for refugees near the town of Tel el-Kebir. In 1921, she went to Paris.
