= The Ladies' Mercury =

Defunct British periodical

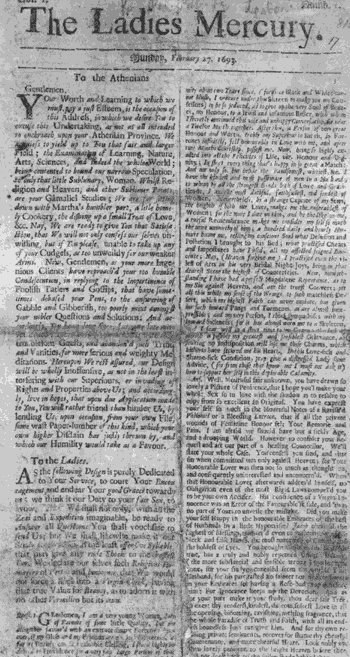
- The Ladies Mercury 27 February 1693
- Categories: Women's periodical
- Frequency: weekly
- Format: print
- Publisher: The Athenian Society; John Dunton
- First issue: February 27, 1693; 333 years ago
- Final issue Number: March 17, 1693; 4

The Ladies' Mercury was a periodical published in London by the Athenian Society notable for being the first periodical in English published and specifically designed for women readers.

== History ==
In 1690, London publisher John Dunton founded The Athenian Mercury, the first major periodical in England or Scotland designed to appeal to a general readership. Dunton's Athenian Mercury dealt with a range of topics such as science, religion, as well as private life, including sexuality. The Athenian Mercury was a public forum where questions were submitted by readers. Because of the presumed interest of women readers in domesticity, courtship, and marriage, the editors decided to devote the first Tuesday of each month to such topics, announced this policy on 3 June 1691, and invited "reasonable questions sent to us by the fair sex".

The monthly "ladies'" topics in the Athenian Mercury proved popular, and The Ladies Mercury was the result. Dunton is generally assumed to have been the editor although he did not acknowledge it and formally the editorship was given over to a "dimly realised Ladies Society" that promised to respond to "all the most nice and curious questions concerning love, marriage, behaviour, dress and humour of the female sex, whether virgins, wives, or widows." Also printed in London, each issue consisted of a single double-sided sheet taken up by an advice column, and the first was released on 27 February 1693.

The Ladies Mercury was only published for four weeks and the last issue appeared on 17 March 1693. One commentator has speculated that the run was so short because the new venture risked drawing away the women readers The Athenian Mercury itself cultivated. Another writes that while much remains obscure, The Ladies' Mercury "occupies a position in literary history that is incommensurate with its brief, four-issue, run."

== Legacy ==
Other publications designed specifically for women readers followed soon after: The Female Tatler was named for the Tatler, and The Female Spectator, edited by Eliza Haywood, was a monthly publication which took its name from Addison and Steele's The Spectator.

== Resources ==
- Berry, Helen. Gender, Society, and Print Culture in Late Stuart England: the cultural world of The Athenian Mercury. Aldershot: Ashgate, 2003.
- Harcup, Tony. "Ladies’ Mercury." A Dictionary of Journalism, Online, Oxford University Press, 2014, .
- Keeble, Richard, Print Journalism, Taylor & Francis, 2005, ISBN 0-415-35882-5
- Morrish, John, Magazine Editing: How to Develop and Manage a Successful Publication, Routledge, 2003, ISBN 0-415-30381-8
- Parsons, Nicola. "The Ladies Mercury." Women’s Periodicals and Print Culture in Britain, 1690–1820s: The Long Eighteenth Century, edited by Jennie Batchelor and Manushag N. Powell, Edinburgh University Press, 2018, pp. 315–26. Rpt. "The Ladies Mercury." Women's Periodicals and Print Culture in Britain, 1690-1820s. 2018. doi:10.3366/edinburgh/9781474419659.003.0021
- Stearns, Bertha-Monica. "The First English Periodical for Women." Modern Philology Vol. 28, No. 1 (Aug., 1930), pp. 45–59. JSTOR, http://www.jstor.org/stable/433233. Accessed 20 Sep. 2022.
- Turner, David M., Fashioning adultery: gender, sex, and civility in England, 1660–1740, Cambridge University Press, 2002, ISBN 0-521-79244-4

== See also ==
- The Athenian Mercury
- List of 18th-century British periodicals for women
