= Chordoma =

Type of spinal cancer

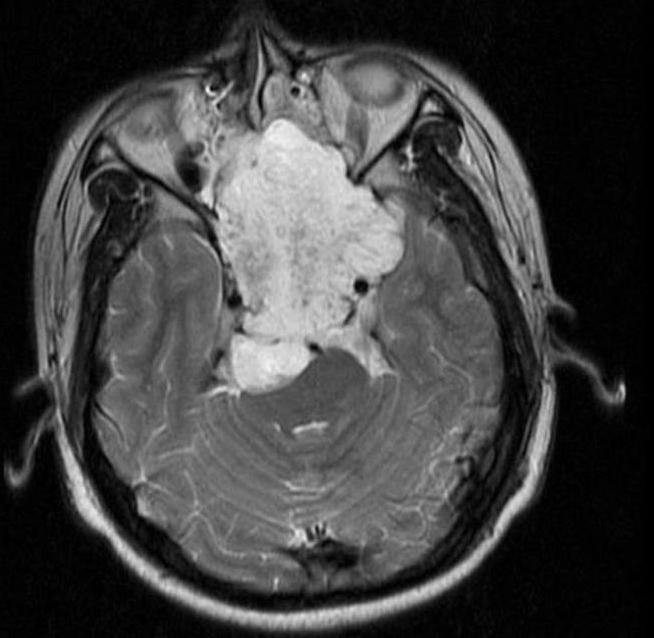
- MRI of extensive clival chordoma in 17-year-old male patient, axial view. Tumor in the nasopharynx extending from nasal cavity to brainstem posteriorly is clearly visible.
- Specialty: Oncology
- Frequency: 0.0001%

Chordoma is a rare slow-growing neoplasm (cancer) that arises from cellular remnants of the notochord in the bones of the skull base and spine. The evidence for the notochordal origin of chordoma is the location of the tumors (along the neuraxis), the similar immunohistochemical staining patterns, expression of brachyury, and the demonstration that notochordal cells are preferentially left behind in the clivus and sacrococcygeal regions when the remainder of the notochord regresses during fetal life.

In layman's terms, chordoma is a type of bone cancer, and is classified as a sarcoma. Chordomas are sometimes mistakenly referred to as brain, brainstem, or spinal-cord tumors due to their location near those critical structures, but they are not derived from nervous tissue.

== Presentation ==
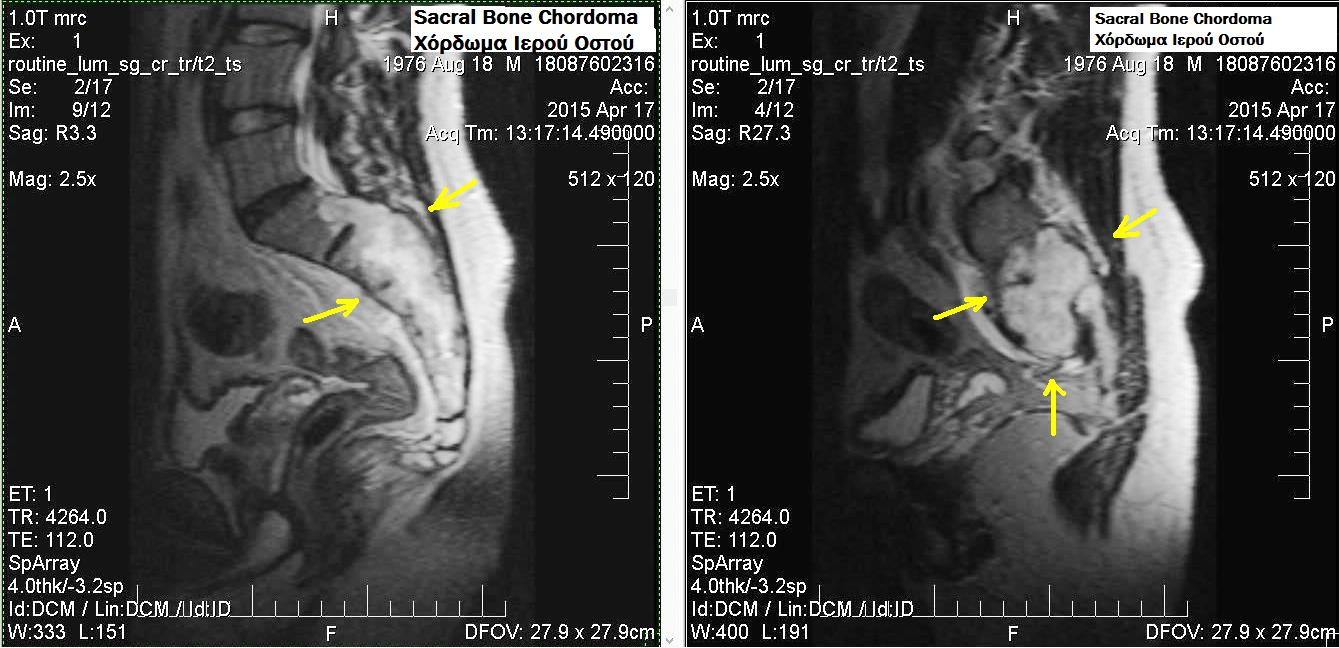
Sacral bone chordoma

Chordomas can arise from bone in the skull base and anywhere along the spine. The two most common locations are cranially at the clivus and in the sacrum at the bottom of the spine. Very rarely, chordomas present outside of the skull base or spine; these are called extra axial chordomas.

== Genetics ==
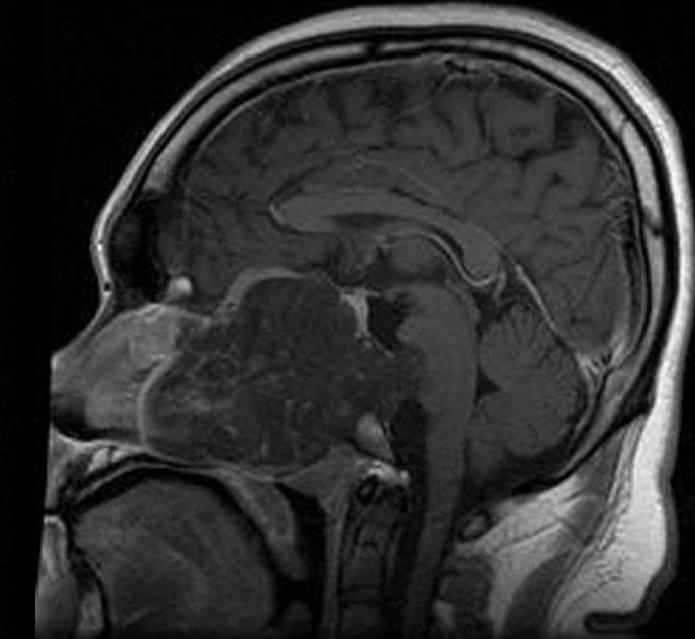
MRI of extensive clival chordoma in 17-year-old male patient, sagittal view. Tumor in the nasopharynx extending from nasal cavity to brainstem posteriorly is clearly visible.

A small number of families have been reported in which multiple relatives have been affected by chordoma. In four of these families, duplication of the brachyury gene was found to be responsible for causing chordoma.

A possible association with tuberous sclerosis complex (TSC1 or TSC2) has been suggested.

== Mechanism ==
- mTOR signaling is hyperactive in sporadic sacral chordomas: in one study 10 out of 10 sacral chordomas exhibited phosphorylation of Ribosomal protein s6 and EIF4EBP1 by immunohistochemistry
- Partial or complete PTEN (gene) deficiency is observed in nearly all sacral chordomas
- In a study of 49 chordomas Akt, TSC2, and EIF4EBP1 were phosphorylated in 92%, 96% and 98% of cases, respectively.
- In a tissue microarray containing 21 chordomas Platelet-derived growth factor receptor-beta (PDGFR-b), epidermal growth factor receptor (EGFR), KIT (CD117) and HER2 were detected in 100%, 67%, 33% and 0% of cases, respectively.
- The CDKN2A (p16) and CDKN2B (p15) loci on chromosome 9p21 are frequently deleted in chordomas Another study found CDKN2A immunoreactivity in just 4% of cases.
- 62% of chordomas express the High Molecular Weight Melanoma Associated Antigen, also known as Chondroitin sulfate proteoglycan 4 (CSPG4) which has been the target of immune therapy.
- In 2009, scientists discovered that an inherited gene duplication is responsible for the familial form of this disorder. Familial chordoma are rare, with an estimated rate of 0.4% in all Chordomas.

== Diagnosis ==
In 2015 the first consensus guidelines for the diagnosis and treatment of chordoma were published in The Lancet Oncology. These tumors express brachyury and cytokeratin, which can be detected by immunohistochemistry.

=== Classification ===
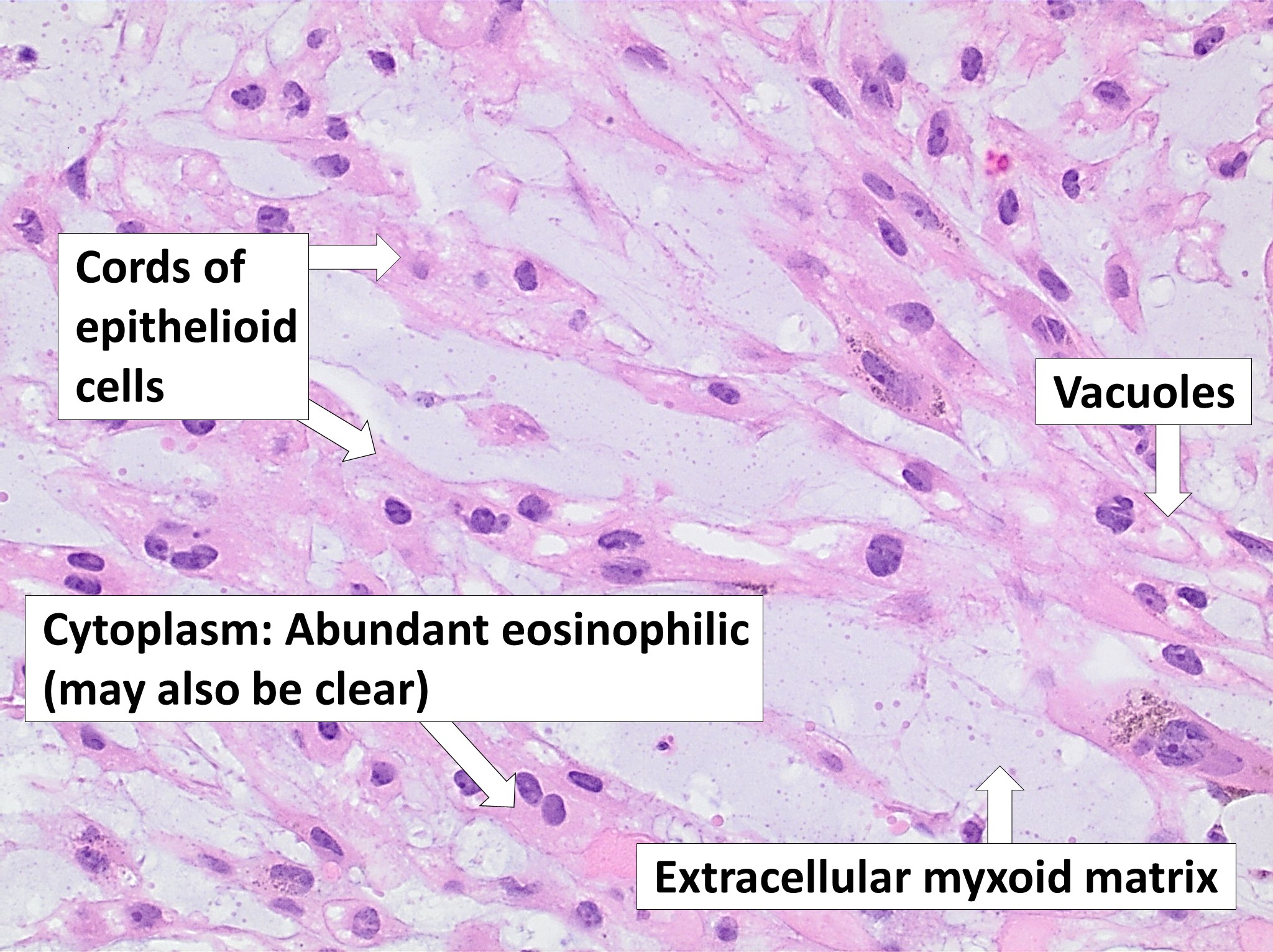
Micrograph showing a classical chordoma with its typical features. H&E stain.

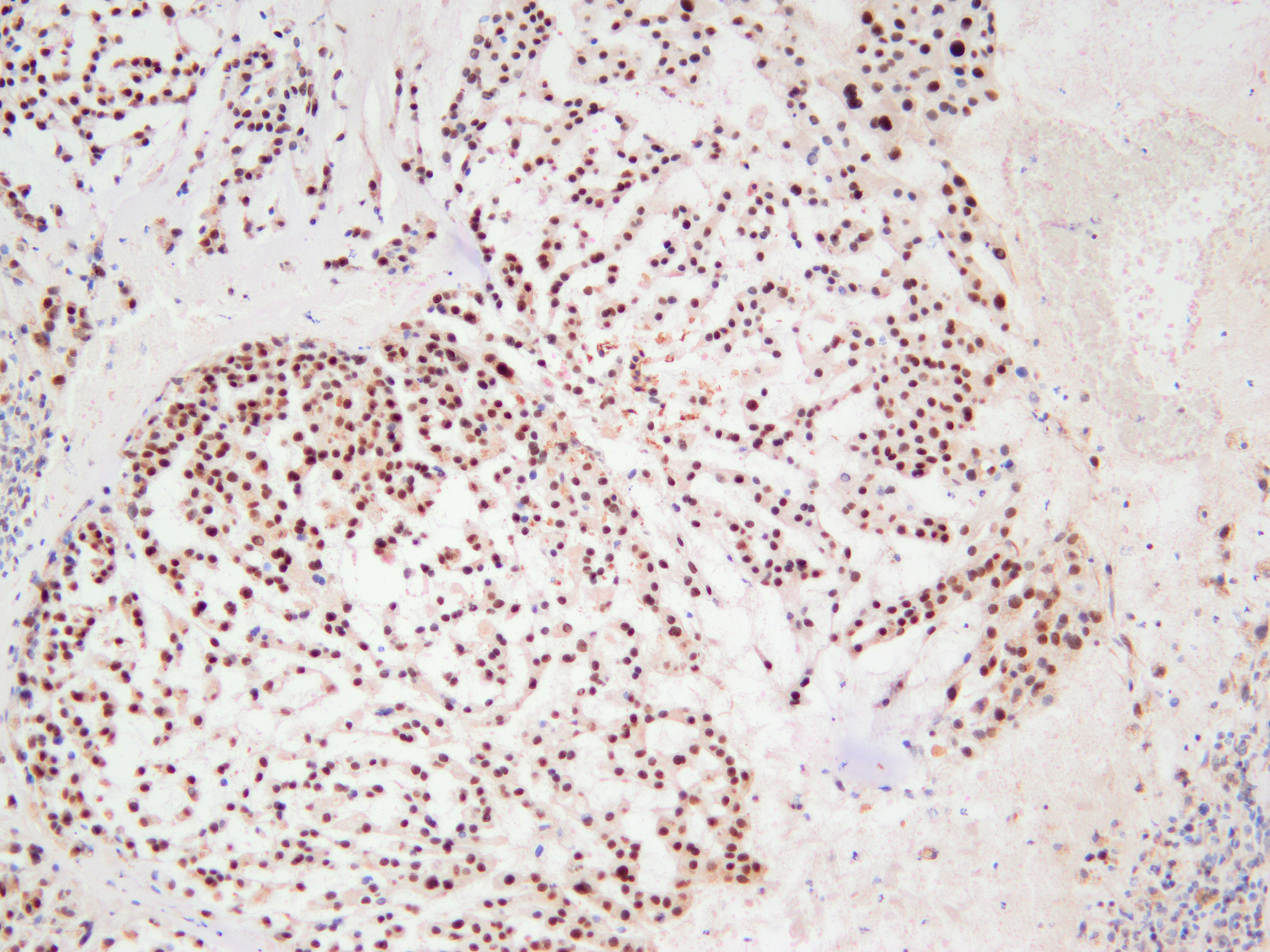
Chordoma showing nuclear staining for brachyury using immunohistochemistry.

There are three histological variants of chordoma: conventional, dedifferentiated, and poorly differentiated, with the latter having the worst prognosis.

- The histological appearance of classical chordoma is of a lobulated tumor composed of groups of cells separated by fibrous septa. The cells have small round nuclei and abundant vacuolated cytoplasm, sometimes described as "physaliferous" because of their cytoplasmic vacuoles, and their resemblance to the physalis plant.
- Dedifferentiated chordomas histologically show features of both chordoma and chondrosarcoma.
- Poorly differentiated chordomas lack many features common to conventional chordomas, including physaliferous cells. They occur more commonly at the skull base site and in women.

== Treatment ==
Consensus treatment guidelines have been developed to improve care quality and consistency. In 2015, an international panel published the first clinical practice guidelines for chordoma. In 2017, best practices were published for the treatment of recurrent chordoma.

In most cases, complete surgical resection followed by radiation therapy offers the best chance of long-term control. Incomplete resection of the primary tumor makes controlling the disease more difficult and increases the odds of recurrence. The decision whether complete or incomplete surgery should be performed primarily depends on the anatomical location of the tumor and its proximity to vital parts of the central nervous system.

Chordomas are relatively radioresistant, requiring high doses of radiation to be controlled. The proximity of chordomas to vital neurological structures such as the brain stem and nerves limits the dose of radiation that can safely be delivered. Therefore, highly focused radiation such as proton therapy and carbon ion therapy are more effective than conventional x-ray radiation.

There are no drugs currently approved to treat chordoma; however, several have shown modest benefit in clinical trials, such as the following:

- Pemetrexed: 14% objective response rate with median progression free survival of 10.5 months
- Pembrolizumab: 12% objective response rate with median progression free survival of 6.1 months
- Afatinib: 10% objective response rate with median progression free survival of 8.6 months
- Apatinib: 3% objective response rate with median progression free survival of 18 months
- Imatinib: 2% objective response rate with median progression free survival of 9.2 months

== Prognosis ==
In one study, the 10-year tumor free survival rate for sacral chordoma was 46%. Prognosis depends on many different factors. With appropriate treatment, many chordoma patients will live for a decade or more, and some can be cured.

== Epidemiology ==
In the United States, the annual incidence of chordoma is approximately 1 in one million (300 new patients each year).

Sacral chordomas make up 2 to 4% of all primary bone tumours and 44% of all primary sacral tumours, thus making it the most common malignant sacral tumor. About 50 to 60% of chordomas are located in the sacrococcygeal region. Males aged between 40 and 50 years are twice as likely as women to get sacral chordoma.

There are currently no known environmental risk factors for chordoma. As noted above germline duplication of brachyury has been identified as a major susceptibility mechanism in several chordoma families.

While most people with chordoma have no other family members with the disease, rare occurrences of multiple cases within families have been documented. This suggests that some people may be genetically predisposed to develop chordoma. Because genetic or hereditary risk factors for chordoma may exist, scientists at the National Cancer Institute are conducting a Familial Chordoma Study to search for genes involved in the development of this tumor.

== Notable cases ==
NFL player Craig Heyward was treated for a chordoma in 1998, which ended his career. While initially thought to be successfully removed, the tumor returned in 2005, and caused Heyward's death in May 2006.

Pro skateboarder Ray Underhill, a member of the Powell-Peralta Bones Brigade, battled chordoma for two years before succumbing to his disease in August 2008.

Cary Tennis, the popular advice columnist for Salon, announced in his column of November 19, 2009, that he had been diagnosed with a chordoma.

Former Spanish footballer José Enrique was diagnosed with chordoma in May 2018 and underwent surgery to remove the tumour in June of that year. As of 2022, he is doing well.

Gary Sinise's son, McCanna "Mac" Anthony Sinise, who was a musician, died on January 5, 2024 at the age of 33 from chordoma. He had been diagnosed with chordoma in 2018 and eventually became paralyzed from the waist down. Shortly after his passing, his family established the Moving Ahead for Cures (MAC) Fund in his honor with the goal of accelerating the development of new treatments for chordoma.

Prominent British scientist, Paul Workman, lost his mother, Ena, to chordoma in 1989 at the age of 68.

American plasma physicist Bill Dorland was diagnosed with chordoma in 2004. He was a co-founder of the Chordoma Foundation and was an active member of the chordoma patient community. He died on September 22, 2024 from the complications from the disease.
