= Amy Alkon =

American writer

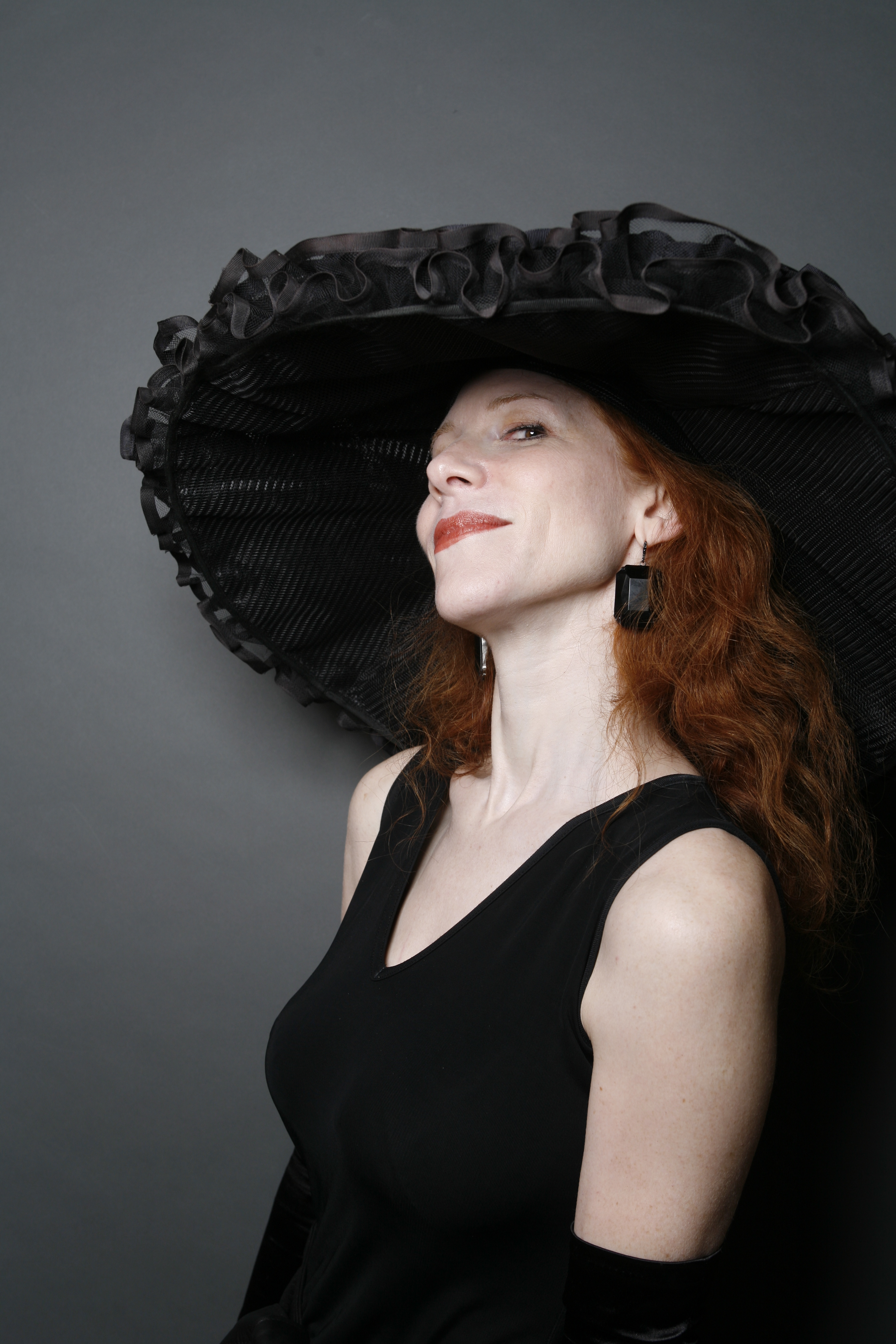
- Amy Alkon at DeepGlamour fashion celebration, 2009
- Born: Amy Alkon; March 8, 1964 (age 62); Farmington Hills, Michigan, United States
- Occupation: Advice columnist
- Writing career
- Pen name: The Advice Goddess
- Notable works: I See Rude People; Good Manners for Nice People Who Sometimes Say F*ck

Amy Alkon (born March 8, 1964), also known as the Advice Goddess, is an American advice columnist. Alkon wrote a weekly advice column, Ask the Advice Goddess, which was published in over 100 newspapers within North America. While Alkon addressed a wide range of topics, she primarily focused on issues in intimate relationships. Her columns were based largely on evolutionary psychology. Her last column was published on March 31, 2022.

== Life and career ==
Amy Alkon grew up in Farmington Hills, a suburb of Detroit, Michigan. She identifies as a weak atheist. Alkon credits her isolation as the catalyst that cultivated her early fondness for reading.

Alkon moved to New York City, where she dispensed advice on a street corner in SoHo as one of three women who called themselves "The Advice Ladies." This was not an occupation, merely a hobby, and their setup was minimal, using only folding chairs and a handmade sign advertising "Free Advice from a Panel of Experts". She co-authored a book, Free Advice - The Advice Ladies on Love, Dating, Sex, and Relationships with her fellow "Advice Ladies," Caroline Johnson and Marlowe Minnick. Her next book, a solo project entitled I See Rude People: One Woman’s Battle to Beat Some Manners Into Impolite Society, was published by McGraw Hill in November 2009.

Before billing herself as the "advice goddess," Alkon wrote Ask Amy Alkon, an advice column published solely in the New York Daily News.

In 2004, the Biography Channel featured Alkon in a series of one-minute shorts called "The Advice Minute With Amy Alkon." There were 11 in total and during these segments, which ran between the Biography Channel's regular programs, Alkon dispensed advice on the streets of New York, just as she had done with her cohorts years earlier.

== Disputes with TSA ==
Alkon refuses to pass through the full body scanners at airports ("Do you trust the government that they're safe?") and instead opts for a pat-down body search. In 2011, she was threatened with a defamation suit with damages of half a million US dollars by a TSA agent who Alkon alleges forced the side of her gloved hand into Alkon's vagina four times through her underwear. She said to the agent "You raped me". The agent, Thedala Magee, claimed that describing such an act as 'rape' constituted defamation, and that Alkon had described her as a 'bad person' for behaving in such a manner. Alkon was defended by First Amendment attorney Marc Randazza.

In a second incident, in November 2012, Alkon complained that a TSA agent "ran her hands, most disgustingly, all over my body, grazing my labia and touching my breasts and inside my turtleneck on my bare skin."

== Campaigns ==
Issues she has written and spoken of are unruly children, the behavior of which she attributes to bad parenting, inconsiderate cellphone users, and copyright violators.
