= Helen Bottel =

American journalist

Helen A. Bottel (March 13, 1914 – April 18, 1999) was an American newspaper columnist who wrote the long-running, nationally syndicated advice column Helen Help Us! in the 1960s and 1970s.

Although not as well known as the Dear Abby or Ann Landers columns, King Features Syndicate's Helen Help Us! syndicated newspaper column addressed concerns from parents regarding child behaviour, discipline, and parent-child relationships. Her advice focused on acknowledging what parents have control over (their own actions) and how to effectively apply limits and guidance to their children. One was teenage dating: she ran the "Stamp Out Steadying" or "S.O.S." campaign, which gave support to teenagers who did not want to succumb to pressure to "go steady". Another constant subject of letter writers to her column was suburban neighbors who would invade each other's privacy with spyglasses. From 1971 - 1980, she co-wrote the column with her daughter, Sue Bottel Peppers. She published at least three books, one of which was a collections of her columns.

At the age of 72, Helen left King Features Syndicate and self-syndicated in the Yomiuri Shimbun Newspaper in Japan, offering Western advice to Japanese readers.

In the 1990s, Bottel co-authored with eldest daughter, Kathy Bottel Bernhardt, a Look Who's Aging column for Senior magazine.

Helen was married for 63 years to Robert Edwin Bottel. They had four children, Robert Dennis Bottel, Rodger Markham Bottel, Roberta Kathryn Bottel (Kathy Bernhardt) and Suzanne Virginia Bottel (Peppers).

== Books ==
- Bottel, Helen. To Teens With Love. Doubleday, 1968. ISBN 0-385-07169-8.
- Bottel, Helen. Helen Help Us!. Grosset & Dunlap, 1970.
- Bottel, Helen. Parents' Survival Kit: A Reassuring Guide to Living Through Your Child's Teen-Age Years. Doubleday, 1978.
