= Suzi Godson =

Suzi Godson is The Times' sex and relationships columnist.

Born in Ireland, she moved to London aged 18 to study graphic design at Saint Martin's School of Art and the Royal College of Art. She subsequently acquired an Msc and a PhD in psychology at Birkbeck, University of London. In 2001, Godson launched the UK's first broadsheet sex column in The Independent On Sunday. She moved to The Times in 2004 and writes a weekly column answering questions about sex and relationships. Godson's Times column is syndicated to the Irish Examiner. Godson is the author of The Sex Book (Cassell), The Body Bible (Penguin) and Sex Counsel (Cassell). In 2017, she launched Tellmi, an anonymous, pre-moderated, peer support app for young people aged 11-25. Tellmi has been independently evidenced to improve mental health in young people].

Godson is married and has four children. Her youngest daughter has type one diabetes.
