= MIXL1 =

Protein-coding gene found in humans

Identifiers
- Aliases: MIXL1, MILD1, MIX, MIXL, Mix paired-like homeobox
- External IDs: OMIM: 609852; MGI: 1351322; GeneCards: MIXL1

Gene location (Human)
Chr.	Chromosome 1 (human)
Band	1q42.12	Start	226,223,618 bp
Band	1q42.12	End	226,227,060 bp

Gene location (Mouse)
Chr.	Chromosome 1 (mouse)
Band	1|1 H4	Start	180,520,608 bp
Band	1|1 H4	End	180,524,599 bp
RNA expression pattern
Bgee	Human / Mouse (ortholog); Top expressed in: oocyte; gonad; secondary oocyte; testicle; bone marrow cell; lymph node; appendix; tonsil; cerebellar cortex; duodenum / Top expressed in: tail of embryo; epiblast; primitive streak; embryo; embryo; morula; mesoderm; hypoblast; primitive endoderm; allantois; More reference expression data
BioGPS	n/a
Gene ontology
Molecular function	RNA polymerase II cis-regulatory region sequence-specific DNA binding; DNA binding; sequence-specific DNA binding; protein homodimerization activity; DNA-binding transcription activator activity, RNA polymerase II-specific; cis-regulatory region sequence-specific DNA binding; identical protein binding; DNA-binding transcription factor activity, RNA polymerase II-specific
Cellular component	nucleus
Biological process	cell differentiation; endoderm development; regulation of transcription, DNA-templated; endodermal cell differentiation; transcription by RNA polymerase II; transcription, DNA-templated; multicellular organism development; development of the heart; positive regulation of mesoderm development; gastrulation; hematopoietic progenitor cell differentiation; negative regulation of hematopoietic progenitor cell differentiation; cell migration involved in gastrulation; digestive tract development; endoderm formation; positive regulation of transcription by RNA polymerase II; hemopoiesis
Sources:Amigo / QuickGO
Orthologs
Databases	NCBI: entry; OMA: entry
Species	Human	Mouse
Entrez	83881	27217
Ensembl	ENSG00000185155	ENSMUSG00000026497
UniProt	Q9H2W2	Q9WUI0
RefSeq (mRNA)	NM_001282402; NM_031944	NM_013729
RefSeq (protein)	NP_001269331; NP_114150; NP_114150.1	NP_038757
Location (UCSC)	Chr 1: 226.22 – 226.23 Mb	Chr 1: 180.52 – 180.52 Mb
PubMed search
- Wikidata
View/Edit Human	View/Edit Mouse

Homeobox protein MIXL1 (or Mixl1) is a protein that in humans is encoded by the MIXL1 gene. It is a paired-type homeobox transcription factor weighing 27 kDa with 232 amino acids. Mixl1 transcription factor preferentially binds to the DNA sequence TAAT on the Mix gene. Mixl1 is part of the Mix/Bix family of transcription factors, with Mixl1 being the only member identified in humans. The Xenopus Mix gene and human Mix genese are homologues. Mixl1 is functionally similar to the Xenopus Mix.1.

Mixl1 is transiently expressed in the primitive streak of the gastrulating embryo, between embryonic day (E) 12 through E.19. Its expression is restricted to embryonic mesoderm precursors.

Also known as: Mix; Mix1; Mild1

== Function ==
Mixl1 plays a role in mesoderm patterning and tissue specification at gastrulation. It marks cells destined to be mesoderm and endoderm. Mixl1 expression is required for both mesoderm development and hematopoiesis. Mixl1 homologues are also a necessary intermediate for BMP4-induced ventral mesoderm patterning and differentiating ES cells.

== Clinical Significance ==
In mice, knockout of Mixl1 has resulted in embryonic death at E.8.5 due abnormalities in axial morphogenesis and a disruption of definitive endoderm. Overexpression of Mixl1 resulted in impaired hematopoietic differentiation which results in acute myeloid leukemia. In humans Mixl1 has been detected in leukemic cells lines from biopsy samples of individuals with high-grade lymphoma.

Observed Mixl1-null mutants resulted in embryonic arrest at the early somite stage. These mutants had a thick primitive streak, abnormal head folds, absence of heart tube and gut, and enlarged midline tissue mass that replaced the notochord.

== Interactions ==
Mixl1 has been shown to interact with BMP4.
