= Elder Wisdom Circle =

Nonprofit organization

The Elder Wisdom Circle (EWC) is a nonprofit organization that provides free and confidential advice on a broad range of topics. The EWC also publishes an advice column, in both a web version and a syndicated print version that is carried in 25 publications.

The Elder Wisdom Circle is targeted towards young people looking for advice from a "cyber-grandparent". Online advice seekers from all over the world are paired with a network of volunteer seniors (aged 60 to 105) who share their knowledge, insight, and wisdom. Most seeking advice are 15–40 years old, but people of any age can request advice on virtually any topic and will receive a free and personalized email response.

== Modus operandi ==
After submitting a request for advice through the EWC web site, a personal reply arrives via email, usually within a few days. Advice is provided on a wide range of issues, such as love and relationships, family and child rearing, career and self improvement, and cooking and home care. The service is confidential and advice seekers are assured anonymity and privacy. If a letter is selected for publication, any references to identifying information are removed; advice seekers may also request that their letter not be published.

== Background ==
The Elder Wisdom Circle was founded in 2001 by Doug Meckelson. A 501(c)(3) nonprofit organization based in the San Francisco Bay Area of California, the EWC is all-volunteer run and advice is provided at no cost. Since its inception, the EWC has continued to gain in popularity and now has more than 600 advice-giving volunteers. In 2011, the EWC ranked #1 in email advice in the Yahoo directory, and the Center for Civic Partnerships ranked the EWC one of the four most innovative inter-generational activities.

The Elder Wisdom Circle Guide for a Meaningful Life: Seniors Across America Offer Advice to the Next Generations
- Author: Doug Meckelson and Diane Haithman
- Language: English
- Genre: Self-help, personal development
- Publisher: Penguin Group
- Publication date: November 2007
- Publication place: US
- Media type: Trade paperback
- Pages: 280
- ISBN: 978-0-452-28881-2
- OCLC: 81944451
- Dewey Decimal: 305.2 22
- LC Class: HM726 .M43 2007

== The Elder Wisdom Circle Guide for a Meaningful Life ==
In the book The Elder Wisdom Circle Guide for a Meaningful Life by Doug Meckelson and Diane Haithman, 60 individual elders and nine elder groups from across North America tackle some of the most compelling questions that have come to the Elder Wisdom Circle.

The book provides a forum for multiple responses and creates a dialogue between elders, who apply their experience and knowledge to the following topics: Overcoming life's obstacles; parent-child relationships; sibling rivalry; self-discovery; lasting love; decision-making; career; aging; and loss. In the final chapter, the elders offer their secrets for living life the wise way.

== See also ==
- Gaudiano, Nicole (September 6, 2006). "Cybergrandparents dish on everything from sex to begonias". USA Today.
- Adler, Margot (February 21, 2006). "'Dear Elders' Dispense Advice Online". Morning Edition. NPR.
- Leo, Alexandra (April 26, 2006). "Web Site Offers Advice From Elders". ABC News.
- Stich, Sally (October 22, 2006). "Online Wisdom". Time.
- Lorimer, Nicole (August 24, 2007). "Wisdom on the Web". Guideposts.
