= Earth Watchers Center =

Organization

- Abbreviation: EWC
- Formation: September 2002
- Purpose: To help reduce the existing environmental problems and to preserve the Earth’s heritage through raising public awareness
- Location: Iran

Earth Watchers Center (EWC) is a non-profit environmental organization in Iran which has been functioning since September 2002.

EWC's aim is to help reduce the existing environmental problems and to preserve the Earth's heritage through raising public awareness.

The EWC's motto is Information → Awareness → Conservation.

== A summary of EWC's activities ==
- Book writing and publication concerning forests in the north of Iran (values and threats) named "At The Threshold Of Bidding Farewell To Ancient North Forests". This book was selected as the best book of the year among 100 books concerning environmental matters focusing on the environmental issues in 2004 by Mehrgan Institute.
- Attending different Environmental fairs and being selected as the "top Iranian non-profit environmental organization in 2005".
