= Yueh Chai-chun =

Yueh Chai-chun (Chinese: 乐茞军; born 1932), known by her pen name Madame Wei Wei (Chinese: 薇薇夫人), is a Taiwanese newspaper columnist and television host. Her long-running column in the United Daily News, starting in 1965, dispensed advice to Taiwanese women as they navigated a changing society.

== Early life and education ==
Yueh Chai-chun (乐茞军), also sometimes romanized as Lo Chai-chun, was born in 1932 in what was then Wan state, China.

She attended Anhui Normal University. At age 18, in 1949, she left for Taiwan for what was intended as a brief stay to train with the Young Women's Work Brigade. But she remained permanently after the Chinese Communist Revolution sent the Nationalists to the island.

In Taiwan, Yueh married and had three children. She also found work at a hospital's design department.

== Career ==
Yueh began writing in her spare time and submitting articles to local publications. Her first piece was published in the United Daily News supplement in 1964.

She quickly became a prolific columnist under the pen name Madame Wei Wei (薇薇夫人). Her eponymous daily column in the United Daily offered advice for women dealing with the complexities of modern life. She was one of the first women to write an advice column in Taiwan.

Her column has been described as "enormously popular" in her home country, and she became a household name. She was chosen to represent Taiwan abroad, even traveling to the United States and meeting with fellow advice columnist Ann Landers. Yueh's popularity continued for several decades, and she adapted her advice to the changing times and shifting expectations of women.

In the 1970s, she also began to appear as a host of the morning show Today, which she went on to produce. She also wrote for other publications, including the World Journal and the Mandarin Daily News, the latter of which she later directed until her retirement in 1997. Over the course of her career, she has published several books.
