= Mrs Mills Solves all Your Problems =

Satirical agony aunt magazine column

Mrs. Mills Solves all Your Problems is a popular, satirical and fictional agony aunt column in The Sunday Times Style magazine, in which readers write or email Mrs Mills and she replies with exceptionally bad advice. Examples include -"get a new best friend"- or "she is obviously sleeping with your husband". She is currently depicted as an attractive, stylish, glamorous, brunette (later raven-haired), forty-something year old woman but was previously drawn as an older, more prudish woman. She receives many pleas for advice each week.

== Further publications ==
A book has been released by the Sunday Times of her most notable responses, and is available from their website.
