= Express Written Consent =

- Genre: Talk show
- Presented by: Jeremy Brisiel (JB)
- Country of origin: United States
- Original language: English

Production
- Camera setup: Multiple
- Running time: Various
- Production company: MLB.com

Original release
- Network: MLB.com
- Release: 2012 – present

Express Written Consent is an American talk show produced by MLB.com and hosted by Jeremy Brisiel (JB) that takes place in Major League Baseball ballparks. Guests have been actors, musicians, athletes, writers and other celebrities. With a baseball game as the backdrop, conversations often reveal the guests' connection to baseball - their favorite baseball memory, favorite teams or favorite players. Guests also discuss their craft and current projects as they do on traditional talk shows. Occasionally, guests have done play by play as themselves or in the voice of their most famous characters. The show relies on a unique environment and friendly games to reveal new facets of each guest.

== EWC Games ==
Start, Bench, Cut is a game JB plays that creates a lighthearted but difficult decision for the guest. Similar to another parlor game, the guest is given a personalized list of three things - usually something personal, like characters they've played, musicians they like, or favorite ball players - and the guest has to Start one, Bench one and Cut one. Whatever is 'Started' is in the lineup every day. Whatever is 'Benched' is available for the lineup occasionally. Whatever is 'Cut' is sent far away and has no part in the future.

3 Up 3 Down is another game JB plays with the guest which is a word association game. The guest is given 9 baseball terms and then asked 3 questions. They must answer with one of the 9 baseball terms that they've been given.

Other games that have been played on the show: Spiderman Villain or Baseball Player?, and Economist or Baseball Player?.
