= European Wax Center =

American chain of hair removal salons

- Logo used since 2026
- Type: Private
- Industry: Personal care, Franchising
- Founded: 2004; 22 years ago
- Founders: Joshua Coba; David Coba
- Headquarters: Plano, United States
- Number of locations: 1,047 (2026)
- Area served: United States
- Products: Skin care
- Services: Waxing
- Owner: General Atlantic
- Website: waxcenter.com

European Wax Center (EWC) is an American chain of hair-removal centers specializing in professional Waxing services and related skincare products. Founded in Aventura, Florida, in 2004 by siblings Joshua and David Coba, the company is headquartered in Plano, Texas, and operates primarily through franchised locations. As of January 2026, European Wax Center operated 1,047 centers across 44 U.S. states, of which 1,042 were franchise-operated.

The company offers facial and body waxing services and sells proprietary skincare and post-wax products. European Wax Center received an investment from General Atlantic in 2018 and completed an initial public offering on the Nasdaq stock exchange in 2021 under the ticker EWCZ. In May 2026, General Atlantic completed its acquisition of the remaining publicly held shares of the company, returning European Wax Center to private ownership.

== History ==
European Wax Center was founded in 2004 by brothers Joshua and David Coba, who opened the company's first location in Florida. The brothers began franchising the concept in 2008.

By 2015, the company had expanded to 500 locations in the United States, and by 2018, its network had grown to more than 685 centers. In August of that year, investment firm General Atlantic made a strategic investment in European Wax Center. David P. Berg was appointed chief executive officer later that year, succeeding co-founder David Coba.

In 2019, European Wax Center relocated its corporate headquarters from South Florida to Plano, Texas, consolidating operations previously based in Florida and New York City. The relocation brought more than 100 corporate positions to the Dallas area.

In August 2021, European Wax Center completed an initial public offering and began trading on the Nasdaq Global Select Market under the ticker symbol EWCZ. The offering priced 10.6 million shares at $17 per share.

The company opened its 1,000th center in Louisville, Kentucky, in July 2023. That year, David Willis succeeded Berg as chief executive officer, while Berg became executive chairman. Berg returned to the chief executive role in August 2024 before being succeeded in January 2025 by Chris Morris, who also became chairman of the board.

In February 2026, General Atlantic agreed to acquire the European Wax Center shares it did not already own for $5.80 per share in cash. The transaction, which had an implied enterprise value of approximately $640 million, was completed in May 2026. European Wax Center subsequently ceased trading on Nasdaq and became privately held.

== Business and Operations ==
European Wax Center operates primarily through a franchise model. As of January 3, 2026, the company had 1,047 centers across 44 U.S. states, including 1,042 franchised centers and five corporate-owned locations. The network was operated by 172 franchisees, of whom 120 operated multiple European Wax Center locations.

Under its franchise agreements, European Wax Center licenses its trademarks and operating system to independently owned centers and provides franchisees with training, pre-opening assistance, and ongoing operational support. The company also assists with site selection and development, marketing, and center operations. Its franchise-support structure includes field trainers and franchise business consultants who provide coaching, training, and performance guidance to franchise locations.

Waxing services are performed by licensed estheticians whom European Wax Center refers to as "Wax Specialists." In addition to applicable professional licensing requirements, Wax Specialists are required to complete the company's proprietary training program before performing services. European Wax Center's 2026 annual filing describes an intensive six-day initial training program, followed by continuing education and center-level training intended to standardize service delivery across the franchise network.

== Services and Products ==
European Wax Center offers body and facial waxing services, including brow, underarm, leg, back, chest, bikini, and Brazilian waxing, across its network of centers. The company states that its services are offered to guests of different genders and body types.

The company uses a proprietary hard wax marketed as Comfort Wax. Independent coverage from Men's Health has described Comfort Wax as the company's hard, stripless wax used during waxing services. It also develops proprietary skincare and post-wax products under its TREAT and SLOW lines, including products for exfoliation, moisturization, and ingrown-hair care. Esquire has independently described European Wax Center's pre- and post-wax skincare range, including exfoliants, moisturizers, and serums.

Several European Wax Center products have received recognition from beauty and grooming publications. The company's Brightening Ingrown Hair Wipes were named Best Ingrown Hair Treatment in the 2024 Esquire Grooming Awards and Best Ingrown Treatment in the 2024 Men's Health Grooming Awards, and were named Best Ingrown Hair Treatment in the 2025 NewBeauty Awards.

== Awards and Recognition ==
European Wax Center has received recognition for its franchise operations, workplace, and skincare products. Entrepreneur has included the company in its annual Franchise 500 rankings, including a first-place ranking in the waxing category. The company has also received Great Place to Work certification and was named among Fortune's Best Workplaces in Texas.

Products from European Wax Center's skincare range have received recognition from beauty and grooming publications, including Cosmopolitan, ELLE, Esquire, Men's Health, and NewBeauty. Its Brightening Ingrown Hair Wipes were included in Cosmopolitan's 2024 Holy Grail Beauty Awards, Esquire's 2024 Grooming Awards, and Men's Health's 2024 Grooming Awards. ELLE named the company's Ingrown Hair Serum its Best Ingrown Serum for Waxers in a 2024 editorial roundup, and NewBeauty has also recognized products from the company's skincare range.

== Corporate Responsibility ==
European Wax Center has reported efforts to reduce the environmental impact of its product packaging and operations. In its 2023 ESG report, the company said that 28 products used fully recyclable packaging and described additional waste-reduction measures in shipping and electronic-device recycling. The company is also listed by PETA as cruelty-free.

European Wax Center's community initiatives include partnerships with the National Domestic Violence Hotline through its "(Re)Build" program and with Beauty Changes Lives to fund scholarships for esthetics and cosmetology students and company associates.

European Wax Center also established a diversity, equity and inclusion council in 2020 and has reported initiatives related to workforce training, disability inclusion, and accessibility in its centers and digital services.
