= A Bintel Brief =

"A Bintel Brief" was a Yiddish advice column, starting in early 20th century New York City, that anonymously printed readers' questions and posted replies. The column was started by Abraham Cahan, the editor of Der Forverts (The Forward), in 1906. Recent Jewish immigrants, predominantly from Eastern Europe, asked for advice on various facets of their acculturation to America, including economic, family, religious and theological difficulties. In Yiddish, bintel means "bundle" and brief means a "letter" or "letters".

It was a part of some people's lives to such an extent as are radio and television today. It has been the subject of books, essays, a graphic novel and a Yiddish play. Much as "to Xerox" could be described as a commoditization of a trademarked name, the term "A Bintel Brief" has been known to be used as a generic description.

The original printed Yiddish format, which The New York Times described as "homespun advice .. which predated Dear Abby," continued at least until 1970. The column is still published weekly on The Forward's website. In July 2021, The Forward launched a podcast version of A Bintel Brief which returned for a second 10-episode season in 2022.

== History ==
The column began as a response to a January 1906 letter-to-the-editor requesting assistance, which he published under the name "Bintel Brief" (a bundle of letters). The range of topics was described as "from tough bosses to rough neighborhoods, from dating to marriage to love."

Readers and the column shared the goal and "belief that a newspaper could ease" the pain.

The focus of the Jewish Daily Forward's Bintel Brief column was "every aspect of the immigrant experience." The goal was "Americanization." Just as immigrants needed direct help from others, there was also a need for indirect help: Some letters were written by more literate fellow immigrants, not always for free. The concept is Biblical.

== Offline ==
Although leftist, help was freely provided to Jews with beards as readily as with those whose had shaved them off or never had one.

Help was not limited to giving advice, but also "off the page" by

- hosting English language classes
- sponsoring vaccination-day events in the newspaper's lobby
- sending speakers to rallies they publicized regarding Jewish immigration
