= John Dunton =

English bookseller and author (1659–1733)

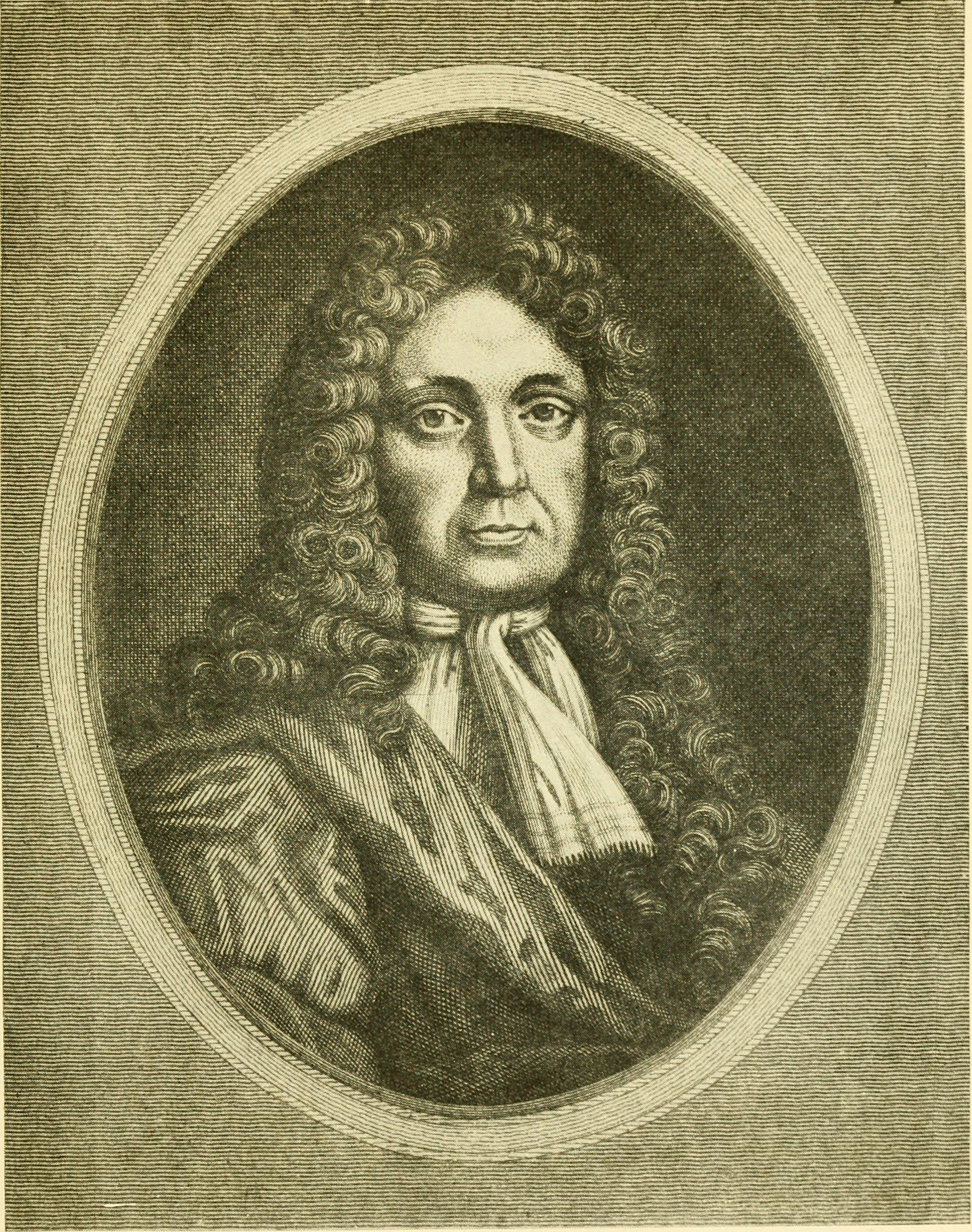
- Portrait of John Dunton
- Born: 4 May 1659; Huntingdonshire, England
- Died: 1733 (aged 73–74)
- Occupations: Bookseller, writer
- Writing career
- Language: English
- Notable works: The Athenian Mercury, The Ladies' Mercury
- Movement: Whig movement

John Dunton (4 May 1659 – 1733) was an English bookseller and writer. In 1691 he founded The Athenian Society to publish The Athenian Mercury, the first major popular periodical and first miscellaneous periodical in England. In 1693, for four weeks, the Athenian Society also published The Ladies' Mercury, the first periodical published that was specifically designed just for women.

== Early life ==
His father, grandfather and great-grandfather were all clergymen. He was born at Graffham, Huntingdonshire, where his father John was rector. The family shortly moved to Ireland, when John Dunton senior became chaplain to Sir Henry Ingoldsby. At the age of fifteen John the son was apprenticed to Thomas Parkhurst, bookseller, at the sign of the Bible and Three Crowns, Cheapside, London. Dunton ran away at once, but was soon brought back, and began to love books.

During the struggle which led to the Glorious Revolution of 1688, Dunton was the treasurer of the Whig apprentices. He became a bookseller at the sign of the Raven, near the Royal Exchange, and married Elizabeth Annesley, daughter of Samuel Annesley, whose sister married Samuel Wesley. His wife managed his business so that he was left free in a great measure to follow his own eccentric devices. He had early success with Thomas Doolittle's The Lord's last-sufferings, the topical Stephen Jay's Daniel in the Den, and a sermon by John Shower.

== In New England ==
In 1686, probably because he was concerned in the Monmouth Rebellion, he visited New England, where he stayed eight months selling books and observing with interest the new country and its inhabitants. He sailed from Gravesend in October 1685, and reached Boston after a four months' voyage. He sold his books, and visited Cambridge. In Roxbury he saw the missionary John Eliot and learnt something of Native American customs. He stayed for a time at Salem and Wenham, and returned to England in the autumn of 1686.

Dunton had become security for his brother's debts, and to escape the creditors he made a short excursion to Holland.

== Later life ==
On his return to England, he opened a new shop in London in the Poultry, in the hope of better times. Here, he founded in 1691 a new kind of journal, The Athenian Gazette/The Athenian Mercury, with anonymous questions-and-answers, powered by his Athenian Society. His wife died in 1697, and he married a second time; but a quarrel about property led to a separation; and being incapable of managing his own affairs, he spent the last years of his life in great poverty.

== In literature ==
Dunton received a rather backhanded compliment from Jonathan Swift in the latter's A Tale of A Tub (see p. 38 of text in 1st edition of 1704).

Dunton both complimented and derided his contemporary Ned Ward, praising him as 'truly born a poet, not made, not form'd by industry' but also criticized him as 'a hardened impudent rake' when Dunton mistakenly thought Ward ridiculed him in print.

== Works ==
He gave an account of his travels around Ireland in Teague Land: or A Merry Ramble to the Wild Irish (1698). He gave an interesting view of the workings of the Irish Courts and brief sketches of the Irish judges, whom he praised in general as "men of whom no one complains". He was impressed by their learning: in particular, he thought that Sir Henry Echlin was one of the great book lovers of his time, owning a "very large and curious library". He had an equally high opinion of Echlin's colleague Thomas Coote, another noted bibliophile.

He wrote several books whose titles are today among specialists better known than their contents, ranging from The informer's doom, or, An unseasonable letter from Utopia directed to the man in the moon giving a full and pleasant account of the arraignment, tryal, and condemnation of all those grand and bitter enemies that disturb and molest all kingdoms and states throughout the Christian world (1689) to his Bumography: or, A touch at the lady's tails, being a lampoon (privately) dispers'd at Tunbridge-Wells, in the year 1707. By a water-drinker. With the names and characters of the most noted water-drinkers. Also, a merry elegy upon Mother Jefferies, the antient water-dipper (1707).

19th- and 20th-century criticism neglected Dunton because of his tendency to use the public for his private businesses. Both his quarrels as a publisher and as a husband were more than reflected in his publications. He would thus offer Reflections on Mr. Dunton's leaving his wife. In a letter to himself. (1700?) followed by the public proclamation of his reunion with his wife, while at the same moment he would portray himself as a lover of privacy with his The art of living incognito being a thousand letters on as many uncommon subjects, written by John Dunton during his retreat from the world, and sent to that honourable lady to whom he address'd his conversation in Ireland (1700).

His accounts of quarrels he had as a book trader and publisher offer information to book historians dealing with the period. Important titles are here his Religio bibliopolae in imitation of Dr. Browns Religio medici (1691), his The Dublin scuffle being a challenge sent by John Dunton, citizen of London (1699) and his Life and Errors of John Dunton (1705). His letters from New England were published in the U.S. in 1867.

He also wrote the first periodical and the first dictionary designed specifically for women: The Ladies' Mercury—an imitation of his wider Athenian project—and acting here as the publisher more than the author: The ladies dictionary, being a general entertainment of the fair-sex, a work never attempted before in English (1694).

- The informer's doom, or, An unseasonable letter from Utopia directed to the man in the moon: giving a full and pleasant account of the arraignment, tryal, and condemnation of all those grand and bitter enemies that disturb and molest all kingdoms and states throughout the Christian world. London: Printed for John Dunton, 1683.
- The amazement of future ages, or, This swaggering world turn'd up-side down London: printed for John Dunton, 1684. Partly reprinted in 106 copies in 1926.
- Religio bibliopolæ: in imitation of Dr. Browns Religio medici, with a supplement to it London: Printed for P. Smart ..., and are to be sold at the Raven, 1691.
- N. H. The ladies dictionary, being a general entertainment of the fair-sex: a work never attempted before in English London: Printed for John Dunton, 1694.
- The Dublin scuffle : being a challenge sent by John Dunton, citizen of London, to Patrick Campbel, bookseller in Dublin. London: (Printed for the author) and are to be sold by A. Baldwin ... and by the booksellers in Dublin, 1699.
- The art of living incognito : being a thousand letters on as many uncommon subjects London: Printed (for the author), and are to be sold by A. Baldwin, 1700.
- The Post-Angel, or Universal Entertainment. A monthly journal edited by John Dunton, 1701–1702.
- The life and errors of John Dunton : late citizen of London; written by himself in solitude. With an idea of a new life; wherein is shewn how he'd think, speak, and act, might he live over his days again London: printed for S. Malthus, 1705. vol. 1 1818 reprint vol.2 1818 reprint
- Bumography : or, a touch at the lady's tails, being a lampoon (privately) dispers'd at Tunbridge-Wells, in the year 1707. By a water-drinker. With the names and characters of the most noted water-drinkers. Also, a merry elegy upon Mother Jefferies, the antient water-dipper London : [s.n.], [printed in the year MDCCVII].
- The Athenian Oracle abridged at Google Books

- vol. I: 1st edition (1703), 2nd edition (17??), 3rd edition (1728)
- vol. II: 1st ed. (1703), 2nd ed. corr. (1704), 3rd ed. (1728)
- vol. III: 1st ed. (1704), 2nd ed. (1706), 3rd ed. (1728)
- vol. IV: 1st edition (1710), 2nd edition (17??), 3rd ed. (1728)
