= Frederick James Jobson =

Methodist minister, painter and architect (1812–1881)

The Reverend Frederick James Jobson
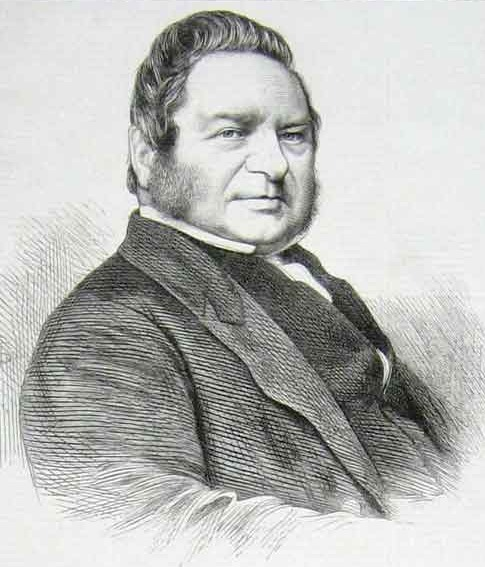
- Rev F. J. Jobson D.D. (Illustrated London News, 1869)

President of the Methodist Conference
- In office 1869–1870
- Preceded by: Samuel Romilly Hall
- Succeeded by: John Farrar

Personal details
- Born: 6 July 1812 Essex
- Died: 4 January 1881 (aged 68) London
- Occupation: Painter, Architect, Author, and Wesleyan Methodist Minister
- Known for: President of the Wesleyan Methodist Conference (UK), and Treasurer of the Wesleyan Methodist Foreign Mission Society
- Nickname: F.J. Jobson

Rev. Frederick James Jobson D.D. (6 July 1812 – 4 Jan 1881) - commonly styled F. J. Jobson - painter, architect and Wesleyan Methodist minister, became President of the Methodist Conference in 1869, and Treasurer of the Wesleyan Methodist Foreign Mission Society, 1869–1882. Alongside his important role in encouraging Methodist architecture, he was the author of devotional, architectural, biographical and travel books - which, combined with his role superintending the Wesleyan Methodist Magazine for over a decade and related duties - led to a great expansion of Methodist publishing. His topographical paintings provide a further legacy.

== Early life ==
F. J. Jobson, son of John Jobson and Elizabeth Caborn (b. 20 November 1786, Beverley), was born in 1812, three years before the end of the Napoleonic wars, while his father was serving in the North Lincoln Militia and his parents were stationed at Essex and elsewhere in England. Brought up in Lincoln, on leaving school he served an apprenticeship to Edward James Willson (1787–1854), architect, antiquary and politician of Lincoln. However, an enthusiasm for the Wesleyan Methodist ministry, led him to retrain, and in 1834 he entered the Wesleyan Methodist ministry as pastor at Patrington, East Riding of Yorkshire. A year later he moved to a chapel in Manchester for a brief period (1835–7) whereupon he was invited to the Isle of Man to give the first Sunday address in the newly opened chapel at Douglas, then on to the City Road Chapel, London, as an assistant minister with circuit work, serving three terms, each of three years at City Road Chapel.

Much of what is known of Jobson's early life, his brothers and sisters, relatives and parentage results from a detailed biographical account of the life and upbringing of his mother, who was major influence on his life. This, he published in 1855, under the title A Mother's Portrait. It provides a first-hand account of early Methodism in Lincoln, in the early nineteenth century. Frederick Jobson recalled, in the book, that it should be remembered that it required some degree of moral heroism to become a Methodist, at the time father and mother joined the Society. I well recollect that when a child at school I was taunted with the name on their account.

== Travels abroad ==
After about twenty years–in May 1856, with Dr. John Hannah–he was sent as one of the representatives of the British Wesleyan Conference, to the Methodist Episcopal Conference at Indianapolis in the USA. While there, he was awarded the honorary degree of D.D.

After his return to Britain, he was sent abroad, by the English Wesleyan Conference - this time to the Australian Wesleyan Conference at Sydney (January 1861), and was accompanied by his wife. During this visit his host was Alexander McArthur. As a keen observer of the places through which this journey took him, he kept a travel diary. On his return to England in 1862, he published this account of his journey under the title, Australia, with Notes by the way of Egypt, Ceylon, Bombay, and the Holy Land. In this he described how, on 18 February, he "crossed the Harbour of the North Shore ... to view from the highest elevation on that side of the water... turning our backs upon this vision of the wilderness ... we had, perhaps the grandest panorama of Sydney that can be obtained from any point of view". His painting of this view became one of several topographical scenes he completed on his trip; a chromolithograph of this view was used with some variations in his book.

In 1866, the death at sea of friends he had met while in Australia - Rev. Daniel James Draper (1810–1866) and his wife - he led him to published an account of their lives and tragedy.

== Architectural interests ==
Before Jobson's travels to America and Australia, he had become a recognised author, and an authority on Nonconformist, and in particular Wesleyan, chapel design. This recognition had been secured following publication of his best-known book, Chapel and School Architecture as Appropriate to the Buildings of Nonconformists Particularly to Those of the Wesleyan Methodists: With Practical Directions for the Erection of Chapels and School-Houses (1850).

In this book he maintained that chapels are not meant to be designed to look like concert halls. He regarded Neo-Gothic with a degree of praise, and adapted its medieval designs to the traditions and needs of nineteenth-century Independent or Nonconformist chapels. Externally, a greater use of brick and design elements not generally acceptable in Anglican Neo-Gothic, could be promoted in the Neo-Gothic of Nonconformist chapels. In this, the Dissenting Gothic style, the central aisle (a key feature of Anglican churches) was ruled out; as was the choir and apse. These and other modifications contributed to simplicity of interior design and internally, the most important focal point was the pulpit as required by dissenting congregations. Due to the presence of women preachers in some Nonconformist chapels (entirely absent from Anglican churches), panels called 'modesty boards' were sometimes introduced into Dissenting Gothic pulpit designs. Seating arrangements took several forms, including sometimes being raised.

Jobson's knowledge of architecture proved particularly useful to him in his relations with the Wesleyans' commissioning around 1850 of a Normal Training College at Westminster; their opening in 1851 of new premises for Wesley's Kingswood School in Bath, Somerset, founded in 1748; and also the Wesleyan Theological Institution, Richmond that opened in 1843 when students transferred from Abney House. All of these constructions, he took an active interest.

== Writing and publications ==
In Britain by 1864, Jobson was appointed to take charge of Methodist publications. He became book steward of the Wesleyan Methodist organisation, and under his management the publishing department was greatly developed, and he superintended the Wesleyan Methodist Magazine for twelve years. During this period, he was elected President of the Wesleyan Methodist Conference (in the late 1860s); and was also appointed Treasurer of the Wesleyan Methodist Foreign Missions Society, 1869–1882. He also took a keen role in the Wesleyan Society for Securing the Repeal of the Contagious Diseases Acts which supported Josephine Butler's crusading work for women.

Besides several devotional works, and published sermons, Jobson was author of:

- Chapel and School Architecture, 1850
- A Mother's Portrait, 1855
- America and American Methodism, 1857
- The Method of Man's Reconciliation With God (with John Hannah), 1857
- The Servant of his Generation... a tribute to Dr Bunting, 1858
- Australia, with notes by the way on Egypt, Ceylon, Bombay and the Holy Land, 1862
- Perfect Love for Christian Believers, 1864
- Serious Truths for Consideration, 1864
- Visible Union with the Church of Christ, 1864
- The Shipwrecked Minister and His Drowning Charge, 1866
- Verbatim Report of the Speeches of Revs. W. M. Punshon...George Osborn...F. J. Jobson...[and others] at the Meeting Held in...the Cannon Street Hotel, on Friday, 5 March 1875 (Wesleyan Society for Securing the Repeal of the Contagious Diseases Acts), 1875.

== Paintings ==
Jobson's watercolour paintings of architectural and topographical scenes include the following examples from his Australian studies:

- "King George's Sound, W. Australia, watercolour 1860".
- "Sydney from the North Shore, watercolour".
- "Plains of Adelaide from Mount Lofty S. Australia, watercolour 1861".
- "Hobart Town, Tasmania, watercolour 1861".
- "Wilson's Promontory, near Sydney towards Melbourne, watercolour".
- "Cape Otway Dec. 13/60, 7½ p.m., watercolour".
- "Clouds at Sea, Indian Ocean, watercolour 1860".
- "Glenelg, S. Australia, on leaving Australia by Balclutha, watercolour 1861".
- "King George Sound, pencil and wash 1860".
- "Sydney from Botany at the Hon. A. McArthur's, Glebe Point, watercolour 1861".

== Death & legacy ==
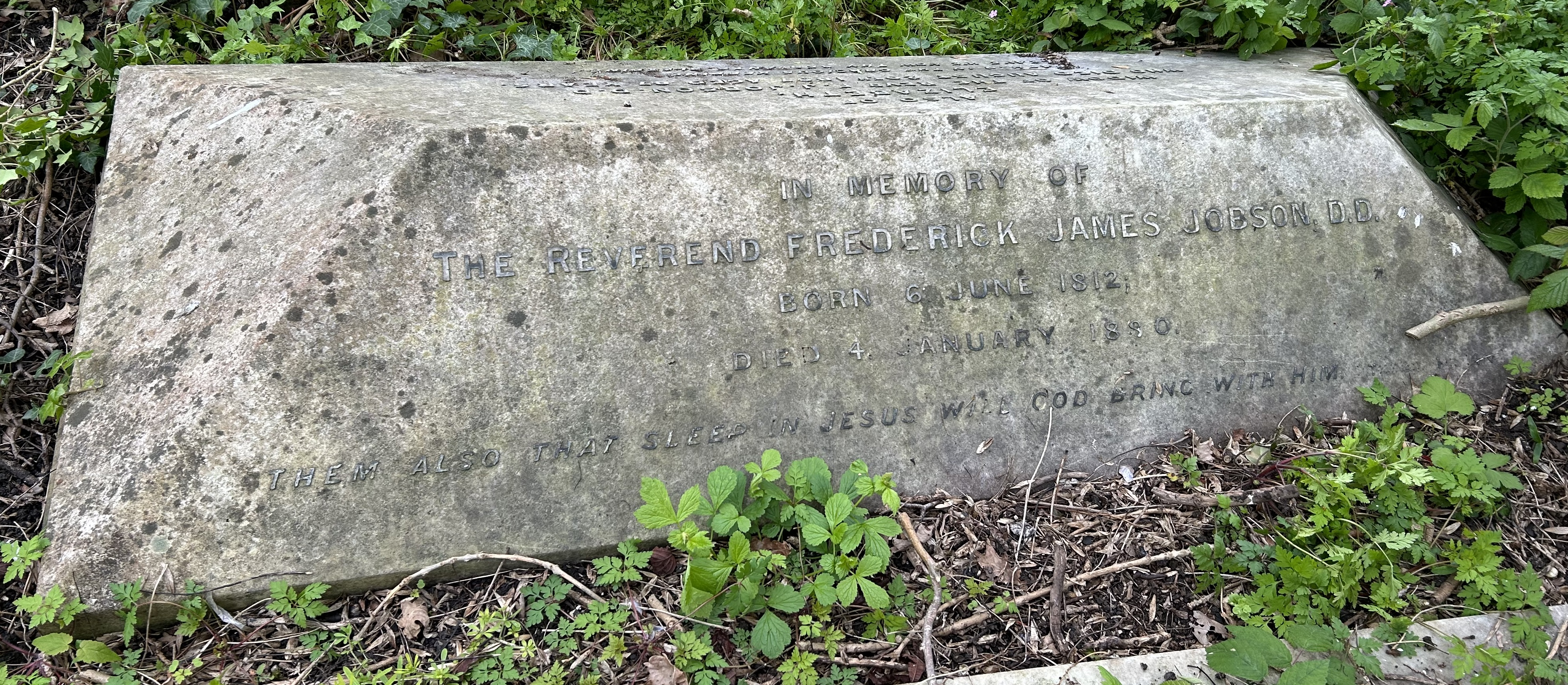
Grave of Frederick James Jobson in Highgate Cemetery

F. J. Jobson died at 21 Highbury Place, Holloway Road, London, on 4 January 1881. His funeral sermon was preached at Wesley's Chapel, London, on 9 February, and he was buried in Highgate Cemetery on 8 January. One biographer described him as a "large hearted and catholic-spirited man, and is the acknowledged friend of prominent men in the Established Church and of non-conformist ministers". A number of his sermons were published in Life of F. J. Jobson by Rev Benjamin Gregory (London: 1884). Further background about his life was published in Recollections of Seventy Years (1888) by the African-American Methodist minister Daniel Alexander Payne D.D. LL.D; and by the Chartist radical and writer Thomas Cooper in his autobiography (dedicated to Frederick Jobson), published in 1857.
