= James Townley (Methodist) =

British Wesleyan minister and author

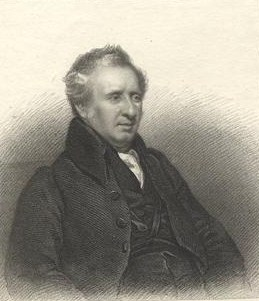

President of the Methodist Conference
- In office 1829–1830
- Preceded by: Jabez Bunting
- Succeeded by: George Morley

Personal details
- Born: 11 May 1774 Manchester
- Died: 12 December 1833 (aged 59)
- Occupation: Minister and author

James Townley (1774–1833) was a Wesleyan minister and author of numerous books.

== Career ==
Son of Thomas Townley, a Manchester tradesman, James Townley was born on 11 May 1774. He was educated by the Rev. David Simpson of Macclesfield. He became a member of the Wesleyan Methodist body in 1790, and a minister in 1796.

In 1822 Townley received the degree of D.D. from the college of Princeton, New Jersey, in recognition of his literary work. From 1827 to 1832 he acted as general secretary of the Wesleyan Methodist Missionary Society, and in 1829 was elected president of the Wesleyan conference, and presided at the Dublin and Leeds conferences. While in Manchester he was a member of a philological society founded by Adam Clarke.

Townley died at Ramsgate on 12 December 1833. He was twice married, to Mary Marsden and Dinah Bull, both of London, and had seven children by his first wife.

== Bibliography ==
Townley, a good preacher and an accomplished linguist, wrote many books.

- Biblical Anecdotes, 1813
- Illustrations of Biblical Literature, exhibiting the History and Fate of the Sacred Writings from the Earliest Times to the Present Century, 1821, 3 vols.
- Essays on various Subjects of Ecclesiastical History and Antiquity, 1824
- The Reasons of the Laws of Moses, from the "More Nevochim" of Maimonides, with Notes, Dissertations, and a Life of the Author, 1827
- An Introduction to the Literary History of the Bible, 1828 (available online at Google Books).

Among his contributions to the Methodist Magazine, besides those included in his volume of Essays, were On the Character of Popery, 1826; Claims of the Church of Rome Examined, 1827; and Ancient and Foreign Missions, a series four articles, published in 1834.
