= Joseph Bradford (preacher) =

British preacher and travelling companion of John Wesley

The Reverend Joseph Bradford
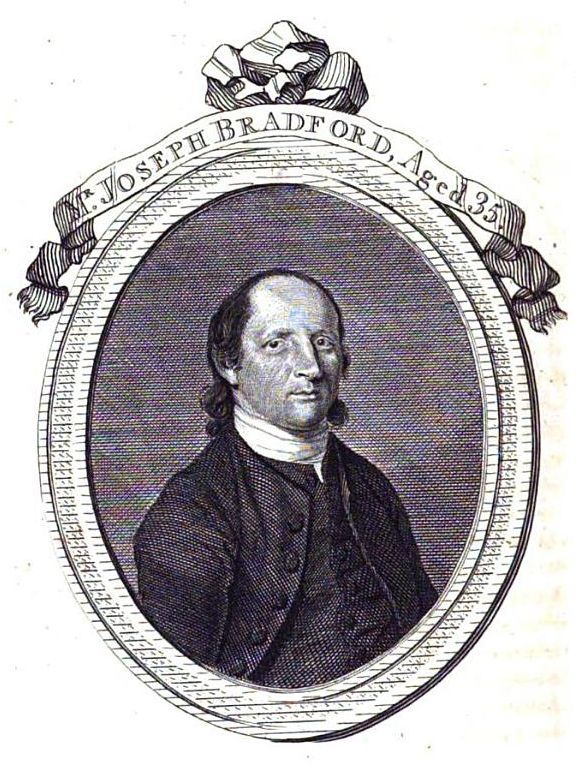
- Joseph Bradford; Arminian Magazine April 1783

President of the Methodist Conference
- In office 1795–1796
- Preceded by: Thomas Hanby
- Succeeded by: Thomas Taylor
- In office 1803–1804
- Preceded by: Joseph Taylor SEN
- Succeeded by: Henry Moore

Personal details
- Born: c. 1748 (Note: Birth date varies as calculated after death from 1741 up to 1752 from marriage documents, but Wesley's publication and a letter written on the death of his wife Mary indicate 1748.) Blandford, Dorsetshire?, England
- Died: 28 May 1808 (aged 67) Hull, England
- Resting place: Holy Trinity Church, Hull.
- Spouse(s): 1-Mary Angell; 2-Elizabeth Turner(née Edwards)
- Occupation: Preacher
- Known for: Companion of John Wesley Methodist movement

Joseph Bradford (c.1748 – 28 May 1808) was a British preacher and travelling companion of John Wesley.

== Life ==
Bradford was John Wesley's travelling companion 1774–1780 and again 1787–1790. Wesley entrusted Bradford with transcribing his Journal and in 1785 also entrusted him with a letter to be read to the Conference after Wesley's death. When Wesley was on his deathbed his friend Joseph Bradford was at his side.

Bradford was twice President of the Methodist Conference in 1795 and 1803. Bradford served as the first governor of Kingswood School from 1795 to 1802.

Bradford suffered a severe paralysing stroke some months before his death in 1808.
