= Atmore =

Atmore may refer to:

Places

- Atmore, Alabama
- Atmore, Alberta

People

- Charles Atmore (1759–1826), English Wesleyan minister
- Harry Atmore (1870–1946), New Zealand politician
