= Edward Strutt =

Edward Strutt may refer to:

- Edward Strutt (missionary) (1853-1911), British Wesleyan missionary to Sri Lanka
- Edward Strutt, 1st Baron Belper (1801–1880), British Liberal Party politician
- Edward Lisle Strutt (1874–1948), soldier and mountaineer, grandson of the above
- Edward Gerald Strutt (1854–1930), agriculturalist and land agent
