= George Thomas Perks =

Reverend George Thomas Perks (29 August 1819–29 May 1877) was an English methodist minister. He co-founded the Methodist Recorder in 1861, and was President of the Wesleyan Methodist Conference in 1873.

== Career ==
He was one of the founders of the Methodist Recorder (first published 4 April 1861), with five other Wesleyan Methodist ministers: James Pond Dunn, Charles Garrett, William Morley Punshon, Gervase Smith and Luke Hoult Wiseman.

Perks was awarded an honorary A.M. degree by the Wesleyan University, Middletown, Connecticut, in 1866. He studied at the Wesleyan Theological Institution (then at Abney House, Stoke Newington) from 1839 to 1842. At the Wesleyan Methodist Conference of 1841, he was recorded as having entered the Wesleyan Ministry in 1840. He was appointed to the Brunswick circuit in Leeds in 1842. After one year there he was appointed to Dalkeith in Scotland. He was ordained at the W.M. Conference at Birmingham in 1844.

He was appointed as one of the secretaries of the Wesleyan Methodist Missionary Society in 1867 (taking over from George Osborn D.D.). He held that position until his death. He was elected Secretary of the Wesleyan Methodist Conference in 1872, and President of the Wesleyan Methodist Conference in 1873.

== Personal life ==
Reverend Perks was born in Madeley, England, as the second-oldest child of William Perks (1781–1831) and Elizabeth née Pearce (c.1795-1828). George Thomas Perks married Mary Dodds in Edinburgh in August 1845. The couple had six daughters and two sons. Their eldest son was Robert William Perks (1849–1934).

== Death ==
Perks died in Rotherham on 29 May 1877. He was buried in Abney Park Cemetery.

A collection of his sermons was published by the Wesleyan-Methodist Book-Room in 1882 under the title: "Sermons on Standard Questions". This collection was compiled by his son Robert William Perks, whose preface to the volume`s 469 pages is dated July 1882.
