= Lord Griffiths =

Lord Griffiths may refer to:

- Hugh Griffiths, Baron Griffiths (1923–2015), British soldier, cricketer and judge
- Leslie Griffiths, Baron Griffiths of Burry Port (born 1942), British Methodist minister and Labour politician
- Brian Griffiths, Baron Griffiths of Fforestfach (born 1941), British economist and Conservative politician
