= Thomas Coke (bishop) =

Bishop of the Methodist Episcopal Church

The Reverend Thomas Coke
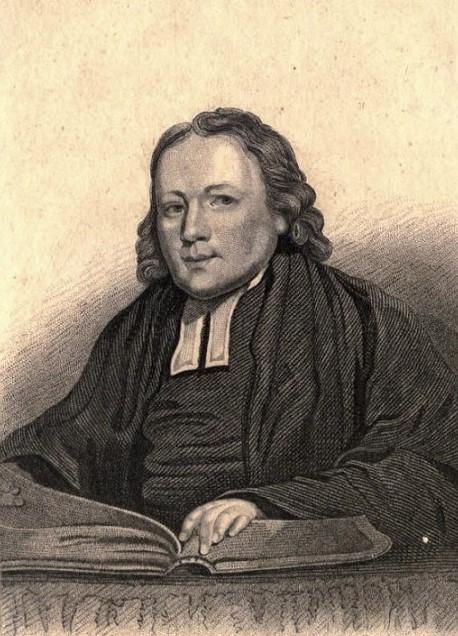

President of the Methodist Conference
- In office 1797–1798
- Preceded by: Thomas Taylor
- Succeeded by: Joseph Benson
- In office 1805–1806
- Preceded by: Henry Moore
- Succeeded by: Adam Clarke

Personal details
- Born: 9 September 1747 Brecon, South Wales
- Died: 2 May 1814 (aged 66)
- Occupation: Methodist bishop

Thomas Coke (9 September 1747 – 2 May 1814) was the first Methodist bishop. Born in Brecon, Wales, he was ordained as a priest in 1772, but expelled from his Anglican pulpit of South Petherton, Somerset, for being a Methodist. Coke met John Wesley in 1776. He later co-founded Methodism in America and then established the Methodist missions overseas, which in the 19th century spread around the world.

== Early life and ordination ==
Born in Brecon, South Wales, his father, Barthomolew, was a well-to-do apothecary. Coke, who was only 5-foot and 1 inch tall and prone to being overweight, read jurisprudence at Jesus College, Oxford, which has a strong Welsh tradition, graduating Bachelor of Arts, then Master of Arts in 1770, and Doctor of Civil Law in 1775. On returning to Brecon he served as mayor in 1772.

In the same year as his mayoralty he was ordained in the Church of England and served a curacy at South Petherton in Somerset. He had already allied himself with the Methodist movement, and this made for trouble when a new rector arrived in the parish. Coke had begun to hold cottage services and open services of the sort promoted by John Wesley. He was dismissed from his post on Easter Sunday 1777, and his parishioners celebrated at the rector's behest by ringing the church bells and opening a hogshead of cider. He returned to Petherton in 1807 and preached to a crowd of 2,000.

== Meeting with John Wesley ==
He met John Wesley in August 1776, becoming one of his closest assistants. Wesley called Coke "the flea" because he seemed always to be hopping around on his missions.

He was appointed Superintendent of the London District in 1780 and President of the Methodist Church in Ireland in 1782 – a function he was to serve many times in the coming decades.

== Early plans for Methodist missions ==
In January 1784, Thomas Parker, "a barrister and able local preacher from York", joined Coke in issuing a "Plan of the Society for the Establishment of Missions among the Heathens" (Coke 2013:48; Vickers 2013:133-135)

== Voyage to America ==
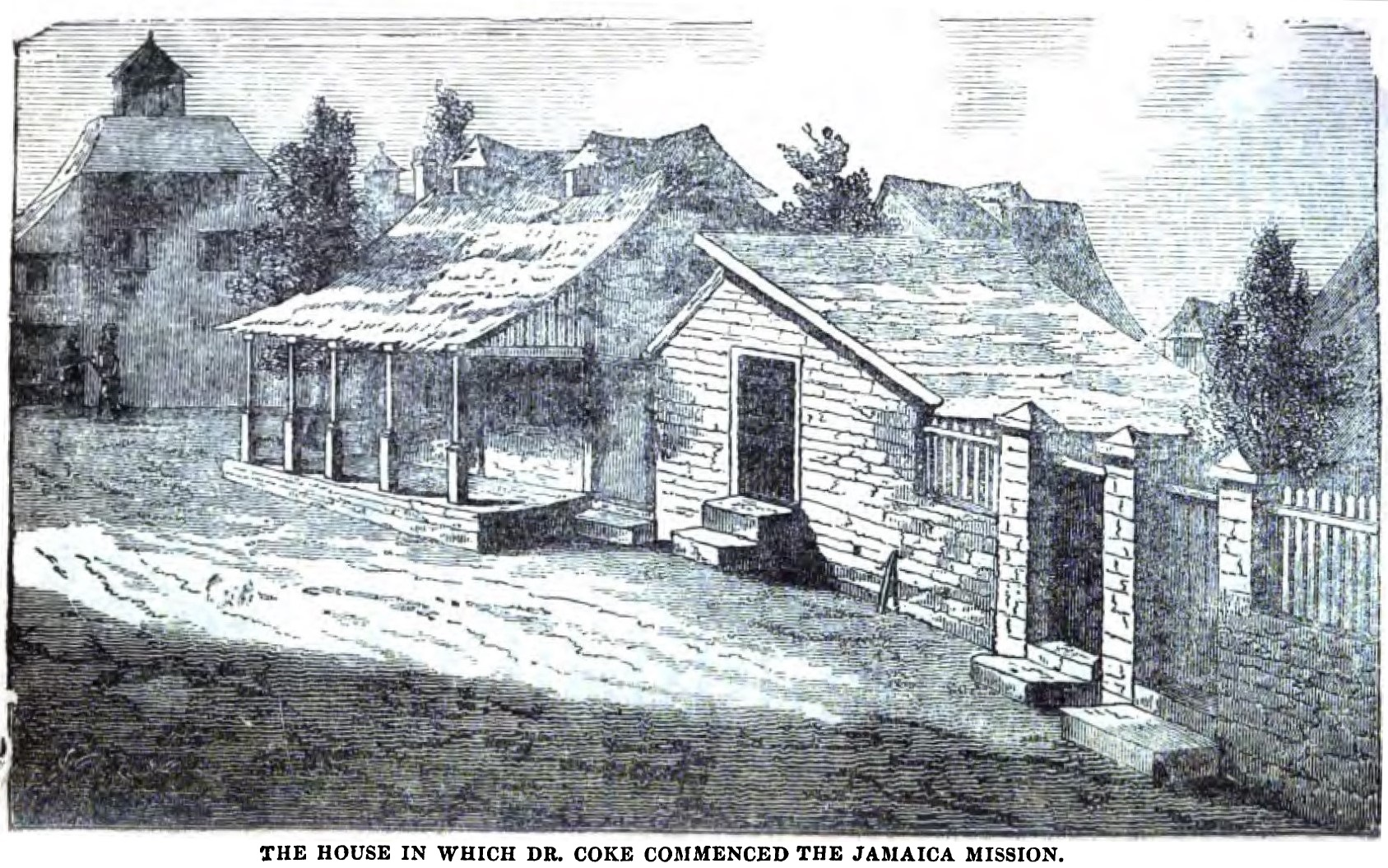
The house in which Dr. Coke commenced the Jamaica Mission (May 1852)

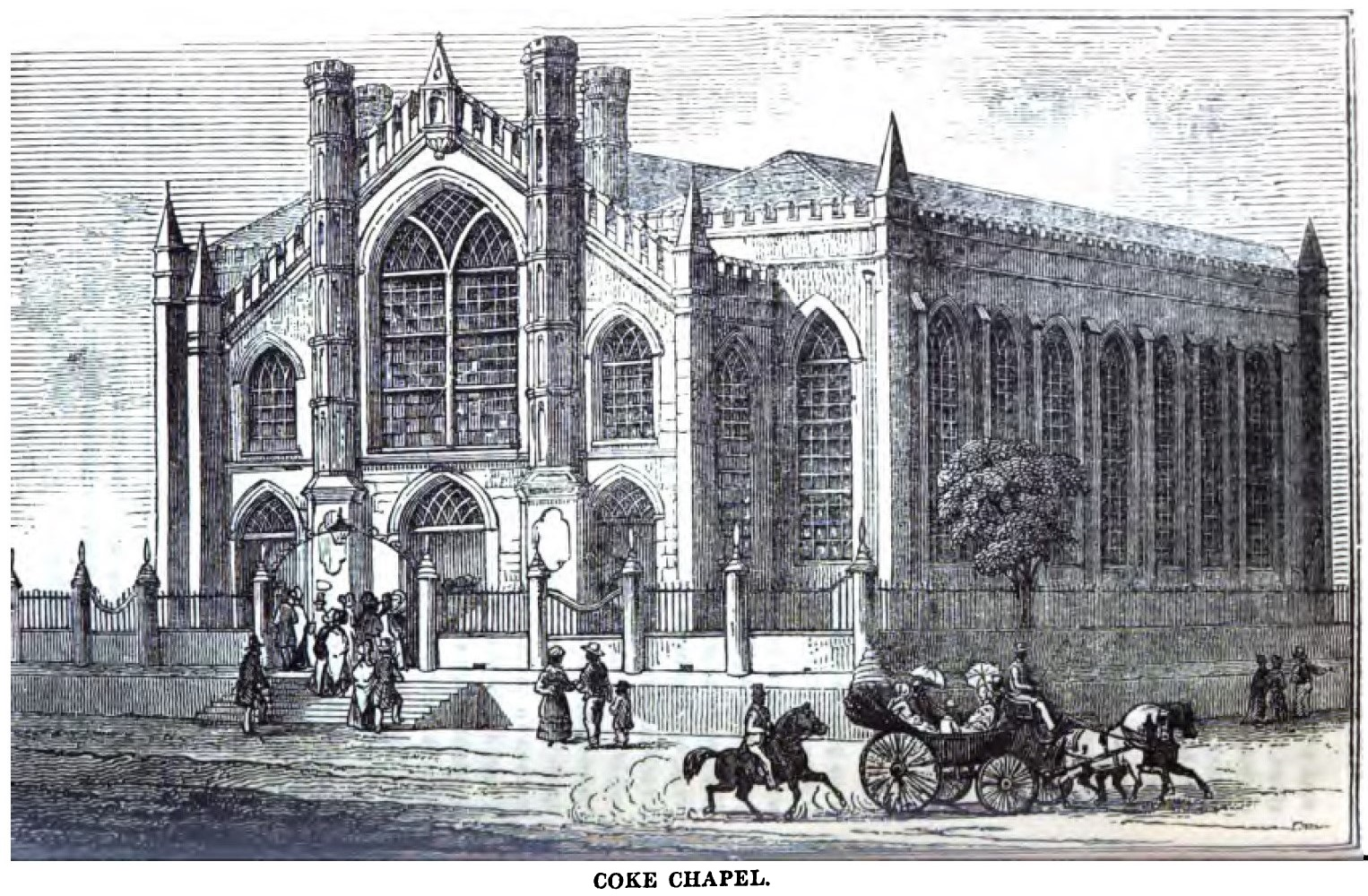
Coke Chapel, Kingston, Jamaica (April 1852)

Following the American Revolution, most of the Anglican clergy who had been in America came back to England. Wesley asked the Bishop of London to ordain some ministers for the New World, but he declined. At this point Wesley still considered only a canonically consecrated bishop capable of conferring Holy Orders. However, in September 1784, in Bristol, Wesley consecrated Coke as Superintendent, a title replaced in 1787 in America by that of Bishop (Greek episkopos) in spite of Wesley's strong disapproval ("superintendent" is etymologically equivalent to episkopos). Since Coke was already a priest (Greek presbuteros) or presbyter in the Church of England, some interpret this consecration as the equivalent of episcopal consecration. Wesley's action took place two months before the consecration in Aberdeen of Samuel Seabury as bishop of the Protestant Episcopal Church of the USA. Coke set sail for New York; during the voyage he read Augustine's Confessions, Virgil's Georgics, biographies of Francis Xavier (Jesuit missionary to India) and David Brainerd (Puritan missionary to North American aboriginals), and a treatise on episcopacy. A conference of Methodist preachers was held at Baltimore, starting on Christmas Day 1784, at which Coke and Francis Asbury were elected superintendents, and the Church was constituted as an independent body under the name of the Methodist Episcopal Church. On 27 December Coke ordained deacons and presbyters and consecrated Asbury as Superintendent; Coke and Asbury are regarded as having been jointly the first superintendents of the Methodist Church in America (the American Methodist Conference formally endorsed the title of Bishop in 1787).

== Other voyages ==
Coke returned to England in June 1785 and made eight further visits to America, his final visit being in 1803. While in America he spoke out against slavery and wrote a letter on the subject to George Washington. Washington met Coke twice and even invited him to preach before Congress. After spending some months travelling throughout Great Britain and Ireland, Coke made his first mission to the West Indies in 1786, making further visits in 1788–89, 1790, and 1792–93.

== Death of Wesley ==
Following Wesley's death in 1791 Coke became Secretary to the British Conference, having been widely supposed to be Wesley's desired successor. He was President of the Conference in 1797 and 1805, on both occasions trying to persuade the Conference to confer on him the official title of Bishop.

== More voyages ==
In the same year he went to Paris and preached in French. He established a mission in Gibraltar in 1803 and then spent five years travelling in the cause of Methodist missions, including visiting Sierra Leone. He promoted others in setting up missions in Canada and Scotland.

== Marriages ==
On 1 April 1805, at the age of 58, Coke married Penelope Goulding Smith, a wealthy woman who happily spent her personal fortune furthering the missions. She travelled with him until her death on 25 January 1811. That same year in December he married for a second time, to Anne Loxdale, and his wife died the following year, 5 December 1812.

== Death of Coke ==
He hoped to open Methodist missions in the East Indies and at his own expense he set sail for Ceylon on 30 December 1813. He had in fact tried to persuade the Prime Minister, Lord Liverpool, to appoint him to an Indian bishopric in the Church of England (the appointment of Church of England bishops being then, as now, a prerogative exercised by the Prime Minister on behalf of the Sovereign). However, Coke died after four months at sea on the way to Ceylon (Sri Lanka). It is thought he died of a "fit of apoplexy," or possibly a stroke. He died aboard ship, located 2 degrees, 29 minutes south latitude, and 59 degrees, 29 minutes east longitude, in the Indian Ocean, where he was also laid to rest.

Asbury described Coke as "a gentleman, a scholar, a bishop to us; and as a minister of Christ, in zeal, in labours, in services, the greatest man in the last century".

== Publications ==
Coke's publications included:

- A Commentary on the Holy Bible: Commentary on the Old Testament. London: Whitfield. 1802.
- A History of the West Indies (3 volumes, 1808–11)
- History of the Bible
- Six Letters in Defence of the Doctrine of Justification by Faith
- Four Discourses on the Duties of a Minister
- Preacher's Manual

He also contributed to Henry Moore's Life of Wesley (1792).

== Memorials ==
In 1828 a monument was erected to his memory in the Priory church in Brecon, (now the Cathedral).

Coke Memorial Methodist Church in South Petherton (where he first served as an Anglican priest) bears his name, as does Coke Memorial Church in Kingston, Jamaica. Dr. Coke's Memorial Schools in Brecon, established in 1870, were destroyed by fire in 1890.

== See also ==
- List of bishops of the United Methodist Church
- Divergence between Anglicanism and Methodism

== Sources ==
- General Commission on Archives and History for The United Methodist Church
- The John Rylands Library: Mr Wesley's Preachers
- Shepherd, Victor (2001). "Chapter 33: Thomas Coke (1747 - 1814)". Witnesses to the Word. Toronto: Clements Pub. ISBN 1-894667-00-X. Archived from the original on 5 February 2007.
- Drew, Samuel (1817). The Life of the Rev. Thomas Coke, LL. D. T. Cordeux.
- "Southwestern University chapel windows". Archived from the original on 29 March 2017.
