= Thomas Taylor (English minister) =

English Wesleyan minister and writer

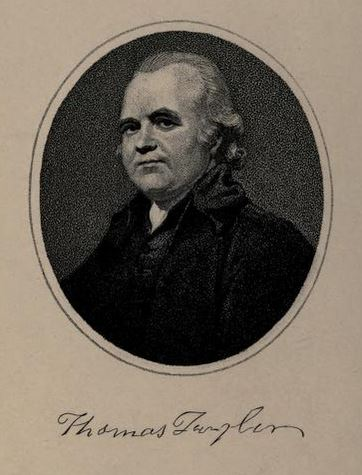

President of the Methodist Conference
- In office 1796–1797
- Preceded by: Joseph Bradford
- Succeeded by: Thomas Coke
- In office 1809–1810
- Preceded by: James Wood
- Succeeded by: Joseph Benson

Personal details
- Born: 11 Nov 1738 Rothwell, West Yorkshire
- Died: 16 October 1816 (aged 77) Bolton, Lancashire

Thomas Taylor (1738–1816), was an English Wesleyan minister and writer, former president of the Wesleyan conference. Taylor was an active colleague of t John Wesley, founder of the Methodist movement.

== Biography ==
Thomas Taylor was the son of Thomas Taylor, a tanner, was born on 11 Nov. 1738 at Royds Green in the parish of Rothwell, Yorkshire. His parents died before he was six years old, and most of his boyhood was passed in an unruly manner. When he was seventeen he heard George Whitefield preach, but the good impression received was not lasting. Three years later he was ‘convinced of sin’, joined the Methodists, and began to preach.

He met John Wesley at Birstall in 1761, and by his advice attended the conference in London that year, when he was appointed the first travelling preacher of the connexion in Wales. A graphic account of his experiences in Glamorganshire and Pembrokeshire, and afterwards in various parts of England, Ireland, and Scotland, is given in his "Autobiography". Like many other early Methodists, he had a full share of hardships and persecutions. He continued an itinerant minister until 1816, a period of fifty-five years.

He was president of the conference in 1796 and 1809. On the former occasion Alexander Kilham, the founder of the "Methodist New Connexion," was expelled from the society. James Everett, in his Wesleyan Takings (p. 345), says of Taylor: "Large in stature, plain features; a useful preacher; natural temper short and peevish, but subdued by divine grace; with a few drawbacks, a fine specimen of the old school." He was a close student, and mastered the original languages of the Bible.

He died on 16 Oct. 1816 at Birch House, near Bolton, Lancashire, the residence of his friend Roger Hollond. Two days previously he had preached at Bolton, and his death inspired James Montgomery to write his poem The Christian Soldier. While at Chester in 1767 he married the descendant of a French Protestant family, by whom he had several children. A portrait of Taylor appeared in the Arminian Magazine for April 1780, and another in Wesley and his Successors, 1891.

== Works ==
In addition to many separate sermons and tracts, he wrote:

- ‘A New Concordance to the Holy Scriptures,’ York, 1782.
- ‘Ten Sermons on the Millennium, and Five on what will Follow,’ Hull, 1789.
- ‘The Hypocrite tried and cast out,’ Liverpool, 1792.
- ‘A Defence of the Methodists who do not attend the National Church,’ Liverpool, 1792.
- ‘History of the Waldenses and Albigenses,’ Bolton, 1793.
- ‘An Answer to Paine's "Age of Reason,"’ Manchester, 1796.
- ‘Sixteen Sermons on the Epistles to the Seven Churches,’ Bristol, 1800.
- ‘The Reconciler, or an humble Attempt to sketch the Doctrine and Discipline of the Church of Christ,’ &c., Liverpool, 1806.

== Notes and references ==
This article incorporates text from a publication now in the public domain: Sutton, Charles William (1885). "Taylor, Thomas (1738-1816)". Dictionary of National Biography. Vol. 55. pp. 467–468.

=== Sources ===
- Kelly, Charles H., ed. (1891). Wesley and His Successors. London: Charles H Kelly. pp. 37–40.
