= Joseph Entwisle =

English Methodist minister

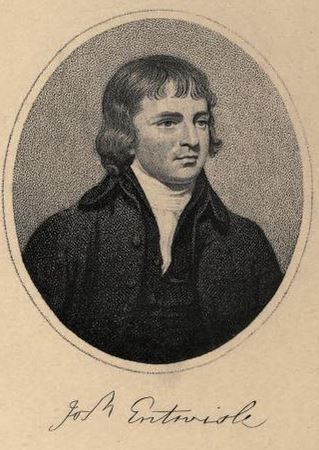

President of the Methodist Conference
- In office 1812–1813
- Preceded by: Charles Atmore
- Succeeded by: Walter Griffith
- In office 1825–1826
- Preceded by: Robert Newton
- Succeeded by: Richard Watson

Personal details
- Born: 15 April 1767 Manchester
- Died: 6 November 1841 (aged 74)
- Occupation: Methodist minister

Joseph Entwisle (1767–1841), was an English Methodist minister.

== Life ==
Entwistle was the second son of William Entwisle and his wife, Ellen Makin, who were members of a presbyterian church in Manchester, and was born there on 15 April 1767, one of five sons who grew up to manhood. He was taught at the free school connected with the old presbyterian chapel in Manchester. At the age of fourteen Entwisle joined the Methodists, and made use of a good library at the preacher's house in Oldham Street. When not quite sixteen he began to preach, and was known as 'the boy preacher.' John Wesley called him out to the itinerant work, and in 1787 sent him to the Oxfordshire circuit. Four years after, at the Manchester conference, he was received into the full ministry while stationed in Halifax.

During the next few years Entwisle laboured in Leeds, Wakefield, Hull, Macclesfield, Manchester, Liverpool, and London, winning apopularity by his preaching power. He was in 1805 appointed the first missionary secretary. The conference of 1812 was held in Leeds, and Entwisle was elected president. Henceforward he filled a leading place in the connexion, and did much to mould its policy and guide its affairs.

The later years of Entwisle's ministry were spent in Bristol, Birmingham, Sheffield, and London, where he was several times reappointed. In 1825 he was elected president of the conference a second time. He ceased to itinerate in 1834, being appointed house governor of the new Theological Institution opened at Hoxton for the education and training of young ministers. Through failure of health he resigned the office four years after, and retired to Tadcaster, where his only daughter lived.

He preached occasionally until within a few days of his death, which occurred on Saturday, 6 November 1841, at the age of seventy-four.

== Works ==
In 1820 he published an 'Essay on Secret Prayer,’ a volume which obtained a large circulation, and was translated into French. He also contributed biographical and practical articles to the Methodist Magazine.

== Family ==
In May 1792 he married Mary Pawson, second daughter of Marmaduke Pawson, farmer, Thorner, near Leeds, by whom he had six children. Two of his sons, Joseph and William, became ministers in the Methodist connexion. While he was in Macclesfield his wife died. When stationed in London he married his second wife, Lucy Hine of Kingsland Crescent, in October 1805.
