= John Bedford (Wesleyan) =

English Wesleyan minister

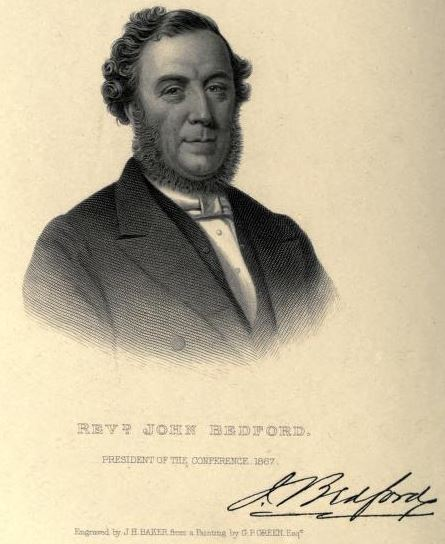

President of the Methodist Conference
- In office 1867–1868
- Preceded by: William Arthur
- Succeeded by: Samuel Romilly Hall

Personal details
- Born: 27 July 1810 Wakefield, West Yorkshire
- Died: 20 November 1879 (aged 69)
- Occupation: Wesleyan minister

John Bedford (27 July 1810 – 20 November 1879) was an English Wesleyan minister.

== Biography ==
He was the son of John and Elizabeth Bedford, a native of Yorkshire, having been born in Wakefield, 27 July 1810. His father died when he was about five years old. John was educated in Wakefield. He studied during several years in a solicitor's office, but, resolving to become a minister of the Wesleyan Methodist Church, he was appointed by the conference in 1831 to Glasgow. There he laboured hard to free the chapels from the heavy debts with which they were encumbered, and by which their growth and development were effectually hindered. In an essay on 'The Constitution and Discipline of British Methodism' he showed his mastery of the principles of church government. Although Bedford's ministry was afterwards mainly exercised in Manchester and adjacent towns, he also laboured with conspicuous success for a period of three years in each of the towns, Birmingham, West Bromwich, and Derby.

In 1860 Bedford was appointed by the conference secretary to the general chapel committee, and thenceforward lived in Manchester. His orderly habits were of immense service in administering the chapel affairs of the connection. He would tolerate nothing loose or irregular, and spared no pains to place the trust property of the Wesleyan Methodist Church on a secure basis. At the same time he kept abreast of the thought and theology of the day. His sermons were logical and impressive, and he especially excelled as a debater.

At the conference of 1858 he was elected into the Legal Hundred to take the place vacated by the death of Jabez Bunting. From that time to the end of his life Bedford was one of the foremost men in his denomination, and his breadth of sympathy enabled him to exert a powerful influence upon the religious world in general. After being one of the secretaries of the conference for several years, he was in 1867 unanimously elected to the presidency of that assembly. A partial failure of health in 1872 led him to retire from the more onerous duties of his secretaryship, but he continued to give valuable counsel on chapel affairs and in other departments until his death. He died at Chorlton-cum-Hardy, near Manchester, 20 November 1879, aged 69.

He published some occasional sermons and speeches, and also a controversial correspondence with the Rev. William Sutcliffe on the doctrine and system of the Wesleyan Methodists, which he very ably defended. He married Maria Gledhill of Brighouse, in 1835, who, with two sons, survived him.
