= William Thompson (Methodist) =

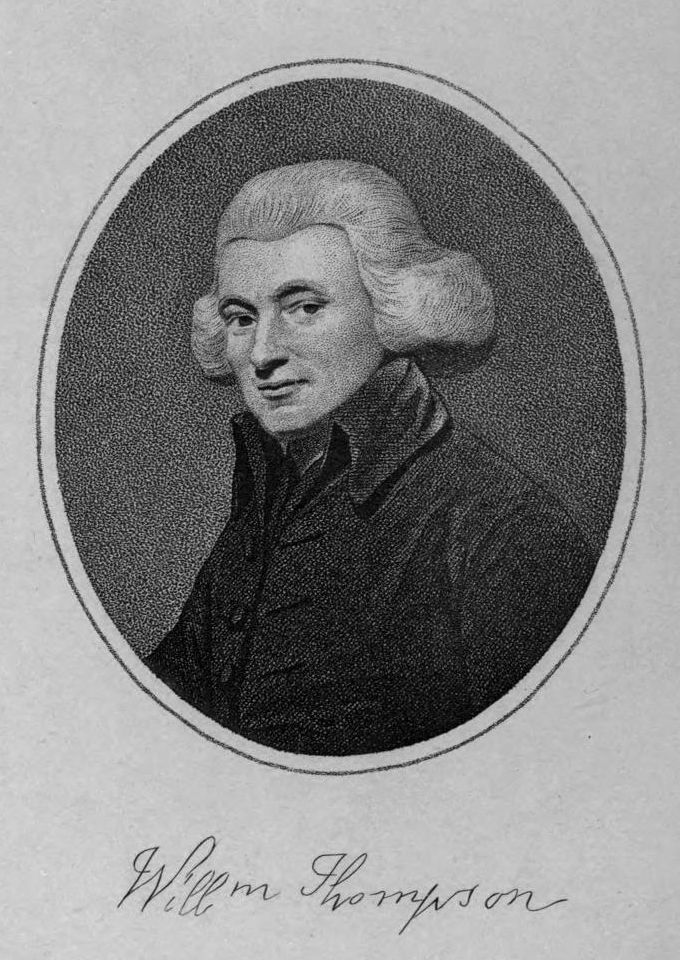

President of the Methodist Conference
- In office 1791–1792
- Preceded by: John Wesley
- Succeeded by: Alexander Mather

Personal details
- Born: 1733 Newtownbutler, Ireland
- Died: 1 May 1799 (aged 65–66) Birmingham
- Known for: First President of the Methodist Conference after Wesley

William Thompson (1733–1799) was the first President of the Methodist Conference after John Wesley's death, being elected President at the Manchester conference in 1791.

== Life ==
Thompson was born in 1733 at Newtownbutler in County Fermanagh, Ireland. He entered the Wesleyan itinerancy in 1757.

During his early ministry he endured persecution including imprisonment and the impressment of several of his hearers into the Royal Navy. They were subsequently released through the intervention of the Lady Huntingdon.

After his term as President of the Methodist Conference, Thompson was involved with the sacramental controversy of the early 1790s. His pen drafted the Plan of Pacification of 1795, which arose out of disputes between the Methodist societies and the Church of England over the status of travelling preachers and the administration of the sacraments, fomenting their separation.

He was serving as Chairman of the Birmingham District when he died on 1 May 1799.

He was buried at St Mary's Church, Whittall Street, Birmingham (demolished in the late 1920s). A tablet, formerly in that church, and now in St Martin in the Bull Ring, reads:

In memory of the Rev. William Thompson, who was the first President of the Wesleyan Methodist Conference. He died May 1st, 1799, and was buried in the vaults of this Church.
