= Loraine Mellor =

British Methodist Christian minister

The Reverend Loraine Nancy Mellor

President of the Methodist Conference
- In office 24 June 2017 – 30 June 2018
- Vice President: Jill Baker
- Preceded by: Roger Walton
- Succeeded by: Michaela Youngson

Loraine Nancy Mellor is a British Methodist Minister who served as the President of the Methodist Conference from 24 June 2017 to 30 June 2018. She was the Chair of the Nottingham and Derby District of the Methodist Church, having been formally appointed to that position on 1 September 2010. In May 2022 she took up the appointment of Chair of the Cornwall and the Isles of Scilly Methodist District, now the South West Peninsula District, succeeding Steve Wild.

== Early career ==
Before training for the Methodist ministry, Mellor worked for the NHS as a neonatal nurse practitioner, and served as an Acting Director of Nursing and Contracts. She is married to John.

== Ministry ==
Mellor was ordained as a presbyter in 1995. She has served as a minister in Stockport and Warrington circuits. She was the Superintendent of the Warrington Circuit from 2003 until 2010, before becoming a District Chair. As Chair of the Nottingham and Derby District, Mellor had oversight of an area covering the south of both Derbyshire and Nottinghamshire, as well as parts of Leicestershire, Lincolnshire and Staffordshire. She was a member of the Methodist Church's Strategy and Resources Committee. In February 2014, she joined 27 Anglican bishops and other clergy in signing an open letter to Prime Minister David Cameron, criticising his government's welfare reforms.

Mellor was elected as the President of the Conference on 6 July 2016, becoming the President-elect. She took up the post the following year, on 24 June 2017, succeeding Roger Walton. Jill Baker, a former President of Methodist Women in Britain, served as Vice-President with her. Addressing the Methodist Conference, Mellor expressed regret over the declining membership of the church. She stated that the Methodist Church needed to return to its radical roots.

After presiding over the summer sessions of the annual Conference, a president serves a one-year term as head of the Methodist Church. On 17 July 2017, she met Archbishop of Canterbury Justin Welby at Lambeth Palace.

Methodist Church titles
Preceded by Roger Walton	President of the Methodist Conference; 2017–2018	Succeeded by Michaela Youngson
