= Henry Moore (biographer) =

English Wesleyan minister and biographer

Reverend Henry Moore

President of the Methodist Conference
- In office 1804–1805
- Preceded by: Joseph Bradford
- Succeeded by: Thomas Coke
- In office 1823–1824
- Preceded by: Adam Clarke
- Succeeded by: Robert Newton

Personal details
- Born: 21 Dec 1751 Drumcondra, Dublin
- Died: 27 April 1844 (aged 92) Brunswick Place, City Road
- Resting place: City Road Chapel
- Spouse(s): 1-Anne Young; 2-. Hind
- Occupation: Minister, biographer
- Known for: Companion of John Wesley Methodist movement

Henry Moore (1751–1844) was an English Wesleyan minister and biographer of Wesley and several early Methodists..

== Life ==
Moore was born in a suburb of Dublin and apprenticed to a wood carver.

Impressed by the preaching of John Wesley, he frequented the Methodist meetings and joined a class in Dublin in 1777. He served from 1784 to 1786 as assistant traveling companion and amanuensis to Wesley, and again from 1788 to 1790.

Wesley made him one of his literary executors and appointed him to be, after his death, one of the 12 ministers to regulate the services of City Road Chapel. He was President of the Methodist Conference in 1804 and 1823. Moore rejected ordainment in the Church of England, although he accepted it from Wesley assisted by two Episcopal clergymen; opposed Thomas Coke's Lichfield scheme of 1794 for the creation of a Methodist hierarchy, and also the proposal brought forward in 1834 for the establishment of a theological school; and on the formation of a centenary fund in 1839 objected to the acquisition of land by the Methodist body.

== Works ==
In conjunction with Coke, and under the authority of the conference, Moore published a Life of the Rev. John Wesley in 1792. A new, more complete, Life was published in 1824-25. His Life was published by Mrs. Richard Smith, with autobiographical content, in 1844. Moore's other works are:

- A Reply to Considerations in the Separation of the Methodists from the Established Church (1794)
- Life and Death of Mrs. Ann Moore (1813)
- Thoughts on the Eternal Sonship (1816)
- The Life of Mrs. Mary Fletcher of Madeley (two volumes, 1817; ninth edition, 1838)
- A Short Account of Mrs. Mary Titherington of Liverpool (1819)
- Sermons (1830), with autobiography to 1791
