= List of presidents of the Methodist Conference =

This is a chronological list of presidents of the Methodist Conference of the Methodist Church of Great Britain and its predecessor churches.

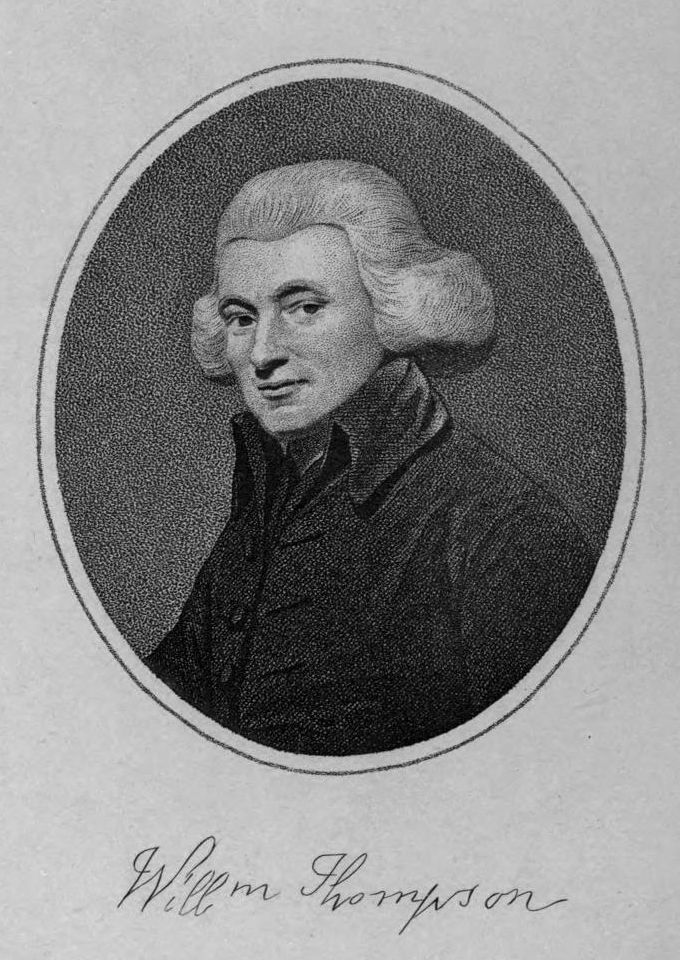
William Thompson was the first President of the Methodist Conference after John Wesley's death.

John Wesley, founder of Methodism, organised and presided over the first Methodist Conference, which was to become the Methodist Church's governing body. This article lists his successors, who are elected by the Conference to serve a one-year term. Presidents follow Wesley's example in travelling extensively across Great Britain, visiting and preaching in local Methodist chapels. Presidents also have an important role representing the Methodist Church in the wider world (most prominently, appearing at the National Service of Remembrance at the Cenotaph in Whitehall).

The first century of British Methodism was characterised by multiple splits from the original Wesleyan Methodist Connexion. Other Methodist branches, such as the Primitive Methodist Connexion, Bible Christian Church and the Methodist New Connexion had their own conferences and presidents. The various branches were re-united in 1932.

== John Wesley and the early conference ==
Methodism traces its roots to the 18th-century Anglican evangelist John Wesley and, to a lesser extent, his brother Charles. The Wesley brothers began an evangelical revival within the Church of England. Over time, John Wesley organised converts locally, founding Methodist "societies", organised into "circuits", and linked in a "connexion". All preachers were in were in connexion primarily with him and thence with each other. John and Charles Wesley, along with four other ministers and four lay preachers, met for consultation in London in 1744. This set a precedent for future conferences; subsequently, the annual conference became the ruling body of the Methodist movement.

In 1773, John Wesley had designated John William Fletcher to be his successor, however he outlived Fletcher. In 1784 Wesley made provision for the governance of Methodism after his death through the Yearly Conference of the People called Methodists. He nominated 100 people and declared them to be its members and laid down the method by which their successors were to be appointed.

Wesley himself was the original president of the Methodist Conference – though Christopher Hopper presided in Wesley's absence at the 1780 conference in Bristol – but after Wesley's death, it was agreed that in the future, so much authority would not be placed in the hands of one man.

The Wesleyan Conference of 1792 laid down that the same person was not to be elected president more than once within an eight-year period. Jabez Bunting and Robert Newton each served four non-consecutive terms in office.

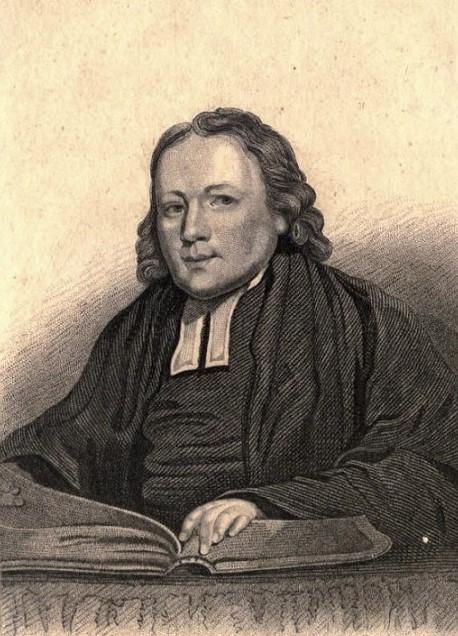
Thomas Coke, twice President of the Conference in 1797 and 1805, was the first Bishop of the Methodist Episcopal Church.

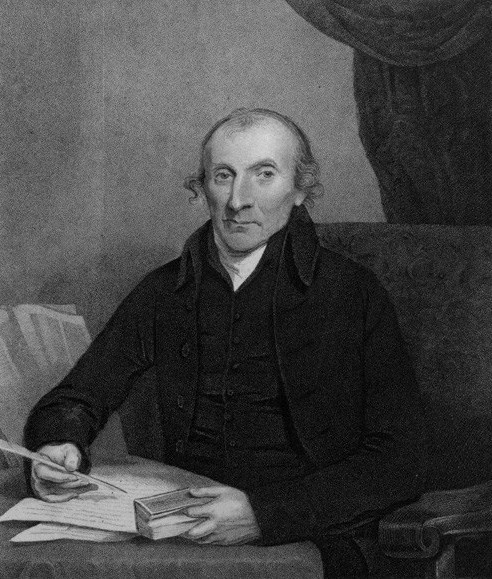
Joseph Benson was elected President twice, in 1798 and 1810.

A list of Wesley's early successors was produced by the Wesleyan Methodist Church, listing all Presidents up to 1890. The My Methodist History website has compiled a list of all Methodist presidents from the 1932 deed of union to 2000, and the My Primitive Methodist Ancestors site has collated the list for the Primitive Methodist presidents from their first conference up to union of 1932. The gap in the Wesleyan records is filled from entries in the Methodist Who's Who of 1912, and the Wesleyan Historical Society's Dictionary of Methodism. The Methodist Church of Great Britain website had a list of presidents (and lay vice-presidents) from 2000 onwards. Additional information on twentieth century Presidents is provided by the Manchester University's Methodist Archives and Research Centre.

== 1791–1819 ==
Year of election	President of Wesleyan Methodist Conference
1791	William Thompson
1792	Alexander Mather
1793	John Pawson
1794	Thomas Hanby
1795	Joseph Bradford
1796	Thomas Taylor
1797	Thomas Coke LL.D
1798	Joseph Benson
1799	Samuel Bradburn
1800	James Wood
1801	John Pawson
1802	Joseph Taylor SEN.
1803	Joseph Bradford
1804	Henry Moore
1805	Thomas Coke LL.D
1806	Adam Clarke M.A LL.D
1807	John Barber
1808	James Wood
1809	Thomas Taylor
1810	Joseph Benson
1811	Charles Atmore
1812	Joseph Entwisle
1813	Walter Griffith
1814	Adam Clarke LL.D
1815	John Barber
1816	Richard Reece
1817	John Gaulter
1818	Jonathan Edmonson M.A
1819	Jonathan Crowther

== 1820–1932: Wesleyans and Primitives ==
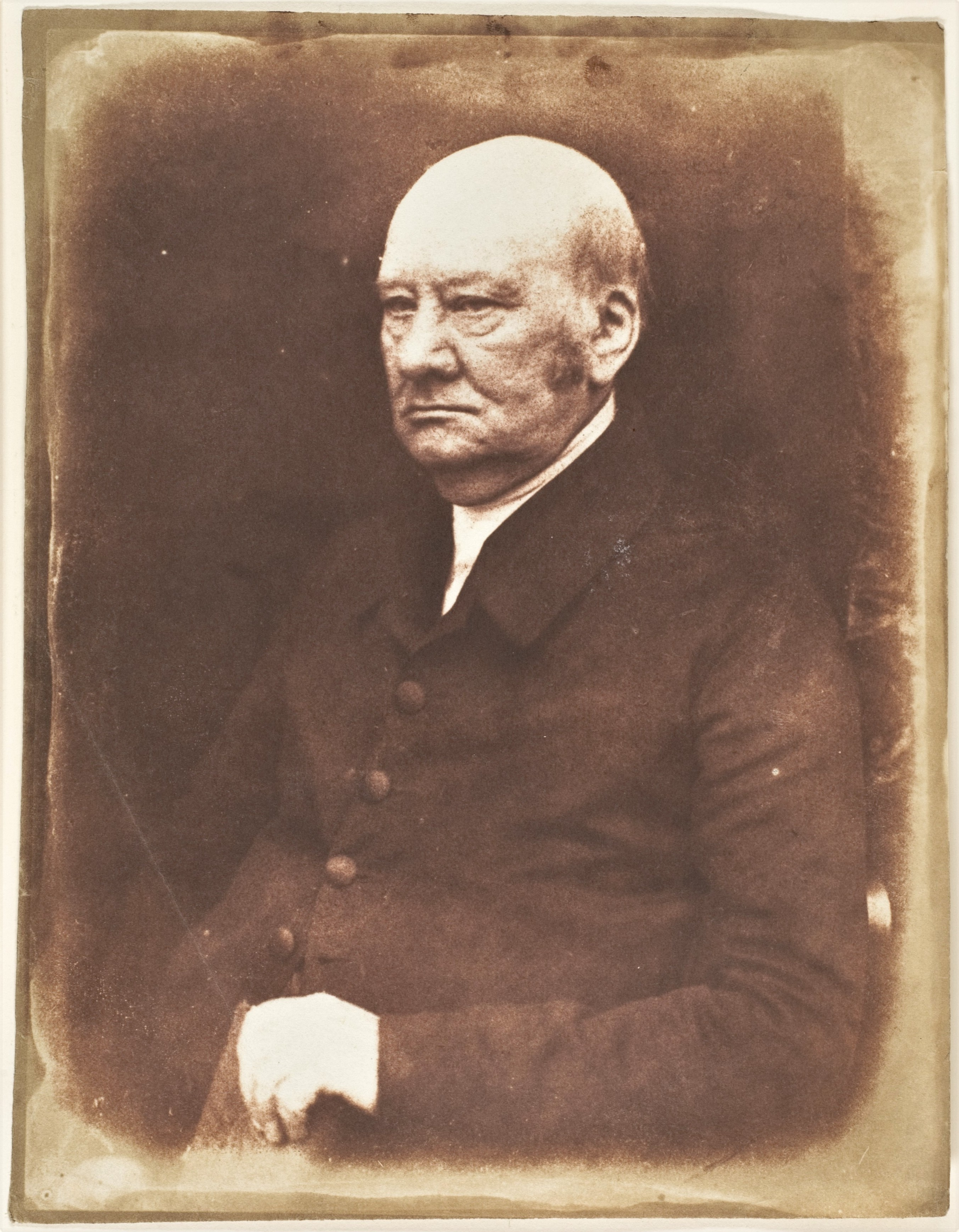
Jabez Bunting was four times chosen to be President

(During the early years of the Primitives' conference the presidents were not recorded, and may have been elected for each day of the conference. A later record indicates that amongst those serving as Primitive Methodist presidents before 1849, there were, in addition to those listed below, Hugh Bourne, William Garner, Thomas Bateman, Joseph Bailey, George Tetley, Sampson Turner.)

Year of election	President of Wesleyan Methodist Conference	President of Primitive Methodist Conference
1820	Jabez Bunting A.M D.D	George Handford
1821	George Marsden	
1822	Adam Clarke LL.D	
1823	Henry Moore	
1824	Robert Newton D.D	
1825	Joseph Entwisle	Thomas King
1826	Richard Watson	James Bourne Esq
1827	John Stephens	
1828	Jabez Bunting A.M.	
1829	James Townley D.D.	James Bourne Esq
1830	George Morley	
1831	George Marsden	
1832	Robert Newton	
1833	Richard Treffry SEN	
1834	Joseph Taylor (2ND)	
1835	Richard Reece	Thomas King
1836	Jabez Bunting D.D	
1837	Edmund Grindrod	
1838	Thomas Jackson	
1839	Theophilus Lessey	
1840	Robert Newton	
1841	James Dixon D.D	
1842	John Hannah D.D	James Bourne Esq
1843	John Scott	John Garner
1844	Jabez Bunting D.D	William Clowes
1845	Jacob Stanley	William Clowes
1846	William Atherton	William Clowes
1847	Samuel Jackson	John Garner
1848	Robert Newton D.D	Thomas King
1849	Thomas Jackson	Stephen Longdin
1850	John Beecham D.D	John Garner
1851	John Hannah D.D	John Garner
1852	John Scott	John Garner
1853	John Lomas	Joseph Bailey Esq
1854	John Farrar	John Garner
1855	Isaac Keeling	George Tetley
1856	Robert Young	Sampson Turner
1857	Francis A West	Thomas Bateman Esq
1858	John Bowers	Sampson Turner
1859	Samuel Dousland Waddy D.D	William Garner
1860	William W Stamp D.D	John Petty
1861	John Rattenbury	William Garner
1862	Charles Prest	William Harland
1863	George Osborn D.D	William Antliff
1864	William L Thornton M.A	James Garner
1865	William Shaw	William Antliff
1866	William Arthur M.A	George Lamb
1867	John Bedford	Thomas Bateman Esq
1868	Samuel Romilly Hall	William Lister
1869	Frederick James Jobson D.D.	Phillip Pugh
1870	John Farrar	Moses Lupton
1871	John H James D.D	James Garner
1872	Luke H Wiseman M.A	James Macpherson
1873	George Thomas Perks M.A.	Samuel Antliff
1874	W Morley Punshon LL.D	William Rowe
1875	Gervase Smith D.D	Robert Smith
1876	Alexander M'Aulay	John Dickenson
1877	William Burt Pope D.D	Thomas Smith
1878	James Harrison Rigg D.D	Henry Phillips
1879	Benjamin Gregory D.D	Thomas Newell
1880	Ebenezer Evans Jenkins M.A D.D	Colin C McKechnie
1881	George Osborn D.D	Charles Kendall
1882	Charles Garrett	Joseph Wood
1883	Thomas M'Cullagh	William Cutts
1884	Frederic Greeves D.D	George Lamb
1885	Richard Roberts	Ralph Fenwick
1886	Robert Newton Young D.D	John Atkinson
1887	John Walton M.A	Thomas Whitehead
1888	Joseph Bush	Thomas Whittaker
1889	Charles Henry Kelly	Joseph Toulson
1890	William Fiddian Moulton M.A D.D	John Hallam
1891	Thomas Bowman Stephenson	Joseph Ferguson
1892	James Harrison Rigg	James Travis
1893	Henry John Pope	John Stephenson
1894	Walford Green	John Wenn
1895	David James Waller	John Watson
1896	Dr Marshall Randles	William Jones
1897	William L Watkinson	James Jackson
1898	Hugh Price Hughes	John Smith
1899	John Edward Radcliffe	William Goodman
1900	Thomas Allen	Joseph Odell
1901	William Theophllus Davison	H Bickerstaffe Kendall
1902	John Shaw Banks	Thomas Mitchell
1903	Marshall Hartley	Thomas H Hunt
1904	Silvester Whitehead	Robert Harrison
1905	Charles Henry Kelly	George E Butt
1906	Albert Clayton	George Parkin
1907	John Smith Simon	Henry Yooll
1908	John Scott Lidgett	James Pickett
1909	William Perkins	Sir William P Hartley
1910	John Hornabrook	Samuel S Henshaw
1911	Dr Henry Haigh	Edwin Dalton
1912	Frederick Luke Wiseman	Thomas Jackson
1913	Samuel Francis Collier	Joseph Ritson
1914	Dr Dinsdale Thomas Young	George Bennett
1915	Richard Waddy Moss	John D Thompson
1916	Dr John Greenwood Tasker	Arthur T Guttery
1917	Simson Johnson	James T Parr
1918	Samuel Chadwick	William A Hammond
1919	Dr William Theodore Aquila Barber	James Watkin
1920	John Thomas Wardle Stafford	Matthew P Davison
1921	Dr John Alfred Sharpe	Samuel Horton
1922	John E Wakerley	Henry J Taylor
1923	Thomas Ferrier Hulme	George Armstrong
1924	Amos Burnet	Joseph T Barkby
1925	John Holland Ritson	James Lockhart
1926	William Russell Maltby	Albert L Humphries
1927	William Hodson Smith	George Armitage
1928	Dr John William Lightley	John G Bowran
1929	William Francis Lofthouse	James H Saxton
1930	Dr Herbert Brook Workman	William M Kelley
1931	Charles Rider Smith	Edward McLellan
1932	Dr Henry Maldwyn Hughes	William Younger

== Post-1932 ==
John Scott Lidgett was the first President of the post-Union Methodist Conference, 1908–1909

In 1932 each denomination held a conference which elected their own interim presidents, followed a few months later by a unified conference at which a new president and lay vice-president were elected.

Year of election	President of Methodist Conference	Vice-president
1932	John Scott Lidgett	Sir Robert William Perks
1933	Frederick Luke Wiseman	Moses Bourne JP
1934	William Younger	George Pearse Dymond
1935	William Christopher Jackson	Edmund Lamplough
1936	Charles Ensor Walters	James Gray JP
1937	Robert Bond	Isaac Foot jr MP
1938	William Lansdell Wardle	R. Parkinson Tomlinson MP
1939	Richard Pyke	Sir Isaac Holden
1940	Henry Bett	William Ernest Clegg
1941	Walter Henry Armstrong	Ernest Henry Lamb MP, Lord Rochester
1942	Walter James Noble	Herbert Ibberson
1943	Leslie Frederick Church	Charles T. Nightingale
1944	Wilbert Francis Howard	Wilfred Turner
1945	Archibald Walter Harrison	Sir George Knight
1946	Robert Newton Flew	Richard John Soper MP
1947	William Edward Farndale	Albert Victor Murray
1948	Ernest Benson Perkins	Mildred Clarissa Lewis
1949	Harold Burgoyne Rattenbury	John Arthur Stead
1950	William Edwin Sangster	Dr Clifford William Towlson
1951	Howard Watkins-Jones	H. Cecil Pawson MBE
1952	Colin Augustus Roberts	Deaconess Dr Dorothy Farrar
1953	Donald Oliver Soper	Leslie Ward Kay
1954	William Russel Shearer	Harold Guylee Chester OBE
1955	Leslie Dixon Weatherhead	Dr Thomas Edmund Jessop OBE MC
1956	Harold Crawford Walters	Douglas Blatherwick OBE
1957	Harold Roberts	Philip Race
1958	Norman Henry Snaith	Dr John Morel Gibbs OBE
1959	Eric W Baker	Dr Charles Alfred Coulson FRS
1960	Edward Rogers	George Thomas, 1st Viscount Tonypandy
1961	Maldwyn L Edwards	Marjorie Walton Lonsdale OBE
1962	Leslie Davison	A. Lowry Creed
1963	Frederic Greeves	David Foot Nash
1964	A. Kingsley Lloyd	Douglas Vernon Brown
1965	W. Walker Lee	Dr Pauline Webb
1966	Douglas W. Thompson	Albert Bailey
1967	Irvonwy Morgan	Percy L Backus
1968	E. Gordon Rupp	John Clifford Blake CB
1969	Brian Stapleton O'Gorman	Dr Kenneth James Thomas Leese
1970	Rupert E. Davies	Dr W. Russell Hindmarsh
1971	Kenneth L. Waights	John Walton Kellaway MBE JP DL
1972	Harry O. Morton	Dr Howard Souster
1973	Donald R. Lee	John Ireland Miller
1974	J. Russell Pope	Ernest Armstrong MP
1975	Alfred Raymond George	William Albert Cockell
1976	Colin M. Morris	Dr Cyril J Bennett
1977	B. Arthur Shaw	Esther Margaret Waterhouse
1978	Donald English	Mary Lenton
1979	William Gowland	Patrick William Welch
1980	Kenneth G. Greet	Elsie Moult
1981	John A. Newton	David Ensor OBE
1982	Norwyn E. Denny	Pamela Luke
1983	Amos Samuel Cresswell	Paul Gordon Bartlett Lang
1984	Gordon Emerson Barritt	June Elizabeth Lunn
1985	Christopher Hughes Smith	Leon Albert Murray MBE
1986	Nigel Langley Gilson	Anne Mary Knighton
1987	Dr William Rhys Davies	Derek W Burrell
1988	Richard Granville Jones	Jennifer Carpenter
1989	John James Vincent	John Bryan Hindmarsh
1990	Donald English	Rosemary Wass
1991	Ronald William Cecil Hoar	Ivan Weekes
1992	Kathleen Margaret Richardson	Dr Edmund Marshall MP
1993	Brian Edgar Beck	Susan Howdle
1994	Leslie John Griffiths	Christine Walters
1995	Brian Richard Hoare	Stella Bristow
1996	Nigel Thomas Collinson	Jan Sutch Pickard
1997	John Brian Taylor	Sir Michael Checkland
1998	William Peter Stephens	Margaret Parker
1999	Stuart John Burgess	Brian Thornton
2000	Inderjit Bhogal	Sister Eluned Williams MBE
2001	Christina Le Moignan	Ann Leck MBE
2002	Ian White	Professor Peter Howdle
2003	Dr Neil Richardson	Judy Jarvis
2004	Will Morrey	Deacon Myrtle Ann Poxon
2005	Tom Stuckey	John Bell
2006	Graham Carter	Dudley Coates
2007	Dr Martyn Atkins	Ruby Beech
2008	Stephen Poxon	David Storry Walton
2009	David Gamble	Dr Richard Mark Vautrey
2010	Alison Tomlin	Deacon Eunice Attwood
2011	Leo Osborn	Ruth Elizabeth Pickles
2012	Mark Wakelin	Michael King
2013	Ruth Gee	Dr Daleep Satyanand Mukarji OBE
2014	Kenneth Howcroft	Gillian Margaret Dascombe
2015	Steven Wild	Dr Jill Barber
2016	Dr Roger Walton	Rachel Judith Lampard
2017	Loraine Mellor	Jill Baker
2018	Michaela Youngson	Bala Gnanapragasam
2019	Dr Barbara Glasson	Professor Clive Marsh
2020	Richard Teal	Carolyn Lawrence
2021	Sonia Hicks	Barbara Easton
2022	Graham Thompson	Anthony Boateng
2023	Gill Newton	Deacon Kerry Scarlett
2024	Helen Cameron	Carolyn Godfrey

== See also ==
- Organisation of the Methodist Church of Great Britain
- Wesleyan Methodist Church (Great Britain)
