= George Osborn (minister) =

English religious leader (1808–1891)

The Reverend George Osborn
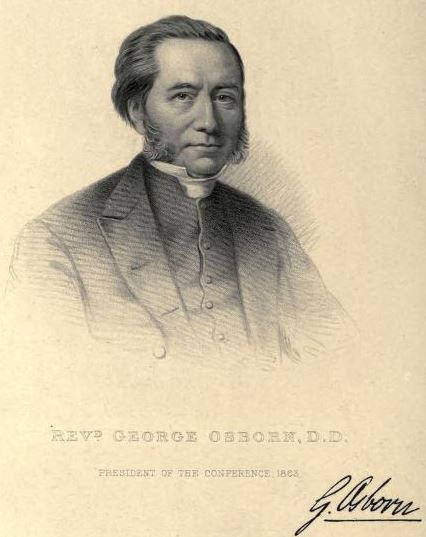
- Portrait, 1891

President of the Methodist Conference
- In office 1863–1864
- Preceded by: Charles Prest
- Succeeded by: William L Thornton
- In office 1881–1882
- Preceded by: Ebenezer Evans Jenkins
- Succeeded by: Charles Garrett

Personal details
- Born: 1808 Rochester, Kent
- Died: 19 April 1891 (aged 82–83) Richmond, Surrey
- Occupation: Methodist minister

George Osborn (1808–1891) was an English Wesleyan Methodist minister, and President of the Methodist Conference in 1863 and again in 1881.

== Early life ==
Osborn was born at Rochester in 1808. His father, George Osborn (1764–1836), was a window draper in Rochester, a class-leader among the Wesleyan Methodists for twenty-one years, and a steward of the Rochester circuit. He was educated at Dr. Hulett's school at Brompton.

== Ministry ==
Osborn entered the Wesleyan ministry in 1828. In the following year he was appointed to the Brighton circuit, where he laboured successfully for two years.

He was conspicuous as a debater very early in life, and rose rapidly in the estimation of his co-religionists. London in 1836–42 and 1851–68, Manchester in 1842–5 and 1848–51, and Liverpool in 1845–48 had the benefit of his ministerial services. Although an enthusiastic Methodist, he was catholic in his sentiments, was friendly with the ministers of all evangelical denominations, and in 1845 was one of the founders of the Evangelical Alliance. In 1851 he was appointed one of the Wesleyan foreign missionary secretaries, and retained that office for seventeen years. The jubilee of the foreign missions took place in 1863. In the same year Osborn was elected president of the conference, and rendered great service to the missions by his advocacy of their claims in the large towns in England. On the retirement of the Rev. Thomas Jackson in 1868, he was elected professor of divinity at Richmond College, and continued to reside there till 1885.

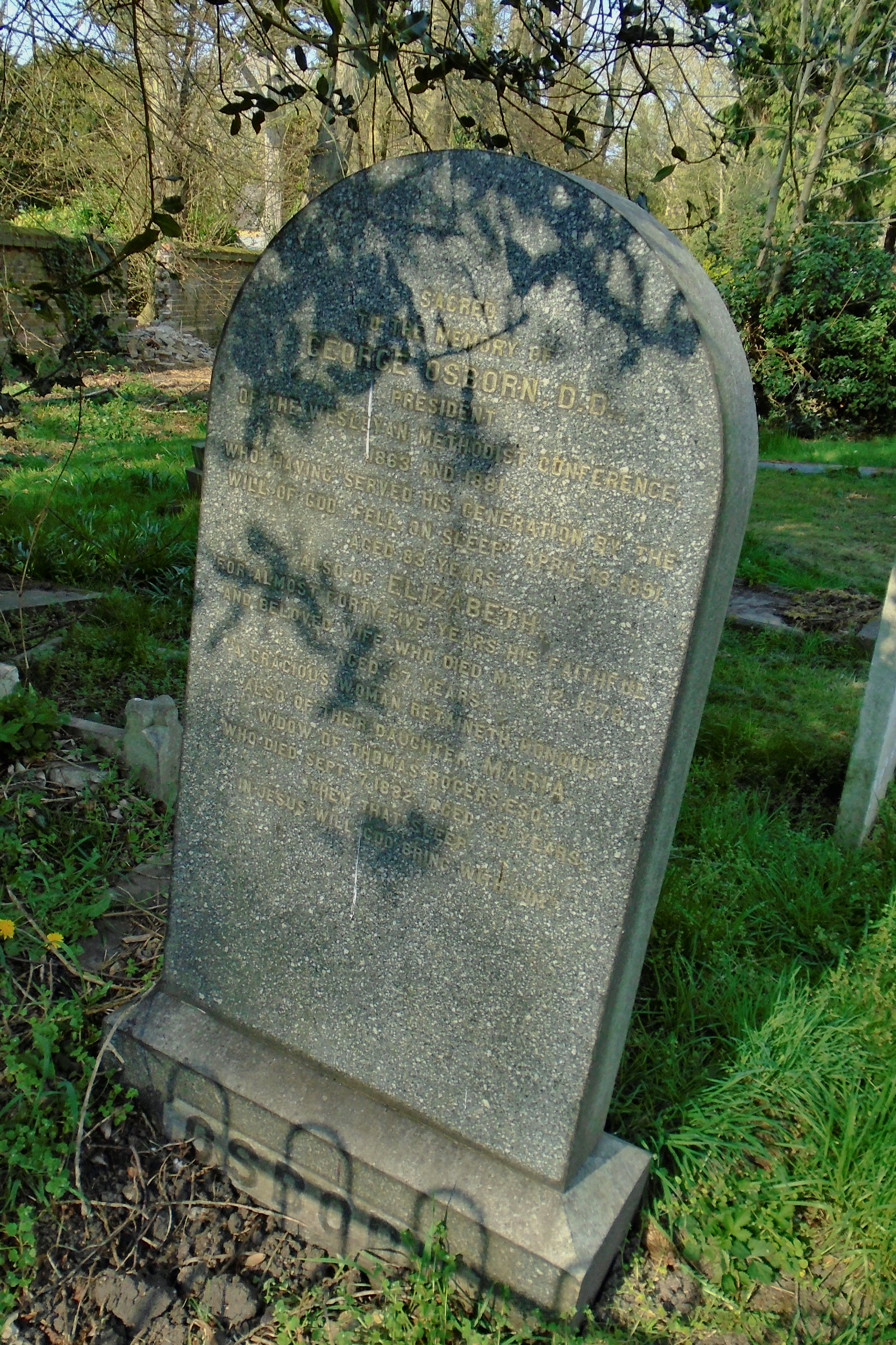
Richmond Cemetery

Osborn was an able expository preacher, and was one of the most noted orators of his church. Originally he was strongly opposed to the admission of lay representatives to the conference, but when the matter had been carried against him, he at once acquiesced in the decision. In 1881 he was for the second time elected to the chair of the conference. From 1885 he was a supernumerary minister, and died at 24 Cambrian Road, Richmond, Surrey, on 19 April 1891. He was buried in Richmond Cemetery.

== Works ==
In 1868 Osborn brought out The Poetical Works of J. and C. Wesley, collected and arranged, an edition in thirteen volumes. His second major work was Outlines of Wesleyan Bibliography; or a Record of Methodist Literature from the beginning, 1869. He also printed a sermons and addresses, and furnished prefaces to many books.

== Family ==
Rev Osborn had 7 daughters with his wife Elizabeth and 4 of them would go on to marry Wesleyan ministers. Most notable was his daughter Katherine who married Rev. Edward Strutt of Mansfield Woodhouse.
