= Robert Young (clergyman) =

Australian clergyman, born 1796

President of the Methodist Conference
- In office 1856–1857
- Preceded by: Isaac Keeling
- Succeeded by: Francis A West

Personal details
- Born: 14 November 1796 Ryton, Durham
- Died: 16 November 1865 (aged 69) Truro, Cornwall
- Occupation: Methodist minister

Robert Young (14 November 1796 – 16 November 1865) was an Australian autobiographer/memoirist and Methodist minister. Young was born in Ryton, Durham, England and died in Truro, Cornwall, England.

Robert Young was elected President of the Methodist Conference at Bristol in 1856.

His son Robert Newton Young was elected President of the Methodist Conference at London in 1886.

== See also ==
- William Binnington Boyce
