= Christopher Hopper (Methodist) =

Early English Methodist

President of the Methodist Conference
- In office 1780–1780
- Preceded by: John Wesley
- Succeeded by: John Wesley

Personal details
- Born: 25 December 1722 Ryton, Durham
- Died: 5 March 1802 (aged 79) Bolton
- Known for: President of the Methodist Conference in Wesley's absence

Christopher Hopper (1722–1802) was the President of the Methodist Conference in John Wesley's absence, at the Bristol conference in 1780.

== Life ==
Hopper was born in 1722 at Ryton, Durham in the north of England. He entered the Wesleyan itinerancy in 1748.

Hopper became a member of the society at Low Spen, near Newcastle, after Wesley's visit there in July 1743. He had been a schoolmaster before becoming an itinerant. Hopper was Wesley's travelling companion in England, Wales and Scotland (being the first Methodist itinerant venturing north of the border). Hopper was an itinerant for forty-seven years and regularly corresponded with Wesley. Wesley appointed him 'Lord President of the North' in 1768 giving him jurisdiction over the Methodist Societies from Cumberland to Lincolnshire.

Hopper wrote "The plain man's epistle to every child of Adam" in 1766.

Hopper was one of the veteran preachers named in Wesley's Deed of Declaration.

Hopper retired to Bolton in 1792, where he built a house next to the chapel, continuing to preach there. Hopper died at Bolton on 5 March 1802.
