= Wilbert Francis Howard =

English Methodist theologian, biblical scholar and clergyman

Wilbert Francis Howard FBA

President of the Methodist Conference
- In office 1944–1945
- Vice President: Wilfred Turner
- Preceded by: Leslie Frederick Church
- Succeeded by: Archibald Walter Harrison

Personal details
- Born: 30 December 1880 Gloucester
- Died: 10 July 1952 (aged 71)
- Occupation: Methodist theologian, biblical scholar and clergyman

Wilbert Francis Howard, FBA (30 December 1880 – 10 July 1952) was an English Methodist theologian, biblical scholar and clergyman.

Born in Gloucester on 30 December 1880, Howard came from a Methodist family. He attended King Edward's School, Birmingham, and the University of Manchester. He was a lay pastor in Tyneside for a year and then worked at Didsbury College as assistant to the president. In 1919, he was appointed New Testament tutor at Handsworth College, where he remained until retiring in 1951; he was the college's principal from 1943 to 1951. He was also president of the Methodist Conference in 1944 and, in a brief acting capacity, in 1946.

Academically, he was interested in New Testament scholarship and edited the second volume of J. H. Moulton's Grammar of New Testament Greek. He was the Dale Lecturer at Mansfield College, Oxford, in 1940, and in 1946–47 was Select Preacher at the University of Cambridge. He was awarded the Burkitt Medal for Biblical Studies in 1947 and was elected a fellow of the British Academy in 1949. He died on 10 July 1952.
