= John A. Newton =

President of the Methodist Conference
- In office 1981–1982
- Vice President: David Ensor OBE
- Preceded by: Kenneth G. Greet
- Succeeded by: Norwyn E. Denny

President of the Wesley Historical Society

Personal details
- Born: 28 September 1930
- Died: 27 March 2017 (aged 86)
- Occupation: Methodist minister, author, historian

John Anthony Newton CBE (28 September 1930 – 27 March 2017) was a Methodist minister, author, historian and former President of the Methodist Conference. Newton was the president of the Wesley Historical Society. Newton was educated at Boston Grammar School in Lincolnshire.

Newton was a noted authority on the Wesley family. His 2002 book Susanna, Susanna Wesley and the Puritan Tradition in Methodism (ISBN 0716205629), is recognised as the authoritative biography of Susanna Wesley.
