= Joseph Benson =

English Methodist minister and Methodist movement leader (1749–1821)

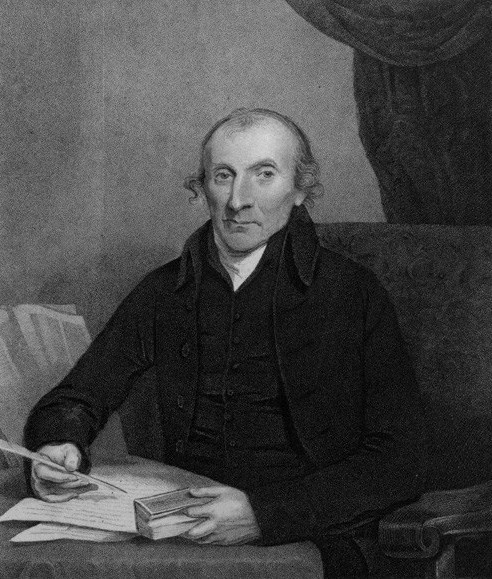
- Joseph Benson

President of the Methodist Conference
- In office 1798–1799
- Preceded by: Thomas Coke
- Succeeded by: Samuel Bradburn
- In office 1810–1811
- Preceded by: Thomas Taylor
- Succeeded by: Charles Atmore

Personal details
- Born: 26 January 1749 Kirkoswald, Cumberland
- Died: 16 February 1821 (aged 72)
- Occupation: Methodist minister

Joseph Benson (26 January 1749 – 16 February 1821) was an early English Methodist minister, one of the leaders of the movement during the time of Methodism's founder John Wesley.

== Life ==
The son of John Benson and Isabella Robinson, his wife, he was born on 26 January 1749, in the parish of Kirkoswald, Cumberland. His father wished him to become a clergyman, sent him to the village school, and then was under a Mr. Dean, a Presbyterian minister living in the parish.

Aged 15, Benson opened a small school in Gamblesby. A cousin took him to a Methodist conventicle, and they read Wesley's sermons. In December 1765 he set off on foot to hear Wesley preach in Newcastle-on-Tyne, arrived too late, but followed him to London. With an introduction to Wesley, he was taken on Bristol in March 1766, and appointed classical master at Kingswood School. There he preached and held cottage and prayer meetings, but remained an Anglican.

Benson went in 1769 to St Edmund Hall, Oxford. In the same year he lost his father. At Kingswood he had met John William Fletcher, who mentioned him to Selina, Countess of Huntingdon. As a result, the Countess asked Benson in 1770 to take the post of head of her Trevecca College. There was a theological difference: the Countess was Calvinistic, while Fletcher and Benson were Arminian. The appointment went badly, but the Countess gave Benson a testimonial.

With a presentation to Rowley, a parish near West Bromwich, Benson applied for ordination, but James Johnson, the Bishop of Worcester refused to ordain him. Benson from then on became a Methodist, and an effective evangelical preacher. He tried in the mid-1770s to broker a deal that would make the Methodists a "daughter church" of the Church of England, working with the Anglican Fletcher, but Wesley was not in agreement.

In a clash with Thomas Coke of 1780, Benson found he had been called a heretic. Wesley managed to smooth over the affair. The contentious matter of the mid-1790s, of Methodist ministers and the sacrament, saw Benson opposed by others such as John Murlin, who disagreed with his view that Methodists should take it in Anglican churches. Benson was a vocal critic of women preachers and he spoke out against Mary Taft.

In 1803, Benson became editor of the Methodist Magazine, and held the post for the rest of his life.

Benson was president of the Methodist conference in 1798 and 1810. He died on 16 February 1821, aged 72.

== Works ==
Benson was an apologist for Methodism, as seen in:

- Defence of the Methodists in Five Letters to the Rev. Dr. Tatham (1793), addressed to Edward Tatham;
- A sequel, A Farther Defence, in five letters to the Rev. William Russell, in answer to his Hints to the Methodists and Dissenters, and to which Russell again replied;
- Vindication of the People called Methodists, in answer to a report from the Clergy of a district in the Diocese of Lincoln (1800); and
- Inspector of Methodism inspected, and the Christian Observer observed (1803), a reply to William Hales.

Benson crossed swords with Joseph Priestley, in Remarks on Dr. Priestley's System of Materialism and Necessity (1788), and A Scriptural Essay towards the Proof of an Immortal Spirit in Man, being a continuation of Remarks (1788). His view of Priestley's materialism was basic, and he took the direction of exposition of Arminian theology. He was in Birmingham at the time of the Priestley Riots of 1791, and made journal entries about them.

Other writings were:

- A Demonstration of the Want of Common Sense in the New Testament Writers, on the Supposition of their believing and teaching Socinianism (1791), which was appended to Fletcher's Socinianism Unscriptural;
- Holy Bible, containing the Old and New Testaments ... with Notes, Critical, Explanatory, and Practical, 2nd edition, 1811–18, 5 vols.
- "Sermons on Various Occasions, Most of them on the Principal Subjects of Genuine Christianity", 1814

== Family ==
Benson married Sarah Thompson at Leeds, 28 January 1780. They had at least two sons.

== Notes ==
Attribution

This article incorporates text from a publication now in the public domain: Stephen, Leslie, ed. (1885). "Benson, Joseph". Dictionary of National Biography. Vol. 4. London: Smith, Elder & Co.
