= Jabez Bunting =

English Wesleyan Methodist leader (1779–1858)

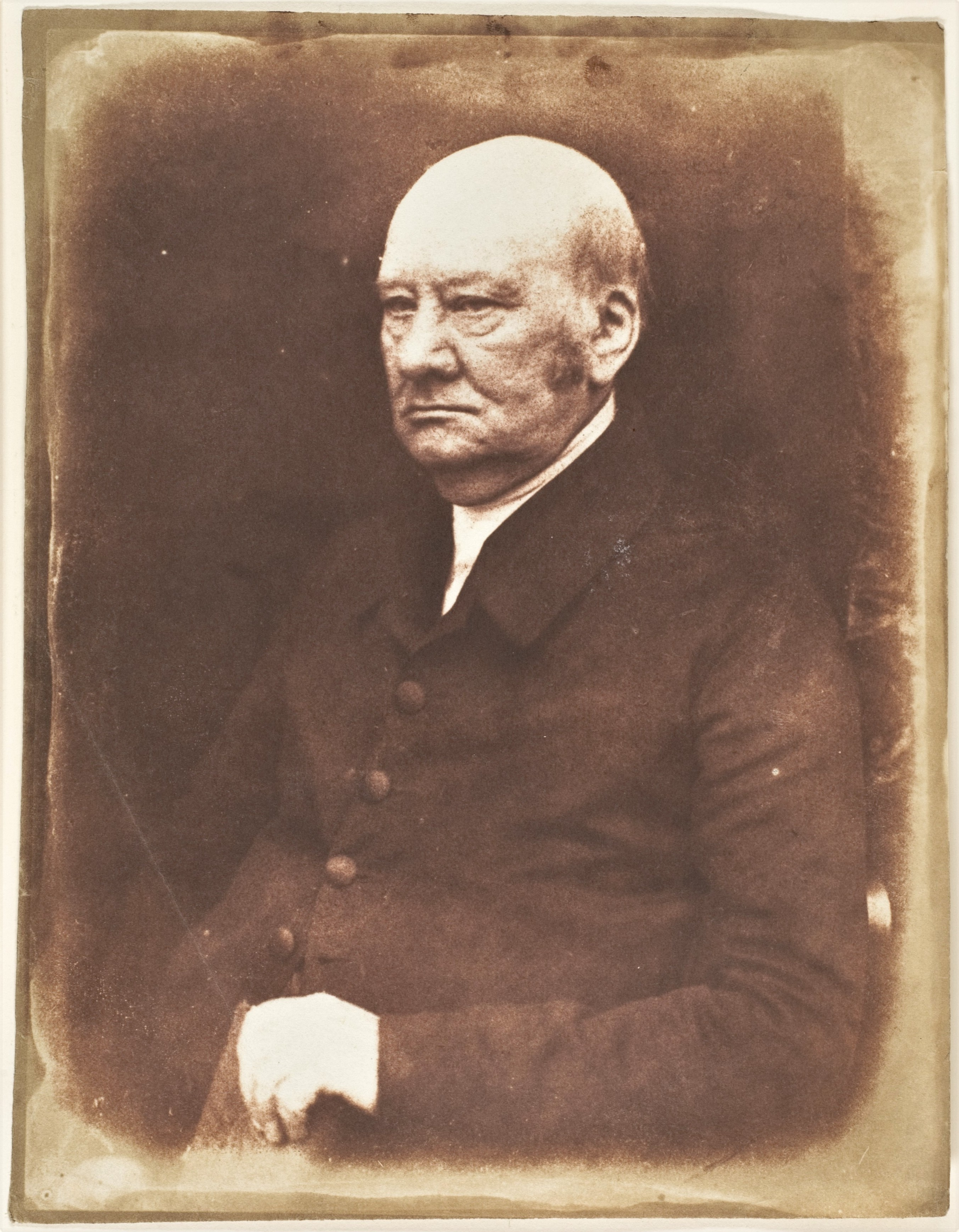
- Dr Jabez Bunting by Hill & Adamson, c. 1843–47

President of the Methodist Conference
- In office 1820–1821
- Preceded by: Jonathan Crowther
- Succeeded by: George Marsden
- In office 1828–1829
- Preceded by: John Stephens
- Succeeded by: James Townley
- In office 1836–1837
- Preceded by: Richard Reece
- Succeeded by: Edmund Grindrod
- In office 1844–1845
- Preceded by: John Scott
- Succeeded by: Jacob Stanley

Personal details
- Born: 13 May 1779 Manchester, England
- Died: 16 June 1858 (aged 79)
- Occupation: Wesleyan Methodist preacher

Jabez Bunting (13 May 1779 – 16 June 1858) was an English Wesleyan Methodist leader and the most prominent Methodist after John Wesley's death in 1791.

Bunting began as a revivalist but later became dedicated to church order and discipline. He was a popular preacher in numerous cities. He held numerous senior positions as administrator and watched budgets closely. Bunting and his allies centralised power by making the Conference the final arbiter of Methodism, and giving it the power to reassign preachers and select superintendents. He was particularly zealous in the cause of foreign missions. Politically, he was conservative, as were most Methodist leaders of the time.

== Early life ==
Born of humble parentage at Manchester in 1779, Bunting was educated at Manchester Grammar School. He had been converted at the age of twelve under the ministry of the Wesleyan Joseph Benson, and, at the age of nineteen, began to preach among the revivalists. He was still a practising revivalist as late as 1802. At Macclesfield, he saw revivals leading to dissension and division, and his views changed fundamentally. From this time onwards Bunting was an exponent of church order and discipline, and an implacable opponent of revivalism.

== Ministry ==
Bunting was "received into full connexion" (that is, became an ordained minister) in 1803. He continued to minister for upwards of 57 years in Manchester, Sheffield, Leeds, Liverpool, London and elsewhere. Bunting was a popular preacher and an effective platform speaker; in 1818 he was given the degree of M.A. by the University of Aberdeen, and in 1834 that of D.D. (doctorate) by Wesleyan University of Middletown, Connecticut, United States. He identified as an Evangelical Arminian.

=== Leadership ===
Bunting was able to wield authority by occupying several important offices within the Connexion. Most significantly, he was four times chosen to be president of the Conference (heading the ruling body of the Wesleyan Methodist Connexion) in 1820, 1828, 1836 and 1844. He repeatedly served as secretary of the Legal Hundred (secretary of the conference). He was also secretary to the Wesleyan Missionary Society for eighteen years, having succeeded Richard Watson. In 1835, Bunting was appointed president of the first Wesleyan theological college (at Hoxton), and in this position he succeeded in materially raising the standard of education among Wesleyan ministers.

Under his leadership, Methodism ceased to be tied to the established Church of England and became wholly separate. Vickers (2008) states that Bunting was "the epitome of 'high Methodism', which stressed the Connexion, the national, the international (including foreign missions)." As the Methodist Conference convened only a few days annually, and most attending preachers lacked business experience, real power rested with a standing (permanent) executive body, which was largely under Bunting's influence. When Bunting was absent from conference sessions, it became evident that the Conference struggled to conduct coherent or effective business; it generally deferred to the executive's proposals. This centralisation of power left little room for opposition or autonomy. Consequently, tensions grew between central authority and local initiative. In local disputes, Bunting upheld the authority of ministers to instruct and discipline their members. (Note: A prominent example occurred in 1827, when Bunting insisted on installing an organ at the Brunswick Chapel in Leeds, despite the objections of local Methodists, who viewed it as a symbol of clericalism, if not "popery". In response, a faction of these dissenting Methodists broke away and formed a new denomination, the Protestant Methodists.)

Bunting was satirized in Wesleyan Undertakings – a collection of critical sketches of Methodist leaders published in 1840 – which depicted him as intolerably autocratic, "a monster of greatness". Bunting defended the supremacy of Conference, stating: "Methodism hates democracy as it hates sin".

As well as detractors, Bunting also had loyal supporters. Urlin (1901) wrote an appraisal:

"His figure was hardly impressive, he was of middle size, portly, looking like a mayor. The charm was in the voice, which once heard could not easily be forgotten. It had a ring of authority and decision, though not of harshness, and it was at the same time flexible and persuasive… His fame was based rather on his abilities as a tactician and organiser, in short, he had the qualities of a statesman; and he did for Methodism what Bishop S. Wilberforce did for the Anglican Church."

==== Response to decline and secessions ====
Under Bunting's presidency in 1820 the Resolutions on Pastoral Work or Liverpool Minutes were adopted by the conference in Liverpool. The resolutions encouraged class meetings and catechesis, and set out the working principles by which the Methodist leaders present at the conference sought "to cultivate more fully the spirit of Christian pastors". They were revised by conference in 1885. Methodist researcher Andrew Stobart states that the resolutions were adopted at a time of crisis when the recently established Wesleyan Methodist Connexion was struggling to maintain membership numbers in its early years: the movement had recorded a net loss of 4,688 members during the previous year.

Bunting's policies provoked opposition leading to the secession of the Protestant Methodists and Wesleyan Methodist Association, in 1828 and 1838 respectively. In 1849, the Wesleyan Reform movement broke away from the Wesleyan Connexion following the expulsion of James Everett, William Griffith and Samuel Dunn, critics of Bunting's leadership, from the Wesleyan Connexion's Manchester Conference. Numerous alliances with other groups failed and weakened his control.

=== Views ===
Politically, Bunting was a conservative and Tory. He did not encourage social movements, including the early temperance movement; while not opposed to abstinence, Bunting saw the temperance movement as an obstacle to the stability he sought. (Note: In the late 1830s and early 1840s, temperance became a contentious issue within the Connexion, particularly in Cornwall, where Methodists and old dissenters promoted it, leading to conflict as members deserted ministers who refused to sign the temperance pledge and use unfermented wine during the sacrament, and although the Conference prohibited its use in 1841, a pragmatic Cornish superintendent allowed some leniency to avoid further schism. In 1842, around 600 individuals broke away to form the Teetotal Wesleyan Methodists.) As President of the Conference, he supported the transportation of the Tolpuddle martyrs despite the fact that they were closely linked to Methodism, their leaders being local preachers. He did, however, champion liberal causes such as religious liberty and he supported Catholic Emancipation in 1829.

== Family ==
Bunting was twice married and had three sons. His eldest son, William Maclardie Bunting (1805–1866), was also a distinguished Wesleyan minister and minor hymnwriter. A younger son, Thomas Percival Bunting (1811–1886), was his biographer. His grandson Sir Percy William Bunting (1836–1911), son of T. P. Bunting, was a prominent liberal nonconformist and editor of the Contemporary Review. His granddaughter Sarah Amos (1841–1908), a daughter of T. P. Bunting, was a liberal political activist.

== Death and commemoration ==
He died in 1858 and was interred in Wesley's Chapel. In 1986 a green plaque was placed on his home at 30 Myddelton Square, London.

== See also ==
- List of presidents of the Methodist Conference
- List of Methodists
- John William Fletcher, John Wesley's designated successor
