= Dorothy Farrar =

British Methodist deaconess and preacher

- Born: 18 April 1899; Halifax, West Yorkshire
- Died: 16 May 1987 (aged 88); Holmfield
- Education: Bedford College
- Occupation: deaconess

Dr. Dorothy Hincksman Farrar (18 April 1899 – 16 May 1987) was a British Methodist deaconess and preacher. She taught at the Wesley Deaconess Order in Ilkley and she was the second female Vice President of the annual Methodist Conference.

== Life ==
Farrar was born in Halifax. Her mother was Louisa Frances (born Hincksman) and her father was Joseph Farrar and he made textile machines. She was named after Dorothy Hincksman who had been a nineteenth century missionary. She was educated at the private Methodist Oakfield School in Arnside. This was a boarding-school. She went on to Bedford College which following her graduation she later studied further and gained a doctorate in 1931 in psychology.

Her mentor was Revd Dr Russell Maltby who was a keen supporter of women and Warden of the Wesley Deaconess Order. He encouraged her to preach in Halifax where she had a mixed reception. Some were very supportive, but others would leave the service as she began to speak without listening any further.

Farrar became a deaconess in 1936 and she started teaching at the Wesley Deaconess College where she had trained in Ilkley. Her mentor Rev Maltby was still the warden until 1940.

In 1952 she was the second woman ever elected to be vice-president of the annual Methodist Conference. Farrar retired in 1962.

In 1978 it was decided to stop recruiting any further Wesley deaconesses and this was a disappointment to her. However, in 1986 the Methodist Diaconal Order which accepted both men and women was seen by her as a good replacement.

== Death and legacy ==
Farrar died in a nursing home in Holmfield in Halifax in 1987.

In 2005 at the Edinburgh conference a lecture was given titled "A warmed heart and a disciplined mind perfectly joined": Sister Dorothy Hincksman Farrar (1899– 1987)" by Dr John A. Hargreaves.
