= Richard Watson (Methodist) =

British Methodist theologian

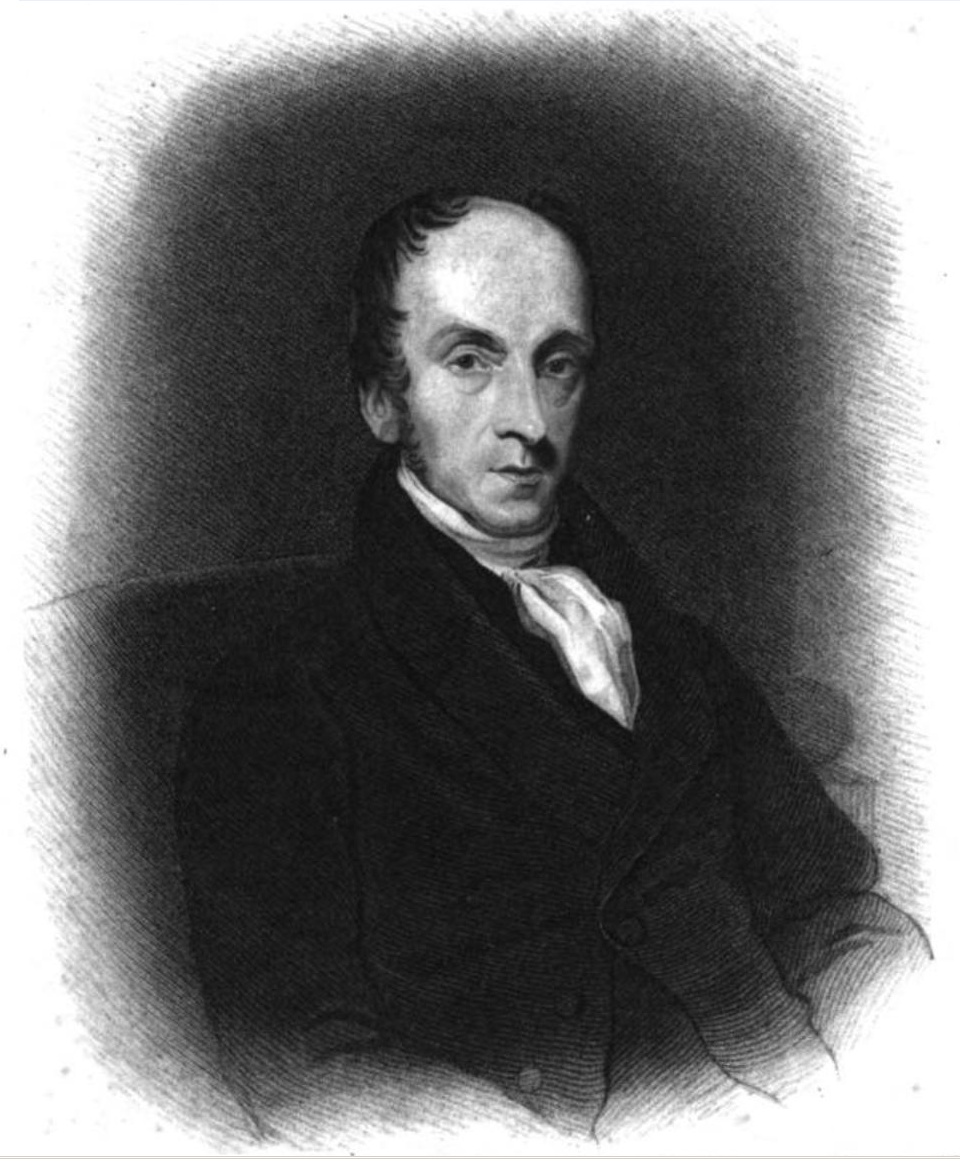
- Richard Watson

President of the Methodist Conference
- In office 1826–1827
- Preceded by: Joseph Entwisle
- Succeeded by: John Stephens

Personal details
- Born: 22 February 1781 Lincolnshire
- Died: 8 January 1833 (aged 51)
- Occupation: Methodist theologian

Richard Watson (1781–1833) was a British Methodist theologian, a leading figure of Wesleyan Methodism in the early 19th century.

== Biography ==
=== Early life and education ===
Watson was born on 22 February 1781, at Barton-upon-Humber, in Lincolnshire. He was the seventh of eighteen children of Thomas and Ann Watson. His father, a saddler, held Calvinist views, and Richard was brought up in the Countess of Huntingdon's Connexion. Reacting against those teachings, he attended a Wesleyan chapel as a boy, and was received there in 1794.

In 1791, Watson entered Lincoln Grammar School. In 1795 he was apprenticed to a joiner at Lincoln.

=== Career ===
In 1796, Watson preached his first sermon, and moved to Newark-on-Trent as assistant to Thomas Cooper, as a Wesleyan preacher. In 1796, he entered the Methodist itinerancy, and was received into full connection as a travelling minister in 1801. Meanwhile, he was stationed at Ashby-de-la-Zouch, Castle Donington, and Derby.

In 1801, Watson married Mary Henslow of Castle Donington, daughter of a Methodist New Connexion preacher there. They had two children. In 1803, he withdrew from the Wesleyans, and joined the New Connexion, resenting an unfounded charge of Arianism. In 1805, he became assistant secretary of the New Connexion's conference, and in 1807 he was fully admitted to its ministry and was appointed secretary. He was first stationed at Stockport, then from 1806 at Liverpool, where he engaged in literary work for Thomas Kaye.

In 1807, Watson resigned his ministry. In 1808 he was engaged as editor of the Liverpool Courier by Kaye. In 1812 he then returned to the Wesleyan Connexion, and was reinstated in his former position. In 1812, he was stationed at Wakefield, and at Hull from 1814 to 1816.

In 1813, Watson drew up a plan of a general missionary society, which was accepted by the conference. In 1810 he was removed to London, and made one of the two general secretaries to the Wesleyan Missionary Society from 1821 to 1827. After holding an appointment at Manchester, from 1827 to 29, he returned to London. He was again appointed a resident secretary to the missionary society from 1832 to 1833.

=== Death ===
Watson died in London on 8 January 1833. He was buried in the graveyard behind City Road Chapel, London.

== Theology ==
Watson was a strong Methodist, but constantly wrote of the Anglican communion as "the mother of us all". He was deeply attached to the Anglican prayer-book, and was anxious to keep Methodism in friendly relations with the establishment.

Watson was a gifted writer and theologian. In doctrine, is known to be "an orthodox Trinitarian and an Evangelical Arminian".

In 1818 he wrote a reply to Adam Clarke's doctrine of the eternal Sonship of Christ; Watson believed that Clarke's views were unorthodox and, therefore, not faithfully Wesleyan.

From 1823 to 1829 he worked on his Theological Institutes, which remained a systematic theology standard for many years and deservedly ranks among the ablest expositions of the Arminian system. It was the first attempt to systematize John Wesley's theology and, by extension, Methodist doctrine.

His Biblical and Theological Dictionary (1831) is more comprehensive than previous attempts in English. In 1831, he wrote also a well-regarded Life of Rev. John Wesley.

In Britain, Watson was a leading opponent of slavery. He was not, however, for immediate emancipation.

== Works ==
- Watson, Richard (1800). Theological Institutes. London: Printed by James Nichols.
- Watson, Richard (1817). A defence of the Wesleyan Methodist missions in the West Indies. London: Sold by Blanshard.
- Watson, Richard (1820). Observations on Southey's Life of Wesley. London: T. Cordeux.
- Watson, Richard (1824). The religious instruction of the slaves in the West India Colonies advocated and defended. London: Sold by Butterworth.
- Morley, George; Watson, Richard (1825). Wesleyan missions in the West Indies. London: Wesleyan Methodist Missionary Society.
- Watson, Richard (1830). Conversations for the young. London: John Mason.
- Watson, Richard (1831). A Biblical and theological dictionary. London: John Mason.
- Watson, Richard (1831b). The Life of the Rev. John Wesley. London: John Mason.
- Watson, Richard (1834). An Exposition of the Gospels of St. Matthew And St. Mark. London: John Mason.
- Watson, Richard (1834). Sermons and sketches of sermons. London: John Mason.
- Long, John Dixon; Wesley, John; Watson, Richard (1857). Pictures of slavery in church and state. London: John Mason.

== Notes and references ==
=== Sources ===
- Hagenbach, K. R. (1881). A history of Christian doctrines. Edinburgh: T. & T. Clark.
- Stevenson, George John (1886). Methodist worthies. Characteristic Sketches of Methodist Preachers of the Several Denominations, with Historical Sketch of each Connexion. London: Thomas C Jack, 45 Ludgate Hill.
- Gordon, Alexander (1885). "Watson, Richard (1781-1833)" . In Lee, Sidney (ed.). Dictionary of National Biography. Vol. 60. London: Smith, Elder & Co. pp. 27–29.
