= Charles Atmore =

English Wesleyan minister

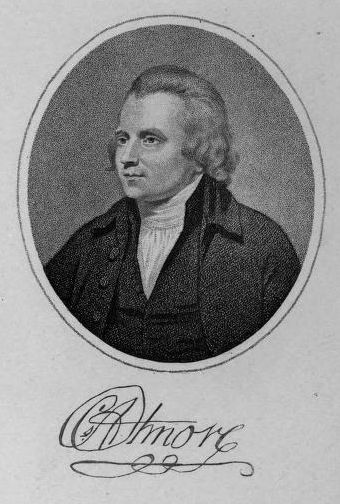

President of the Methodist Conference
- In office 1811–1812
- Preceded by: Joseph Benson
- Succeeded by: Joseph Entwisle

Personal details
- Born: 17 August 1759 Heacham, Norfolk
- Died: 30 June 1826 (aged 66) Cheapside, London
- Occupation: Wesleyan minister

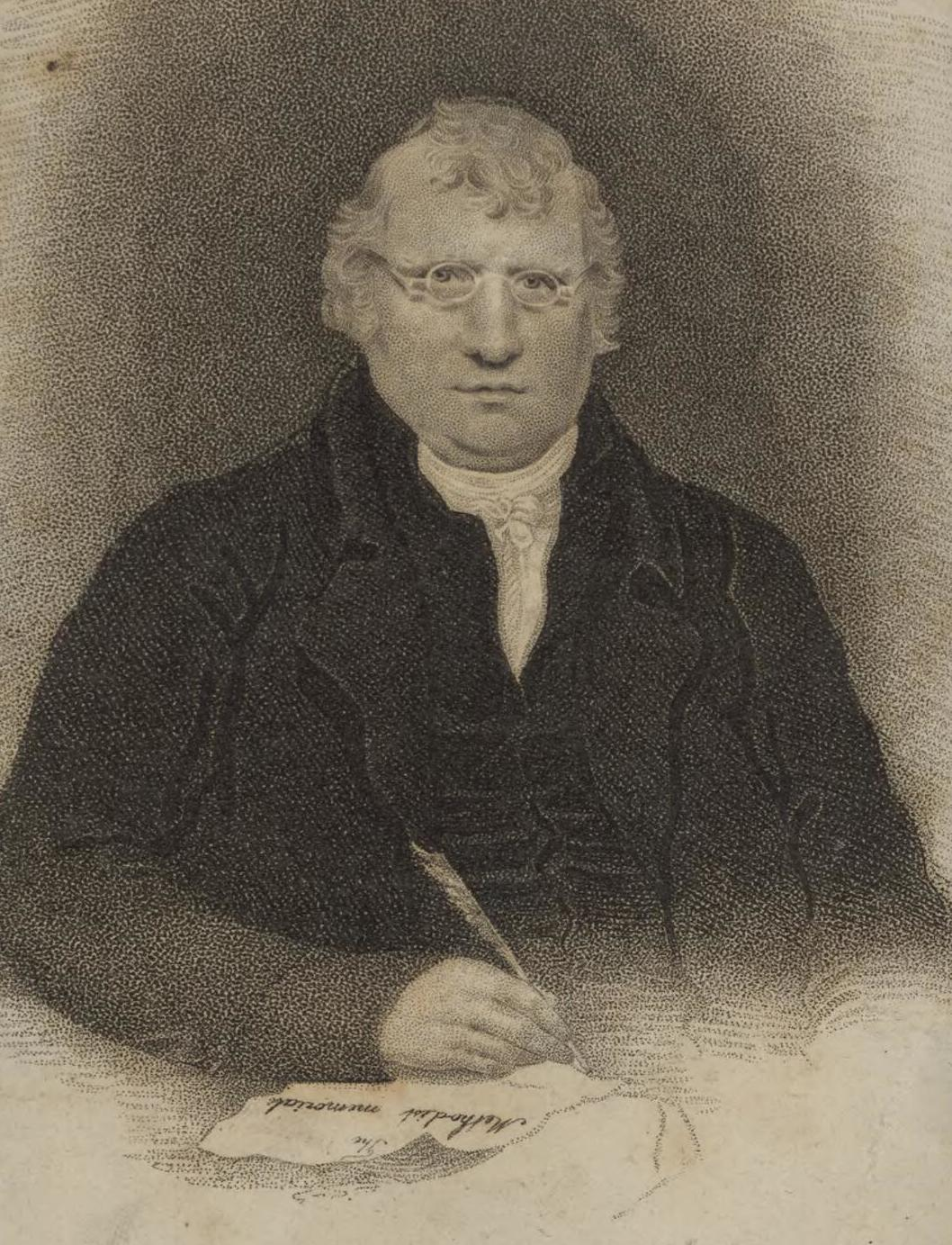
Portrait of Charles Atmore in 1794

Charles Atmore (17 August 1759 - 30 June 1826) was an English Wesleyan minister.

== Life ==
Atmore was born at Heacham, near King's Lynn, Norfolk, 17 August 1759, his father being the captain of a ship belonging to Lynn. In June 1779 he turned his attention to the Wesleyan ministry, and in February 1781 he was sent forth by John Wesley as an itinerant evangelist. At the conference which met in the following August, he was appointed a regular preacher.

Wesley three years later caused Atmore's name to be inserted in the deed of declaration as one of the members of the legal conference. In the discussions on the polity and position of Methodism which took place immediately after Wesley's death, Atmore took a leading part and contributed to the consolidation of the Wesleyan Methodist church.

His ministry until 1825 was in the following towns: York, Edinburgh, Halifax, Bristol, London, Birmingham, Manchester, Wakefield, Liverpool, Leeds, Hull, Salford, Sheffield. In 1811, while stationed in Hull, he was elected to the presidency of the Wesleyan conference.

Atmore, who was twice married, died in Fountain Court, Cheapside, London, on 30 June 1826, aged 66 years.

== Works ==
He was author of the Methodist Memorial (with information on early Methodism), first published in 1801, and later re-issued; Discourses on the Lord's Prayer, 1807, also republished; and also pamphlets and occasional sermons. Another publication called "The Whole Duty of Man" is a volume described as Devout Meditations in its 5th edition was printed and published by Nuttall, Fisher and Co, Liverpool, and written by Rev Charles Atmore. The editorial dated 9/5/1811 says that the book had gone through three editions in a period of under four years, and suggests that the book had drawn upon other works such as Venn's "Complete Duty of Man." (Henry Venn (10 February 1796 – 13 January 1873), and Bennett's "Christians Oratory"
