= Leslie Griffiths =

British Christian minister and life peer (born 1942)

The Reverend and Right Honourable The Lord Griffiths of Burry Port
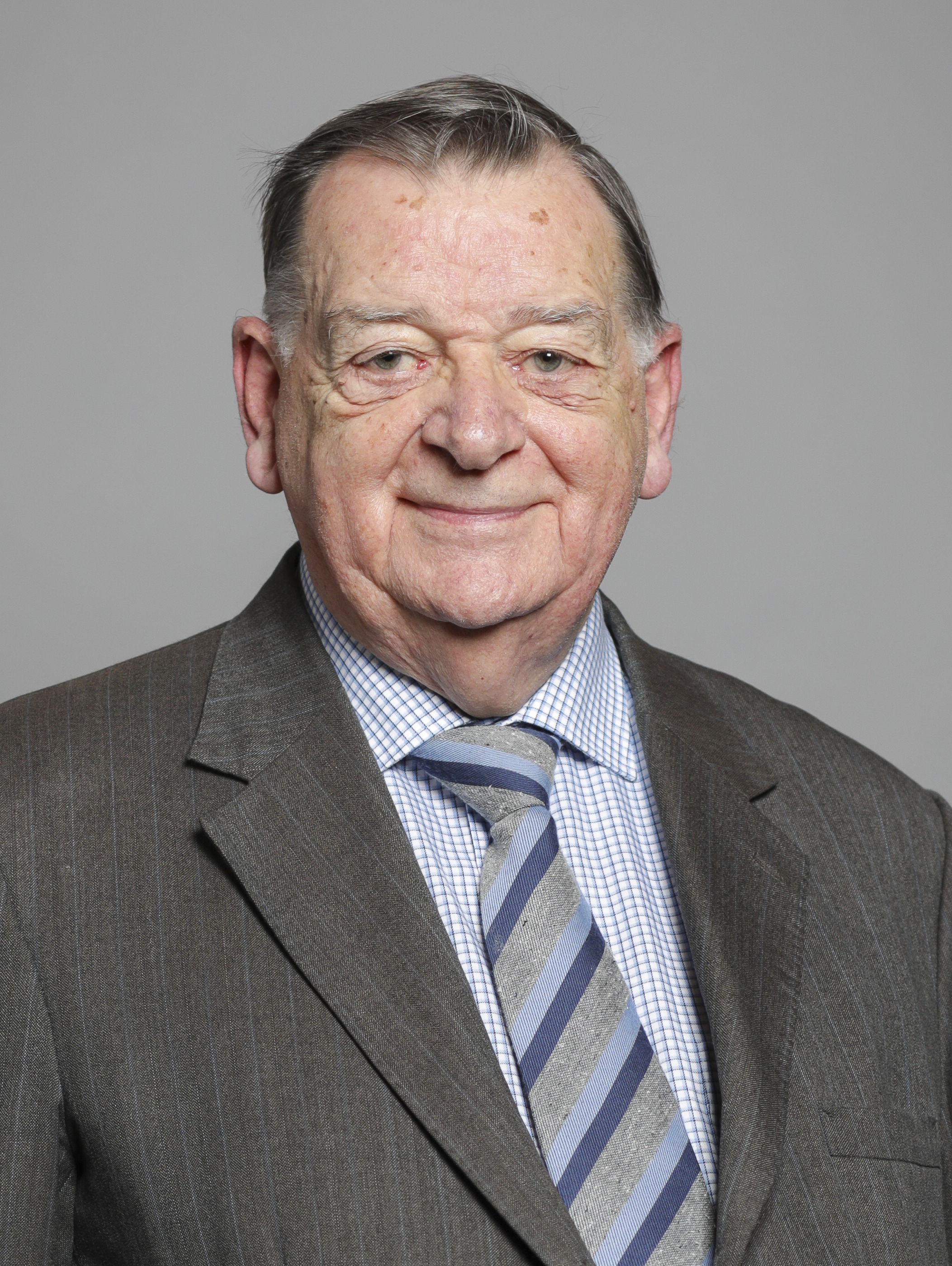
- Official portrait, 2019

Superintendent Minister of Wesley's Chapel and Leysian Mission
- In office September 1996 – September 2017
- Succeeded by: Jennifer Smith

President of the Methodist Conference
- In office July 1994 – July 1995
- Vice President: Christine Walters
- Preceded by: Brian Beck
- Succeeded by: Brian Hoare

Member of the House of Lords
- Lord Temporal
- Life peerage 30 June 2004

Personal details
- Born: 15 February 1942 (age 84) Burry Port, Carmarthenshire
- Party: Labour
- Spouse: Margaret
- Children: 3
- Education: Cardiff University
- Other offices: 2017–2020: Shadow DCMS Spokesperson; 2017–2020: Shadow Wales Spokesperson; 2017–2020: Opposition Whip in the Lords

Leslie John Griffiths, Baron Griffiths of Burry Port FLSW (born 15 February 1942) is a British Methodist minister, politician and life peer who served as President of the Methodist Conference from 1994 to 1995. A member of the Labour Party, he was an opposition spokesperson and whip in the House of Lords from 2017 to 2020.

== Early life ==
Griffiths was born in Burry Port in Carmarthenshire, Wales, on 15 February 1942. He attended Llanelli Grammar School before studying at Cardiff University. Griffiths is the Patron of WEA Llanelli.

== Early ministry and career ==
Griffiths became a local preacher in the Methodist Church of Great Britain in 1963. He completed a Master of Arts in Theology at Fitzwilliam College, Cambridge in 1969, while training for the ministry at Wesley House. He spent most of the 1970s serving the Methodist Church of Haiti, where he was ordained, before returning to Britain to serve in ministries in Caversham, Loughton, and Golders Green. In 1987 Griffiths completed a PhD from the School of Oriental and African Studies, University of London.

== President and superintendent ==
In 1994, Griffiths became one of the few people to be elected President of the Methodist Conference whilst still a circuit minister. In this role he was the spiritual and administrative leader of the Methodists in Britain.

In 1996 he became superintendent minister at Wesley's Chapel, London. He retired in 2017 and preached his last sermon on 6 August. However, he returned to take services at Loughton monthly during 2018, when the church there was between ministers. He was created Baron Griffiths of Burry Port, of Pembrey and Burry Port in the County of Dyfed in 2004.

On 20 August 2009, Griffiths published an article in the Methodist Recorder outlining a prospective plan for his "conditional ordination" by Richard Chartres, Bishop of London, in the Church of England. The plan was the subject of detailed discussion at the Methodist Conference (sitting in closed session) in 2008 and 2009 and the conference withheld consent for this move.

On 1 September 2011, Griffiths was appointed as the thirteenth president of the Boys' Brigade.

In 2012, Griffiths was elected a Fellow of the Learned Society of Wales.

== Arms ==
Coat of arms of Leslie Griffiths
Adopted 2006 Crest Entwined about a bottle kiln Or a dragon wings displayed the body reflexed over the sinister side with the tail to the dexter Gules langued Or. Escutcheon Gyronny Argent and Vert on a Celtic Cross Gules between four Escallops flukes inwards five roundels Or. Supporters On either side a male griffin Gules armed langued rayed and holding in the interior forefoot a Conch shell Or. Motto In Fide Fiducia (in Faith, trust) Symbolism The griffins are a pun on the surname. The rest of the Achievement contains elements from Wales, including the green and white field, and Christianity. The seashells represent Burry Port.

Orders of precedence in the United Kingdom
Preceded by The Lord Cameron of Dillington	Gentlemen; Baron Griffiths of Burry Port	Followed by The Lord Kerr of Kinlochard
