= Adam Clarke =

Irish writer and biblical scholar (1762–1832)

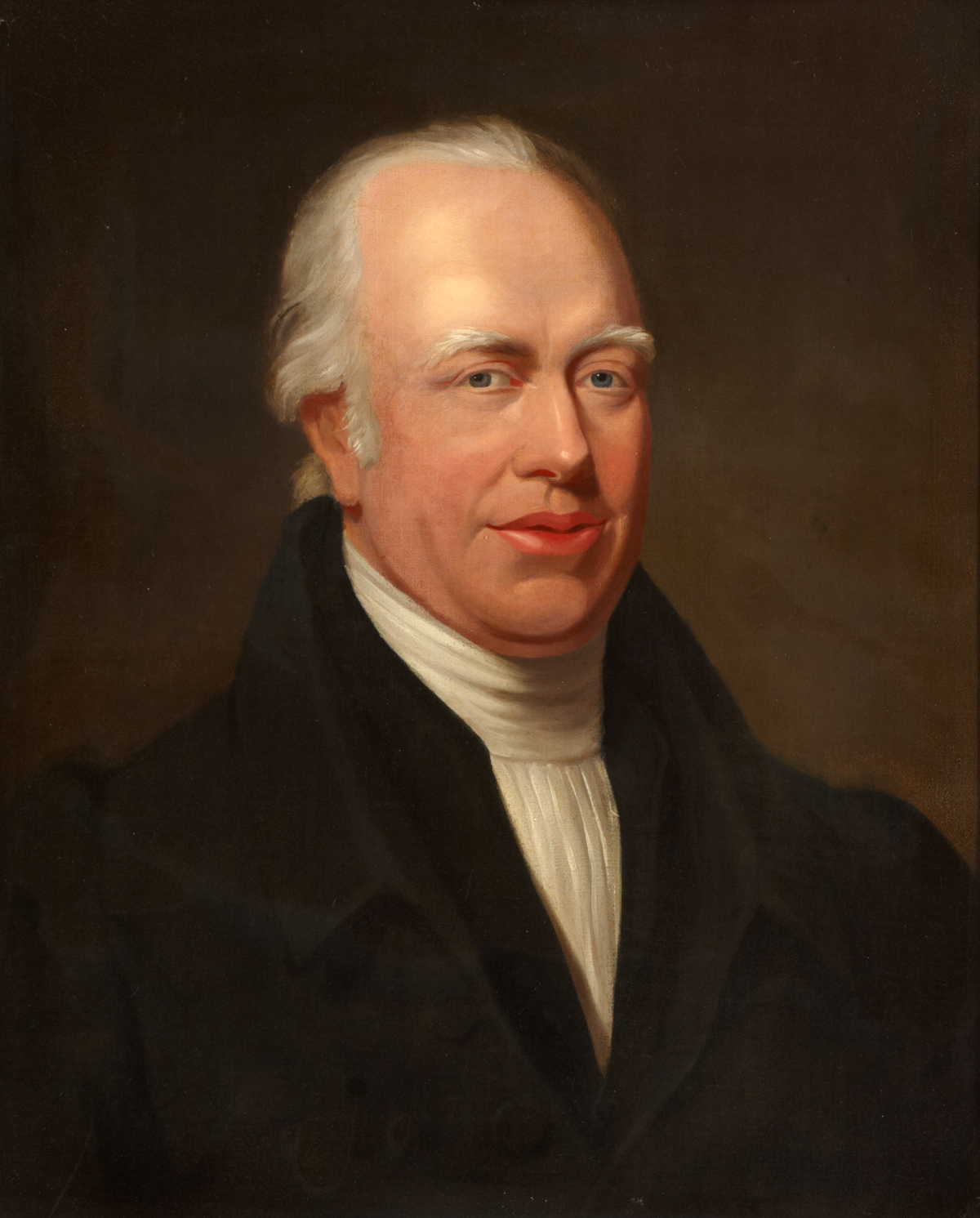
- Portrait of Adam Clarke

President of the Wesleyan Methodist Conference
- In office 1806–1807
- Preceded by: Thomas Coke
- Succeeded by: John Barber
- In office 1814–1815
- Preceded by: Walter Griffith
- Succeeded by: John Barber
- In office 1822–1823
- Preceded by: George Marsden
- Succeeded by: Henry Moore

Personal details
- Born: 1762 Moybeg Kirley, Tobermore, Ireland
- Died: 26 August 1832 (aged 69–70) London, England
- Occupation: Writer; scholar

Adam Clarke (1762 – 26 August 1832) was an Irish writer and biblical scholar. As a writer and biblical scholar, he published an influential Bible commentary among other works. Additionally, he was a Methodist theologian who served three times as President of the Wesleyan Methodist Conference (British: 1806–07, 1814–15 and 1822–23), and of the Irish Conference (1811, 1812, 1816, 1822).

== Biography ==
=== Early life and education ===
Clarke was born in 1760 or 1762, in the townland of Moybeg Kirley near Tobermore in County Londonderry.

His father, an Anglican, was a village schoolmaster and farmer; his mother was a Presbyterian. His childhood consisted of a series of life-threatening mishaps. After receiving a very limited education he was apprenticed to a linen manufacturer, but, finding the employment uncongenial, he resumed school-life at the institution founded by Wesley at Kingswood.

In 1778, at the age of fourteen, Rev. John Wesley invited him to become a pupil in the Methodist seminary lately established at Kingswood, Bristol. In 1779, he converted to Methodism after listening to a preacher.

=== Career ===
In 1782, at nineteen he became an itinerant preacher, appointed to the circuit of Bradford, Wiltshire, until 1805. He afterwards resided chiefly in London, and devoted much of his time to literary research.

While second to none in the labours of the ministry, Clarke was a most assiduous scholar. First the classics engaged his especial attention, then the early Christian fathers, and then Oriental writers; Hebrew, Syriac, Arabic, Persian, Sanskrit, and other Eastern tongues, with the literature which they represented, being among the subjects of his study. Natural science was a favourite subject, and he had an interest in what are called the occult sciences. He contributed to the Eclectic Review from the date of its establishment in 1804, and rendered much literary assistance to the British and Foreign Bible Society.

In 1807 he received the diploma of M.A. from the university and King's College, Aberdeen. In 1808 the University of Aberdeen conferred on Clarke the honorary degree of LL.D., the university highest academic honour.

In 1815, Clarke removed and resided in an estate in Millbrook, for several years. In 1823, Clarke removed to London and afterwards to Haydon Hall, where he resided until his death.

=== Ministry ===
As a preacher, he soon became remarkably popular. He rose to high rank in the Wesleyan body. Clarke was thrice President of the Conference in 1806, 1814 and 1822. At first he was moved from place to place, according to the Wesleyan arrangement, being engaged at various times in Ireland, Scotland, the Channel Islands, and Shetland (1826). Clarke was a preacher of rare power and gifts and particularly in his latter years, he preached to crowded churches.

=== Rosetta Stone ===
Clarke was an amateur historian and scholar, and was invited by Brandt, secretary of the Royal Society of Antiquarians to see the newly acquired Rosetta Stone. At that time in 1803, the writing and composition of the stone had not been translated, nor had all three languages been positively identified. Clarke proposed that the stone was basalt, a theory which while recently was found to be incorrect was thought to be correct until the late 1900s when better scanning equipment was developed. He also proposed that the third language was Coptic (it was actually Demotic, an earlier form of the Egyptian language that would become Coptic), a clue which was used by Jean-François Champollion who successfully completed the translation in 1822.

=== Memberships ===
He was elected a member of six of the most learned societies of his day. He was a member of the British and Foreign Bible Society, Fellow of the American Antiquarian Society in 1816, a Member of the Royal Irish Academy, an Associate of the Geological Society of London, a Fellow of the Royal Asiatic Society, and a member of the American Historical Institute.

=== Death ===
Clarke died from an attack of cholera on 26 August 1832. There is a memorial to Adam Clarke in Portrush, Antrim, County Antrim.

== Theological contribution ==
=== Commentary on the Bible ===
He is chiefly remembered for writing a commentary on the Bible which took him 40 years to complete (1831) and which was a primary Methodist theological resource for two centuries. Comments on this work are mixed, but recognize its erudition. By himself he produced nearly half as much material as the scores of scholars who collaborated on the twelve-volume The Interpreters' Bible. His commentary, particularly that on Revelation, identified the Catholic Church with the Antichrist.

Clarke followed Wesley in opposing a Calvinistic scheme of salvation, preferring instead the Wesleyan-Arminian positions regarding predestination, prevenient grace, the offer of justification to all persons, the possibility of entire sanctification, and assurance of salvation.

=== Theological views ===
As a theologian, Clarke reinforced the teachings of Methodist founder John Wesley. He taught that the Bible provides a complete interpretation of God's nature and will. He considered Scripture itself a miracle of God's grace that "takes away the veil of darkness and ignorance."

Perhaps his most controversial position regarded the eternal Sonship of Jesus. Clarke did not believe it biblically faithful to affirm this doctrine, maintaining that prior to the Incarnation, Jesus was "unoriginated". Otherwise, according to Clarke, he would be subordinate to God and therefore not fully divine. This was important to Clarke because he felt that Jesus' divinity was crucial to understanding the atonement.

Clarke's view was opposed by many Methodists, notably Richard Watson. Watson and his allies argued that Clarke's position jeopardized the integrity of the doctrine of the Trinity. Clarke's christological view was rejected in large part by Methodist theologians in favour of the traditional perspective.

=== Support for abolitionism ===
He joined with other ministers in being an early critic of slavery. In his commentary of Isaiah 58:6, he writes :

"Let the oppressed go free – How can any nation pretend to fast or worship God at all, or dare to profess that they believe in the existence of such a Being, while they carry on the slave trade, and traffic in the souls, blood, and bodies, of men! O ye most flagitious of knaves, and worst of hypocrites, cast off at once the mask of religion; and deepen not your endless perdition by professing the faith of our Lord Jesus Christ, while ye continue in this traffic!".

== Works ==
Here are important books written by Clarke. (Note: ([Hare] 1842, p. 366) The following list contains the chief, perhaps all, that added to the writer's reputation. Two or three small pieces which he published are not specified.) There are also : three volumes of Sermons, besides several single discourses and detached pieces; and many anonymous articles in the Classical Journal, in the Eclectic Review, and in various other respectable journals. To these may be added the new edition for the Record Commission of Thomas Rymer's Foedera, in folio, of which he saw the first volume, and part of the second, through the press. The edition was abandoned because of dissatisfaction with his efforts.

- Clarke, Adam (1797). A dissertation on the use and abuse of tobacco. London: Printed for G. Whitefield.
- Clarke, Adam (1800). The Christian prophet and his work. A discourse on 1 Corinthians XIV. 3. By Adam Clarke. London: Printed by G. Story: Sold by G. Whitfield; and J. Butterworth.
- Clarke, Adam (1802). A bibliographical dictionary: containing a chronological account ... of the most curious ... and important books ... to which are added, an essay on bibliography ... and an account of the best English translation of each Greek and Latin classic (6 volumes). Vol. 1. Liverpool: Printed by J. Nuttall, for W. Baynes, London.
- Clarke, Adam (1802). A bibliographical dictionary: containing a chronological account ... of the most curious ... and important books ... to which are added, an essay on bibliography ... and an account of the best English translation of each Greek and Latin classic (6 volumes). Vol. 6. Liverpool: Printed by J. Nuttall, for W. Baynes, London.
- Baxter, Richard; Clarke, Adam (1802). A Christian directory, or, Sure guide to present and eternal happiness (2 volumes). Liverpool: Printed by J. Nuttall.
- Clarke, Adam (1802). A short history of the ancient Israelites : with an account of their manners, customs, laws ... a work of the greatest utility to all those who read the Bible ... London: W. Baynes.
- Clarke, Adam (1806). The bibliographical miscellany; or, supplement to the Bibilographical Dictionary (2 volumes). Vol. 2. London: Printed for W. Baynes, Paternoster-Row.
- Clarke, Adam (1807). A Concise View of the Succession of Sacred Literature ... from the invention of alphabetical characters to the year of our Lord 345. London.
- Baxter, Richard; Harmer, Thomas (1816). Harmer's observations on various passages of scripture,... (4 volumes). Vol. 1. London: Lackington and Co.
- Baxter, Richard; Harmer, Thomas (1816). Harmer's observations on various passages of scripture,... (4 volumes). Vol. 4. London: Lackington and Co.
- Clarke, Adam (1816). The doctrine of salvation by faith proved, or, An answer to the important question, What must I do to be saved?. London: Clarke.
- Clarke, Adam (1817). The Holy Bible : containing the Old and New Testaments : the text carefully printed from the most correct copies of the present Authorized translation, including the marginal readings and parallel texts : with a commentary and critical notes designed as a help to a better understanding of the sacred writings (8 volumes). New York: Daniel Hitt and Abraham Paul.
- Clarke, Adam (1819). A letter to a preacher, on his entrance into the work of the ministry. London: Butterworth and Son.
- Clarke, Adam; Coke, Thomas (1820). Clavis Biblica : or, a compendium of scriptural knowledge containing a general view of the contents of the Old and New Testaments... [New York]: [Carlton and Lanahan].
- Clarke, Adam (1828). Discourses on various subjects relative to the being and attributes of God : and his works in creation, providence, and grace (4 volumes). Vol. 1. London: T. and T. Clarke.
- Clarke, Adam (1829). Extracts from the journal and correspondence of the late Mrs. M.M. Clough, wife of the Rev. Benjamin Clough, missionary in Ceylon. London: Mason.
- Clarke, Adam (1833a). Clarke, J.B.B. (ed.). An account of the infancy, religious, and literary life of Adam Clarke, LL. D., F.A.S., &c. New York: D. Appleton & Co.
- Clarke, Adam (1833b). Clarke, J.B.B. (ed.). An account of the infancy, religious, and literary life of Adam Clarke, LL. D., F.A.S., &c. Vol. 1. London: T. S. Clarke.
- Clarke, Adam (1833c). Clarke, J.B.B. (ed.). An account of the infancy, religious, and literary life of Adam Clarke, LL. D., F.A.S., &c. Vol. 2. London: T. S. Clarke.
- Clarke, Adam (1833d). Clarke, J.B.B. (ed.). An account of the infancy, religious, and literary life of Adam Clarke, LL. D., F.A.S., &c. Vol. 3. London: T. S. Clarke.
- Clarke, Adam (1836). Memoirs of the Wesley family : collected principally from original documents. London: Printed for T. Tegg & Son.
- Clarke, Adam (1836). The miscellaneous works of Adam Clarke (13 volumes). Vol. 1. London: Printed for Thomas Tegg.
- Clarke, Adam (1851). Christian Theology. New York: Lane & Scott.
- Clarke, Adam (1874). Entire sanctification. Philadelphia: E. Jones.

== In literature ==
In 1834, Lydia Sigourney published her poem On the Death of Dr. Adam Clarke..

The poetical illustration Dr. Adam Clarke and the Two Priests of Budha. by Letitia Elizabeth Landon is based on an engraving of an incident in Dr Clarke's life painted by A. Mosses. It is included in Fisher's Drawing Room Scrap Book, 1836, and, as the notes attached refer to Liverpool, it presumably occurred late in his life.

== Notes and references ==
=== Sources ===
- American Antiquarian Society (2019). "Members". American Antiquarian Society.
- Chisholm, Hugh, ed. (1911). "Clarke, Adam" . Encyclopædia Britannica. Vol. 6 (11th ed.). Cambridge University Press. p. 443.
- Daniels, W. H. (1890). The Illustrated History of Methodism in Great Britain, America, and Australia : from the days of the Wesleys to the present year; with an introduction by Bishop Harris. New York: Hunt & Eaton.
- Etheridge, J. W. (1858). The life of the Rev. Adam Clarke, LL. D. New York: Published by Carlton & Porter.
- Fontaine, Edward (1872). How the World Was Peopled: Ethnological Lectures. Pelican Publishing. ISBN 9781455606009.
- [Hare], [John Middleton] (1842). The Life and Labours of Adam Clarke. London: Longman, Brown, Green, and Longmans.
- Hardy, Thomas Duffus, ed. (1873). Syllabus (in English) of the documents relating to England and other kingdoms contained in the collection known as "Rymer's Foedera": Vol. 2 1377–1654. London: Longman & Co., and Trübner & Co. p. xxxv.
- Mcgonigle, Herbert (1983). "The Nature of Atonement in the Theology of Jacobus Arminius". Preacher's Magazine. 59 (1). Kansas City, MO: Beacon Hill Press: 13–15.
- Kelly, Charles H., ed. (1891). Wesley and His Successors. London: Charles H Kelly.
- Langford, Thomas (1983). Practical Divinity: Theology in the Wesleyan Tradition. Nashville: Abingdon.
- Methodist Episcopal Church (1897). North-western Christian Advocate. Vol. 45. Chicago: Swormstedt & Poe.
- Read, Charles A. (1879). The Cabinet of Irish Literature. Vol. 2. Glasgow: Blackie and Son.
- Blaikie, William Garden (1887). "Clarke, Adam" . In Stephen, Leslie (ed.). Dictionary of National Biography. Vol. 10. London: Smith, Elder & Co.
- Sellers, Ian (2004). "Clarke, Adam". Oxford Dictionary of National Biography (online ed.). Oxford University Press. doi:10.1093/ref:odnb/5483. (Subscription, Wikipedia Library access or UK public library membership required.)
- Schaff, Phillip; Herzog, Jakob (1953). "Clarke, Adam". The New Schaff-Herzog Encyclopedia of Religious Knowledge. Vol. 3. Grand Rapids: Baker. p. 126.
- Tracy, Wesley (1981). When Adam Clarke preached, people listened. Kansas City: Beacon Hill Pr. of Kansas City.
