= Victor Shepherd =

Victor Shepherd (born 1944) is a Canadian Presbyterian minister, theology professor and author living in Toronto, Ontario. He is a critic of the theology of the United Church of Canada and acted as an expert witness in a case against the church.

== Biography ==
Shepherd was ordained into the United Church of Canada in 1970, and left that denomination in the late nineties and joined the Presbyterian Church in Canada. He has served four pastorates in New Brunswick and Ontario. He is the author of several books and journal articles.

Shepherd earned his Th.D. from Emmanuel College, University of Toronto, in 1978. In 1995 he was awarded an honorary doctorate from Roberts Wesleyan College in Rochester, N.Y., in recognition of his contribution to Wesley studies.

Shepherd was adjunct professor in the Department of Church History, Emmanuel College, University of Toronto, the Department of Religious Studies, McMaster University and the Department of Religious Studies, Memorial University of Newfoundland. A frequent lecturer, he has addressed learned societies both in Canada and abroad, such as the North American Calvin Studies Society and the Oxford Institute of Methodist Theological Studies. He holds the position of Professor Ordinarius at the University of Oxford.

Shepherd joined the Tyndale faculty in 1993 and is Professor of Systematic and Historical Theology at Tyndale University College and Seminary, and adjunct professor of theology at Toronto School of Theology (University of Toronto), supervising PhD comprehensive examinations and dissertations on themes related to the Protestant Reformation and to the tradition arising from it. At Tyndale University College and Seminary Victor Shepherd teaches courses in the history and theology of the Sixteenth Century Reformation, the theology of Wesley and the spirituality of the Puritans. In addition he teaches philosophy.

He has served on the board of the Peel Mental Health Housing Coalition and Pathway Community Developments, and is long-time advocate for the mentally ill and the underhoused. He belongs to the Canadian Philosophical Association, the Sixteenth Century Studies Society, the Canadian Methodist Historical Society, the Toronto Renaissance and Reformation Colloquium, the Writers' Union of Canada and PEN Canada.

== Selected publications ==
- Do you love me? And other questions Jesus asks / Toronto : Clements Pub., 2007. ISBN 1-894667-69-7
- Seasons of grace : pathways from wilderness to wonder / Toronto : Clements Pub., 2001. ISBN 1-894667-01-8
- Seasons of Grace Carp, Ontario: Creative Bound Inc., 1994. ISBN 0-921165-36-6
- Ponder and Pray Mississauga, Ontario: Light and Life Press Canada, 1993. 1984. ISBN 0-88622-177-3; reprinted in 2001. ISBN 1-894667-03-4
- So great a cloud of witnesses : profiles of 25 Christian "greats" Missauga, Ont. : Light and Life Press Canada, c1993. 87 p. : ports.; 22 cm. ISBN 0-919201-10-5
- Making sense of the Christian faith Toronto : Clements Pub., 2006. ISBN 1-894667-78-6
- The nature and function of faith in the theology of John Calvin Macon, Georgia : Mercer University Press, c1983. 248 p.; 26 cm. ISBN 0-86554-066-7
- Our evangelical faith. Toronto : Clements Pub., c2006. 79 p.; 22 cm. ISBN 1-894667-84-0 ISBN 978-1-894667-84-5
- Witnesses to the word : fifty profiles of faithful servants, 2001. ISBN 1-894667-00-X

== Reviews of Shepherd's books ==
- Free Methodist Church - Seasons of Grace by Victor Shepherd, Toronto: Clements, 2001, Reviewed by David Clarkson, The Free Methodist Herald
- Free Methodist Church - "Witnesses to the Word" reviewed by Gary R. Walsh, President of the Evangelical Fellowship of Canada
