= Edward Strutt (missionary) =

Edward Strutt (1853–1911) was a Wesleyan missionary who worked extensively in Sri Lanka in the latter part of the 19th century.

He was principal in 1877-1878 of Jaffna Central College.
