= Wesleyan Methodist Magazine =

Magazine

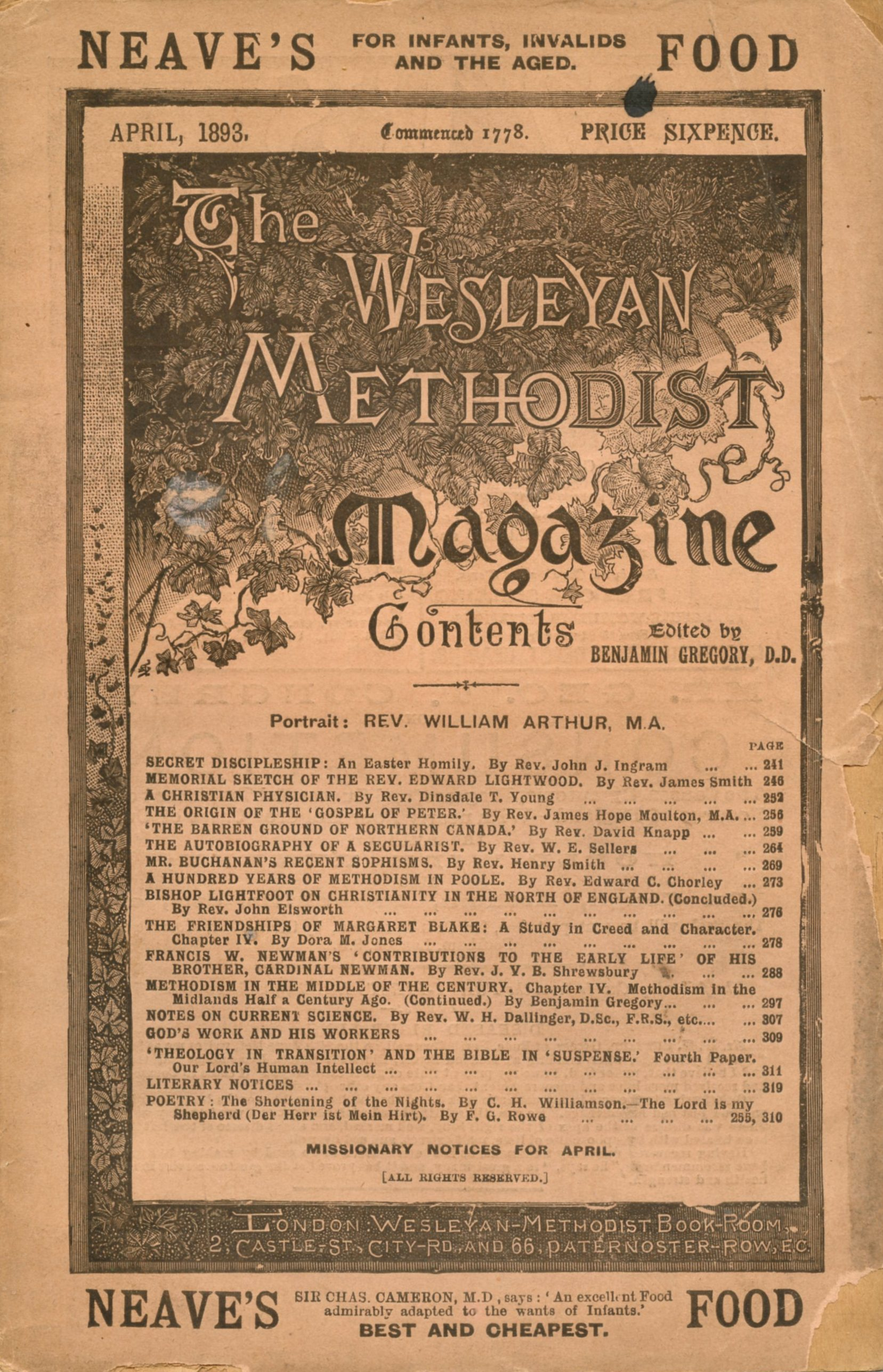
1893 issue of the Wesleyan Methodist Magazine, edited at the time by Benjamin Gregory

The Wesleyan Methodist Magazine was a monthly Methodist magazine published between 1778 and 1969. Founded by John Wesley as the Arminian Magazine, it was retitled the Methodist Magazine in 1798 and as the Wesleyan Methodist Magazine in 1822. The co-writer with Wesley (from 1775 to 1789) was Thomas Olivers.

As to why the magazine was originally entitled the "Arminian Magazine", W. Stephen Gunter says that in 1778 John Wesley

"... chose The Arminian Magazine as title for his Methodist magazine; and his intention in doing so was to distinguish his arm of the English revival movement from that of the 'Calvinian Methodists.' Wesley had not previously claimed this Arminian identity in a public way, ..."
