= Primitive Methodism in the United Kingdom =

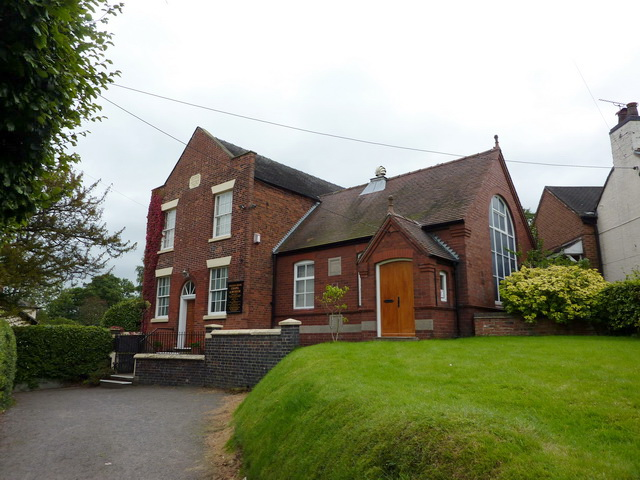
Englesea Brook Chapel and Museum, one of the oldest Primitive Methodist chapels. Since 1986 it has been a museum.

Primitive Methodism was a major movement in English and Welsh Methodism from about 1810 until the Methodist Union in 1932. It emerged from a revival at Mow Cop in Staffordshire. Primitive meant "simple" or "relating to an original stage"; the Primitive Methodists saw themselves as practising a purer form of Christianity, closer to that of the earliest Methodists. Although the denomination did not bear the name "Wesleyan" (unlike the earlier Wesleyan Methodist Church), Primitive Methodism was Wesleyan in theology, in contrast to the Calvinistic Methodists.

== Features ==
Primitive Methodists were marked by the relatively plain design of their chapels and their low church worship, compared with the Wesleyan Methodist Church. Their social base was among the poorer members of society, who appreciated its content (damnation, salvation, sinners and saints) and its style (direct, spontaneous and passionate). It was democratic and locally controlled, as compared with the more middle-class Wesleyan Methodists and the establishment-controlled Church of England, which were not democratic in governance. Even so, it was too formal for some adherents, who moved on to Pentecostalism. Growth was strong in the mid-19th century, but declined after 1900 with the growing secularism in society, competition from other Nonconformisms such as William Booth's Salvation Army, a resurgence of Anglicanism among the working classes, and competition among various Methodist bodies.

Gradually the differences between the Primitive Methodists and the Wesleyans lessened and the two denominations eventually merged with the United Methodists, to become the Methodist Church of Great Britain in 1932. In the United States, the Primitive Methodist Church has continued to this day, and some individual British Methodist churches also retain their Primitive traditions.

== Origins ==
A drawing of Hugh Bourne, one of the early Primitive Methodist leaders

Primitive Methodism originated in "camp meetings" held in the area of The Potteries at Mow Cop, Staffordshire, on 31 May 1807. This led in 1811 to a joining of two groups, the 'Camp Meeting Methodists' and the Clowesites led by Hugh Bourne and William Clowes, respectively.

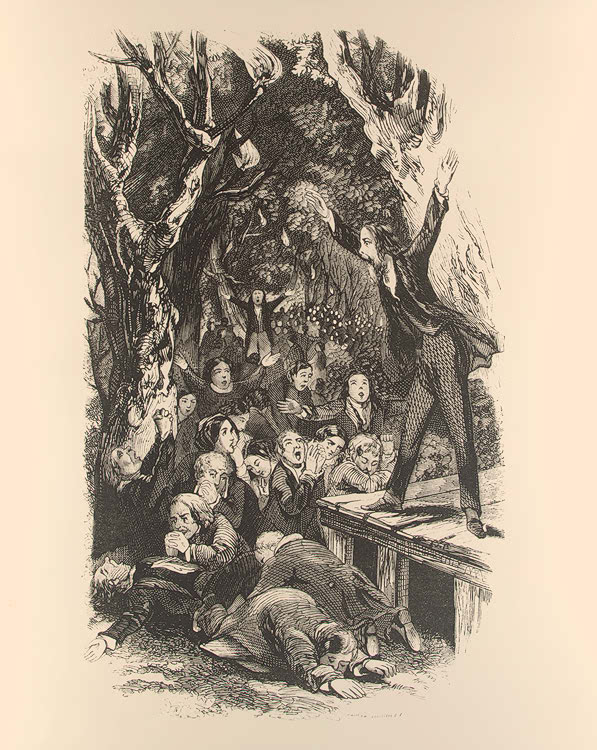
Lorenzo Dow preaching, engraving by Lossing-Barritt, 1856

Bourne and Clowes were charismatic evangelists with reputations for zeal and sympathy for ideas the Wesleyan Connexion condemned. Their least acceptable belief for the Wesleyan Connexion was support for the so-called camp meetings: day-long, open air meetings involving public praying, preaching and Love Feasts.

Clowes was a first-generation Methodist convert — at the age of 25 he renounced his desire to be the finest dancer in England. The movement was also influenced by the backgrounds of the two men: Clowes had worked as a potter while Bourne had been a wheelwright. Both had been expelled from the Wesleyan Connexion — Bourne in 1808, and Clowes in 1810. The reason given for Clowes' expulsion was that he had behaved "contrary to the Methodist discipline" and therefore "that he could not be either a preacher or leader unless he promised to attend no more Camp Meetings."

Moreover, Bourne's association with the American evangelist Lorenzo Dow appears to have caused other issues. The Wesleyan leadership's hostility to Dow is demonstrated by a threat Dow received from prominent Wesleyan Thomas Coke (twice president of the Conference, in 1797 and 1805) on his arrival in London about 1799. Coke threatened to "write to Lord Castlereagh to inform him who and what you are, [and] that we disown you,... Then you'll be arrested and committed to prison."

The Wesleyan Connexion was also concerned about Bourne and Clowes' association with the "Forest Methodists" led by James Crawfoot, the "old man of Delamere Forest". Crawfoot was significant to both Bourne and Clowes and was for a time their spiritual mentor. He held prayer meetings where people had visions and fell into trances. Crawfoot, according to Owen Davies, had developed a reputation for possessing supernatural powers. Indeed, Henry Wedgwood, writing later in the century, recalled that many locals at the time were terrified of the magical powers of an innkeeper called Zechariah Baddeley, but that they considered Baddeley's powers as nothing next to Crawfoot's prayers and preaching.

The enthusiasm associated with revivalism was seen as disreputable by the early 19th century establishment. In 1799, the Bishop of Lincoln claimed that the "ranter" element of Methodism was so dangerous that the government must ban itinerancy. The Wesleyan Methodists, such as Coke, wanted to distance themselves from such populism. The death of John Wesley removed a restraining influence on popular Methodism: there was no obvious leader or authority, and power was invested in the Wesleyan Conference. The Wesleyans formally split from the Church of England, which led to greater organisation and self-definition. The leadership could then withhold the tickets of members like Bourne and Clowes, who did not behave in the way expected by the Conference. The result was less tolerance for internal dissent and weakening of the movement's leadership.

The Camp Meeting Methodists looked back to the early days of the Methodist movement, when field preaching was acceptable. Despite their exclusion from the Connexion, Clowes and Bourne and assistants who appeared to help them became involved in a task which The Romance of Primitive Methodism saw as a work of primary evangelisation. The same book also regards the Primitive Methodist denomination as an independent growth rather than as an offshoot of mainstream Methodism. In fact, since Bourne and Clowes, had already been removed from Wesleyan Church membership, some time before The Society of Primitive Methodists was formed in 1812, and without having had, prior to their memberships being revoked, the intention of starting a distinct denomination, the Primitive Methodist Connexion, as it afterwards became, cannot therefore be labelled as a schism from a parent body.

== Response to the political situation ==
The leadership of the newly formed Methodist Church was made particularly sensitive to criticism by international events. Britain had been involved in almost perpetual war with France since 1793. A succession of defeats to allies and the threat of the "Continental System" increased tension at home.

The establishment faced a threat from the revolutionary anti-monarchical beliefs of the French government. The war and the French Revolution encouraged a fear of a rebellion in Britain. The repressive laws enacted by the second Pitt ministry came from fear of internal dissent.

In this atmosphere the Methodist leadership feared repression and strove to avoid antagonising the government. The Methodist movement challenged the Church of England — an institution widely regarded as a bulwark of national stability. As Hugh McLeod highlights, Methodist members and preachers could be outspoken in their criticism of the Church of England. The movement grew rapidly, especially amongst the expanding working classes.

The combination of rapid growth, popular appeal, and enthusiasm alarmed many. Fear of the Methodist membership seems to have been shared to an extent by the Wesleyan leadership. Dr Coke even suggested he would not be surprised if, "in a few years some of our people, warmest in politics and coolest in religion, would toast… a bloody summer and a headless king."

The leadership reacted to criticism and their own fears by introducing further discipline. They expelled the prominent Alexander Kilham in 1795, and one year later they forbade any itinerant from any publishing without the sanction of the newly created book committee.

From 1805 the use of hymnals not issued by the Book Room was banned, and in 1807 Camp Meetings were condemned. Through discipline they hoped to evade the tarnish of disloyalty.

The leadership reacted badly to Lorenzo Dow and Bourne's association with him. Dow was a republican and a millenarian. He made wild anti-establishment speeches and drew no distinction between religion and politics. In a tract of 1812, he preached: "May not the 'Seventh Trumpet' now be sounding, and the 'seven last plagues' be pouring out?" Dow accused the British government of tyranny and repugnance to God's laws of nature. As a separate church, conscious of their own public image and fearing repression, they felt they had to disassociate themselves from him. The Wesleyan leadership's measures to evade repression led to greater internal discipline. Members who were seen as a liability were expelled. Views that were anti-establishment were condemned.

== Wesleyan propaganda ==
The Wesleyan leadership did not seek to improve its reputation with discipline alone. Through propaganda it capitalised on a greater level of discipline in an attempt to reform its image. Hempton claims the Methodists used propaganda to project an industrious and well disposed image. The Methodist Magazine printed supportive tracts about the monarchy, praising the King's wariness of reformers. The movement was portrayed as a conservative force, with the leadership claiming Methodism promoted "subordination and industry in the lower orders". In promoting this image of Methodists, the Wesleyan leaders also sought to escape old slurs. One obstacle to Methodist respectability was its association with ignorance and superstition. In Wales in 1801, the leadership warned its members against involvement in sorcery, magic, and witchcraft. In 1816, 50 members of the Portland Methodist Society were struck off for maintaining belief in the supernatural. This demonstrates that the Wesleyan transition to denominational conservatism resulted in less toleration for alternate beliefs and non-bourgeois beliefs. So the association of Bourne and Clowes with Crawfoot was unacceptable to the leadership. It also suggests a gulf between the outlook of the Wesleyan leadership and the Methodist rank and file.

== Disillusionment with Wesleyan leaders ==
There was disillusionment with the Wesleyan leadership's conservatism and with financial policies. The reaction of the Yorkshire membership to its support of the government after Peterloo is illustrated by a rumour that it had "lent the government half a million of money to buy cannon to shoot them with". When a local preacher in North Shields criticised the actions of the magistrates at Peterloo, he faced criticism from itinerants and "respectable friends". The leadership judged, however, that it could not afford to expel this preacher because of the support he commanded locally. The incident showed that the leadership was not representing the interests and views of some Methodists. Its policies frequently clashed with poorer Methodists. In efforts to raise money, it introduced weekly and quarterly dues, yearly collections, the payment of class and ticket money, and seat rents. Such fees bore severely on the poor in the war years and the subsequent depression, opening a gulf between richer and poorer members. Seat rents marginalised a chapel's poor, while exalting the rich. The poor were often relegated to the least popular part of the chapel, and their involvement was implicitly devalued. At one of the earliest chapels, Walpole Old Chapel in Suffolk, attendance had once been an act of pride in the face of social superiors, but now reinforced inferiority. Such developments led to the disillusionment of rural Methodists. The poor contributions of many rural societies to the Connexion funds led to pastoral neglect. To illustrate the disillusionment of many, a pamphleteer in 1814 said, "You complain the preachers never call to see you unless you are great folks.... Well you may see the reason; you can do nothing for them; money they want and money they must and will have."

== What was at stake ==
The crucial factor was that the events came at a time when the movement had more to lose than ever before. Its withdrawal from the Church of England made chapel building and a larger ministry a necessity, while the Connexion also invested in schools, pension funds and foreign missions. Hard work and clean living had allowed many Methodists to increase their wealth and own property. All this could be lost to a fearful wartime government or a baying mob.

The Wesleyan "clergy" derived its income from the Church and had a vested interest in ensuring a conservative policy. It was easier for men from the lower sorts, artisans like Bourne and Clowes. Bourne was a successful businessman (a carpenter whose contacts included supplying pit-props for local coal mines) and Clowes was a master potter, who had worked his way up from working in potteries as a young boy and married into the Wedgwood family. They both had considerable education, though not at university like John Wesley, but through their own hard work earning a living. Did they have less to lose? What counted for them was a sensed call of God to continue the evangelistic work of John Wesley. In taking the name "Primitive Methodist", the Prims looked back to the original and unspoiled Christianity of both John Wesley and (Wesley's reference) of the Book of Acts. By contrast to the academic treatises on Primitive Methodism, original Primitive Methodist sources included definitive histories by Holliday Bickerstaffe Kendall, early biographies of Hugh Bourne like that by Jesse Ashworth from personal acquaintance, and Joseph Ritson's classic The Romance of Primitive Methodism. These illustrate a vibrant movement which the establishment was unwilling to entertain, due partly to weariness of persecutions in the 18th century, and to political upheavals after the French Revolution and various wars in which Britain was engaged. In fact Bourne was much concerned that things be done decently and in order, and worked hard to build up the official (Wesleyan) Methodist Circuit of which he had once been a member. He had founded and built at least one Chapel, largely at his own expense, given to the Circuit. It was the issue of Camp Meetings, which Bourne and his companions saw as blessed by God, that led to their expulsion. They had not sought to found a new denomination or put revivalism ahead of expediency. So the Primitive Methodist movement can be seen as a reaction to the Wesleyan drive towards respectability and denominationalism.

== Similarities and differences ==
The structure of the Primitive Methodists, though broadly similar to the Wesleyan Connexion, showed some pronounced differences. Both Primitives and Wesleyans employed a connexion system, employing a combination of itinerant and local preachers. Both included an array of local, circuit, district, and connexion officials and committees. According to James Obelkevich, Primitive Methodism was more decentralised and democratic. Julia Werner concurs that the movement was decentralised. Most decisions and day-to-day policy were decided at a local level. The circuits were virtually autonomous and their administration was not dominated by church officials, but by the laity.

The expansion of the movement through commissioning new missions was directed by individuals or circuits, not by a central authority. Decisions affecting the whole movement were taken at annual meetings. Even these were highly democratic, with the laity outnumbering the itinerants in voting power. The "church" could not dictate policy to its members. Compare the expulsions of Kilham from the Wesleyans (1795) and an outspoken "malcontent" from the Primitive Methodists (1824). While Bourne had to engage in a long and difficult argument before winning a vote, Dr Coke rejected a democratic decision-making process. In the early years of Primitive Methodism the membership had considerable power and freedom.

Although the Wesleyans tended towards respectability, Primitives were poor and revivalist. According to J. E. Minor, Primitive Methodist preachers were less educated and more likely "to be at one with their congregations" or even "dominated by them". Primitive Methodist preachers were plain-speaking, in contrast to Wesleyan services "embellished with literary allusions and delivered in high-flown language". Primitive Methodist preachers were plainly dressed and poorly paid. Though Wesleyan ministers in 1815 could command about £100, a house and a horse, the Primitive Methodist superintendent of the Gainsborough circuit received £62 12s in 1852. The second minister at the Gainsborough circuit received £36, about as much a farm labourer. If Primitive Methodist preachers lacked money, they were expected to turn to the Lord for support. There was also a disparity in the wealth of congregations. The Wesleyan ones were more likely to be from a lower middle class or artisan, background than the Primitive Methodists. Primitive Methodists were most likely to be small farmers, servants, mill workers, colliers, agricultural labourers, weavers and framework knitters.

The Primitive Methodists exalted its poor congregations by glorifying plain dress and speech, for two reasons: they thought plain dress was enjoined by the Gospel, and because it made them distinctive. In a time when Wesleyans sought assimilation and respectability, they wanted to stand out as a "peculiar people". The Primitive Methodist movement made a virtue out of difference.

=== Preaching and revivalism ===
The Primitives were more likely to go against society's norms. This is indicated in the Primitive Methodists' maintenance of revivalism. They were visible and noisy; they made use of revivalist techniques such as open-air preaching.

Their services involved a fanatical zeal that Wesleyan leaders would have found embarrassing. The hymns they sang were strongly marked by popular culture and not seen as respectable. They were often sung to popular tunes and full of references to Heaven as a place of opulence. As Werner comments, their hymns were a contrast to the "more staid hymns sung in Wesleyan chapels". All their members were seen as equal and addressed as brother or sister; even children could participate fully. Many children actually became preachers, for instance boy preachers such as Thomas Brownsword, Robinson Cheeseman and John Skevington. There were also many girl preachers, such as Elizabeth White and Martha Green, who preached as 15-year-olds.

The Wesleyan Conference condemned female ministry in 1803, so effectively closing its doors to female preaching. Women were limited to working in Sunday Schools and speaking at "Dorcas Meetings". By contrast, Primitive Methodism allowed the poor, the young, and women to gain public lay influence. Mary Dunnell was preaching from before the formation of the Primitive Methodists in 1807 and Sarah Bembridge was preaching in 1813 or 1814 at Sutton on the Hill.

The Primitive Methodists engaged with popular beliefs in presenting God as one whose powers could be called upon by preachers. Examples were published in the Primitive Methodist Magazine. For instance, the December 1824 edition contains an anecdote of a cripple being healed through her conversion to Primitive Methodism. The November edition from the same year contains a chapter on "raising the dead" under the title A Treatise on the Cultivation of the Spiritual Gifts. The Primitive Methodist Magazine of 1821 asserting that the movement had begun "undesigned of man" and was an example of "Divine Providence". The magazine continues to reveal further examples of God's power and favour towards them. A man who set out against the Primitive Methodists was struck down by illness, and a preacher who became lost and stranded was saved when the Lord sent people to find him.

The leadership believed in what many would deride as superstition. Clowes claimed to have fought with the Kidsgrove Boggart as a young man and Bourne believed in witches. About a woman he met at Ramsor, Bourne wrote, "I believe she will prove to be a witch. These are the head labourers under Satan, like as the fathers are the head labourers under Jesus Christ.... For the witches throughout the world all meet and have connection with the power devil." The magazine finds exaltations of the laity to be important at Camp Meetings. For instance, it reports that at Sheshnall in 1826, a woman fell to the ground under the purifying power of the Lord, and another cried aloud.

In the 1870s Stewart Hooson was a notable Primitive Methodist circuit preacher.

=== Common factors ===
The Primitive and the Wesleyan Methodists had much in common. They were both initially very anti-Catholic. Their social background was not completely different. There were many poor Wesleyans. It was in influence that middle-class Wesleyans dominated the movement, not in numbers. Many Wesleyans did not agree or abide by official policy. Many were sympathetic to revivalism and popular culture. The existence of an alternative sect, Primitive Methodism, did not end dissent.

In official policy and outlook the two movements had much in common. They both centred their teaching on the Bible and shared a similar outlook on society and morality. The Primitives were more radical than the Wesleyan Methodists. Armstrong claims Thomas Cooper found the Primitive Methodists "demurred to [his] reading any book but the Bible, unless it was a truly religious book." Likewise, both wanted to reform popular behaviour. Again the Primitives were more radical than the Wesleyans and less in keeping with bourgeois correctness. Bourne was not just in favour of temperance, he disagreed with alcohol altogether and thought of himself as the father of the teetotal movement. The Primitive Methodists were a religion of popular culture. While the Wesleyans attempted to impose elements of middle-class culture on the lower classes, Primitive Methodists offered an alternate popular culture. They timed their activities to coincide with sinful events. For instance, they vied against the race week at Preston by organising a Sunday School children's parade and a "frugal feast". Both tried to inculcate the doctrine of self-help into the working class. They promoted education through Sunday Schools, though the Primitives distinguished themselves by teaching writing. Through a combination of discipline, preaching and education both Primitive and Wesleyan Methodism sought to reform their members' morality.

By 1850 the Primitives and Wesleyans were showing signs that they could surmount their differences. Primitive Methodism was mellowing. It was less distinctively non-middle-class by 1850 and more in keeping with social norms. Less emphasis was placed on the supernatural. In 1828 Bourne said of trances, "This thing still occasionally breaks out. It is a subject at present not well understood and which requires to be peculiarly guarded against impropriety and imposture." Hymns about hell were sung less frequently. The Providence section of the Primitive Methodist Magazine declined in importance and was dropped altogether in 1862. The revivalist enthusiasm of the Primitive leadership dimmed. Even Clowes, once an ardent enthusiast, became "convinced that religion does not consist in bodily movements, whether shouting, jumping, falling, or standing."

Although Primitive Methodism had had a tradition of roving women preachers, women were never ordained into any formal church offices. In 1828, it was also clarified that women could not serve as superintendents, and in mid-century there ceased to be biographies eulogising female preachers in the Methodist Magazine. Elizabeth Bultitude, the last of the women roving preachers died in 1890.

In time, services became marked by decorum and the ministry increasingly professional. The dress code was dropped in 1828 and preaching became more urban based. The community's values were more in line with middle-class respectability: Parkinson Milson reported that local preachers and class leaders were offended at his plain speech.

=== Convergence begins ===
In the 1820s the Primitive Methodists were showing signs of increased conformity. At the same time the Wesleyan Methodists were relaxing their opposition to revivalism.

In 1820 the Conference permitted an altered form of camp meeting but gave it a different name. Wesleyan preachers adopted door-to-door techniques and in 1822 there were numerous open-air meetings. The official Wesleyan attitude was not only softening in regard to Primitive Methodist revivalist techniques. It was also softening in regard to the Primitive Methodist promotion of non-worldliness. The Methodist Magazine printed a series of articles "On the Character of the Early Methodists". The magazine praised their "plain dress" and "simplicity of manners". This represented an attempt to re-engage with the poor. By 1850, both Primitive and Wesleyan Methodists were finding that their differences were less significant and passionate.

In 1864 the Primitives established Elmfield College in York.

The Primitives were becoming more like the Wesleyan Methodists. Their leaders became more conservative as they got older. They showed signs of moving away from revivalism and intending to impose greater discipline on the membership. They experienced some schisms in the 1820s. These Primitive Methodist troubles were blamed on the admission of "improper" preachers and "questionable characters". The problems in the 1820s were often related to money matters. A decision by the conference of 1826 to impose tighter financial discipline on the circuits led to an exodus of members and 30 itinerants. The movement became more geared towards consolidation through greater organisation. In 1821 preachers were called upon to record their activities and in 1822 a preachers' manual was published. Preachers now had guidelines, an element of accountability had been introduced, and the leadership had stated that the connexional accounts had priority over spreading the word.

== Methodist Union ==
In 1932 the Primitive Methodist Church merged with the Wesleyan Methodist Church and the United Methodists to form the Methodist Church of Great Britain. The Primitive Methodist Church was represented at the merging denominations' Uniting Conference by William Younger, who had been elected President that year.

== Bible ==
The early Primitive Methodists were committed to the inerrancy and infallibility of the Bible, something which the Primitive Methodist Church of the USA still holds today. This American denomination is contiguous with the original PM movement from the UK, having become an independent Conference in 1840.

However, in the UK, as the confidence and growth of the movement began to wane, and the new "higher criticism" became popular in certain academic circles, leading PM theologians like Arthur Peake, Professor of Biblical Criticism at University of Manchester in 1904–1929, popularized modern, secular biblical scholarship. He, like many others enamored by the critical methodology of their day, approached the Bible not as the infallible word of God, but as a record of revelation written by fallible humans.

== Organisation and conferences ==
In Scotland the Primitive Methodists were poorly funded and had trouble building churches and supporting ministers. Organisationally, the Prims followed many Wesleyan precedents, including grouping local societies into Circuits, and from 1824, grouping Circuits into Districts. By 1824 there were 72 Circuits and four Districts — Tunstall, Nottingham, Hull, and Sunderland.

From 1820, the Primitive Methodists held an annual conference, which was nominally the church's ultimate legal authority. (Note: The 1932 Deed of Union, concerned with the merger which formed the Methodist Church of Great Britain, refers to "the Annual Assembly or Conference".) However, from 1843 to 1876 the District Meetings grew in power and popularity at the expense of Conference (Lysons: 22 and ch. 4).

Conference venues included:

Year + Conference venue

- 1820 Hull
- 1821 Tunstall
- 1822 Loughborough
- 1823 Leeds
- 1824 Halifax
- 1825 Sunderland
- 1826 Nottingham
- 1827 Manchester
- 1828 Tunstall
- 1829 Scotter
- 1830 Hull
- 1831 Leicester
- 1832 Bradford
- 1833 Sunderland
- 1834 Birmingham
- 1835 Tunstall
- 1836 Lynn Regis
- 1837 Sheffield
- 1838 Darlaston
- 1839 Bradford
- 1840 Manchester
- 1841 Reading
- 1842 Newcastle on Tyne
- 1843 Nottingham
- 1844 Lynn Regis
- 1845 Hull
- 1846 Tunstall
- 1847 Halifax
- 1848 Leeds
- 1849 Sunderland
- 1850 Nottingham
- 1851 Yarmouth
- 1852 Sheffield
- 1853 York
- 1854 Manchester
- 1855 Hull
- 1856 Darlaston
- 1857 Cambridge
- 1858 Doncaster
- 1859 Newcastle on Tyne
- 1860 Tunstall
- 1861 Derby
- 1862 Sheffield
- 1863 Leeds
- 1864 York
- 1865 Hull
- 1866 Chester
- 1867 Luton
- 1868 Sunderland
- 1869 Grimsby
- 1870 Nottingham
- 1871 Oldham
- 1872 Yarmouth
- 1873 London
- 1874 Hull
- 1875 Leicester
- 1876 Newcastle on Tyne
- 1877 Scarborough
- 1878 Manchester
- 1879 Leeds
- 1880 Grimsby
- 1881 Hull
- 1882 Sheffield
- 1883 South Shields
- 1884 Tunstall
- 1885 Reading
- 1886 Derby
- 1887 Scarborough
- 1888 Liverpool
- 1895 Colerne
- 1905 Scarborough

== Gallery ==
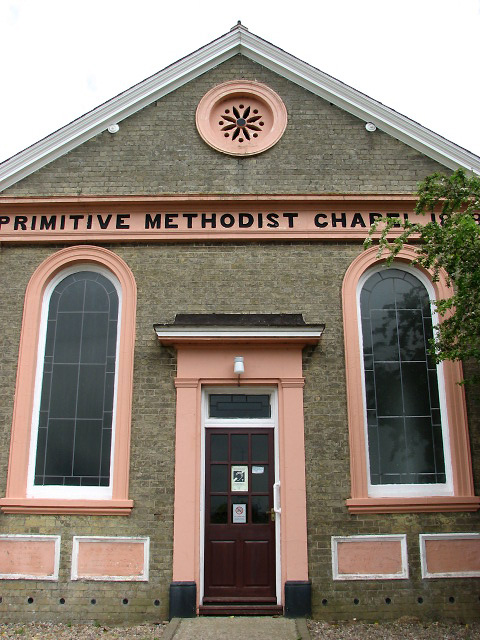
Former Primitive chapel in Halvergate

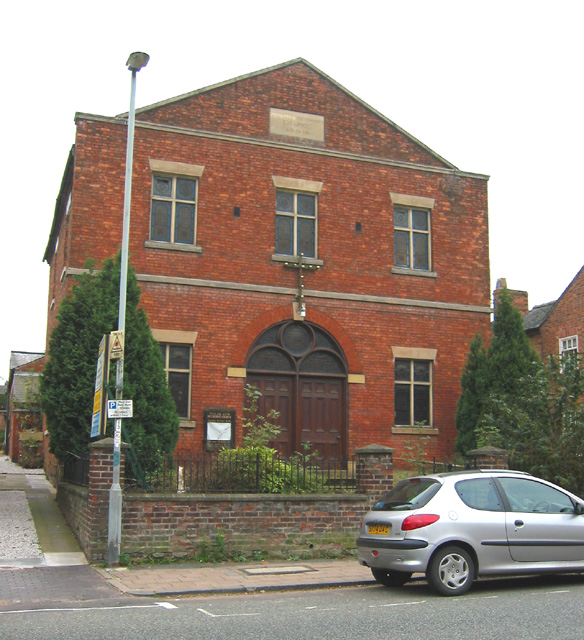
A former Primitive chapel, Nantwich, Cheshire

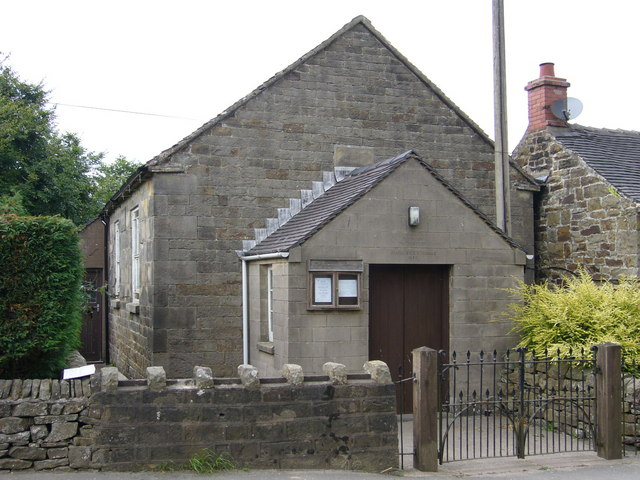
A former Primitive chapel in Onecote, opened in 1822.

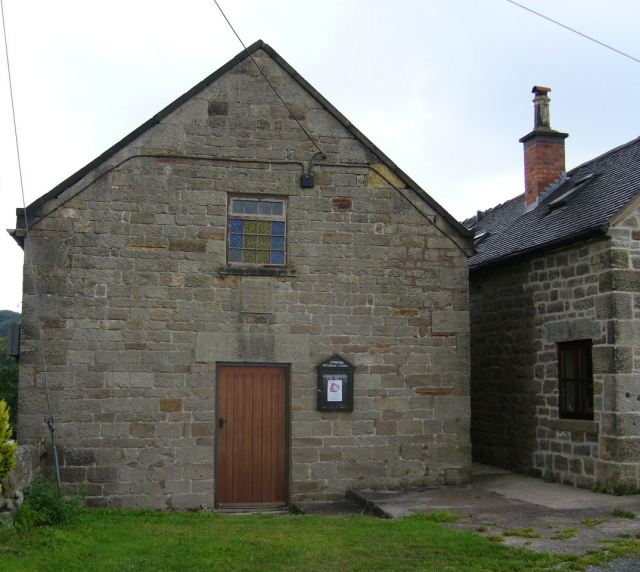
A former Primitive chapel in Stanton, opened in 1824. Early Primitive Methodist buildings were very plain.

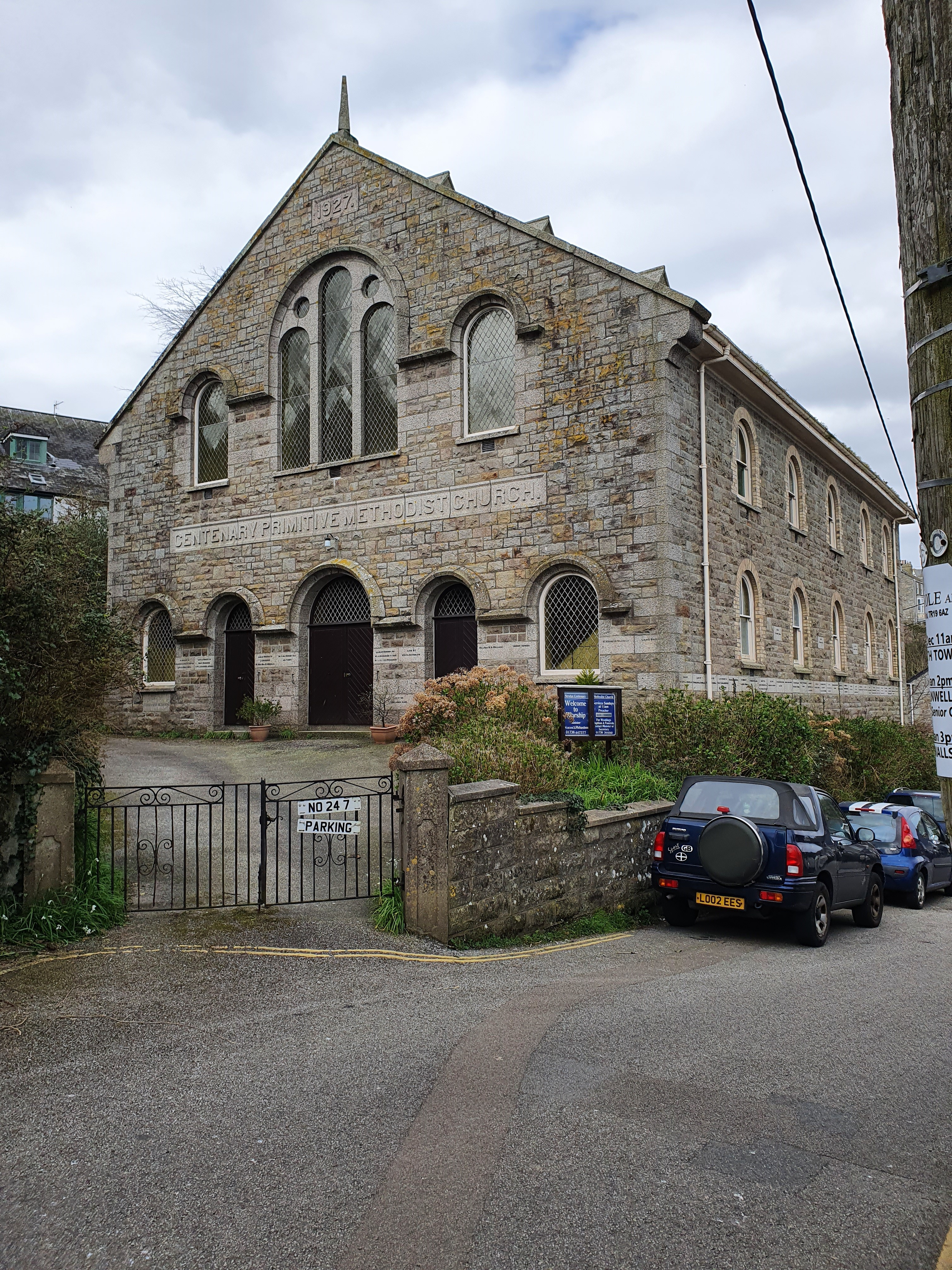
Centenary Primitive Methodist Church in Newlyn, opened in 1835

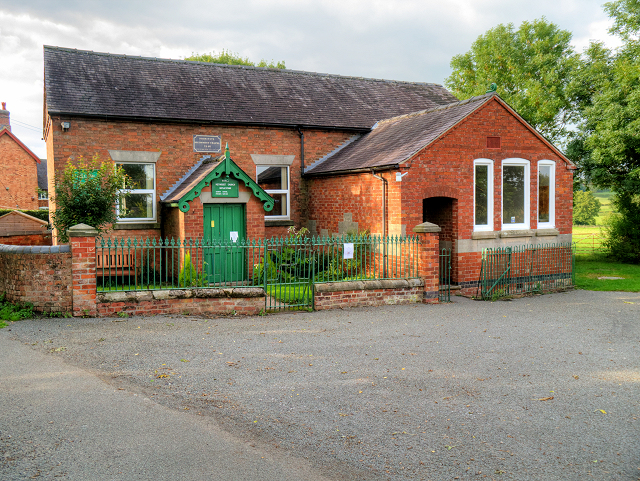
Bourne Methodist Church in Boylestone, opened in 1847. Boylestone was one of the earliest centres of Primitive Methodist activity.

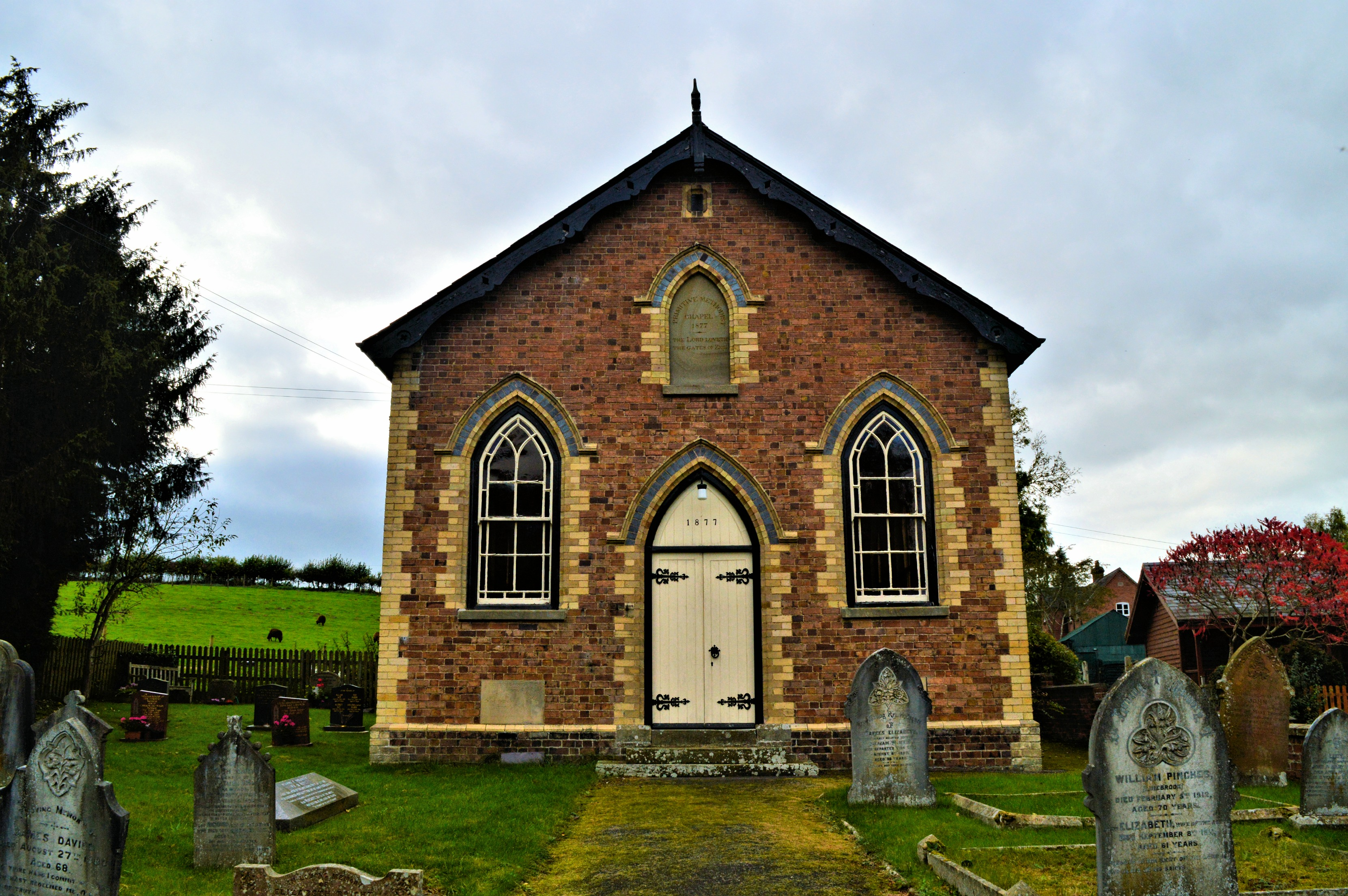
Former Primitive Methodist chapel with a churchyard, opened in 1877

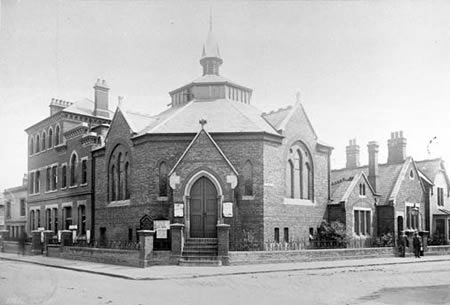
The former Rotunda in Aldershot in Hampshire, opened as a Primitive chapel in 1876 and demolished in the 1980s

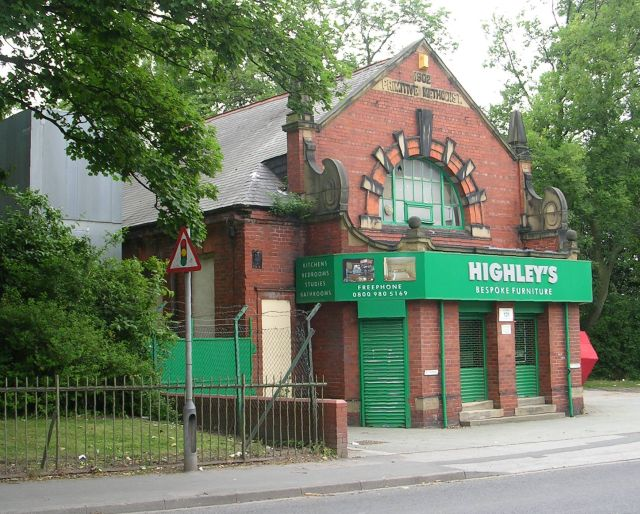
A Primitive chapel built in 1902, now a furniture store

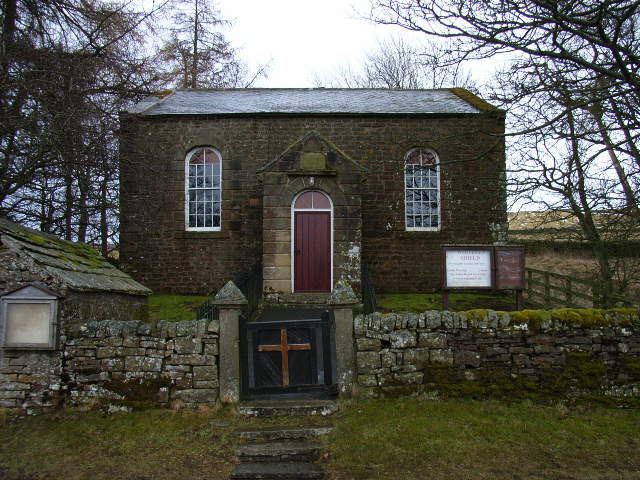
Whiteley Shield Methodist chapel, originally a Primitive Methodist chapel, in Allendale, Northumberland

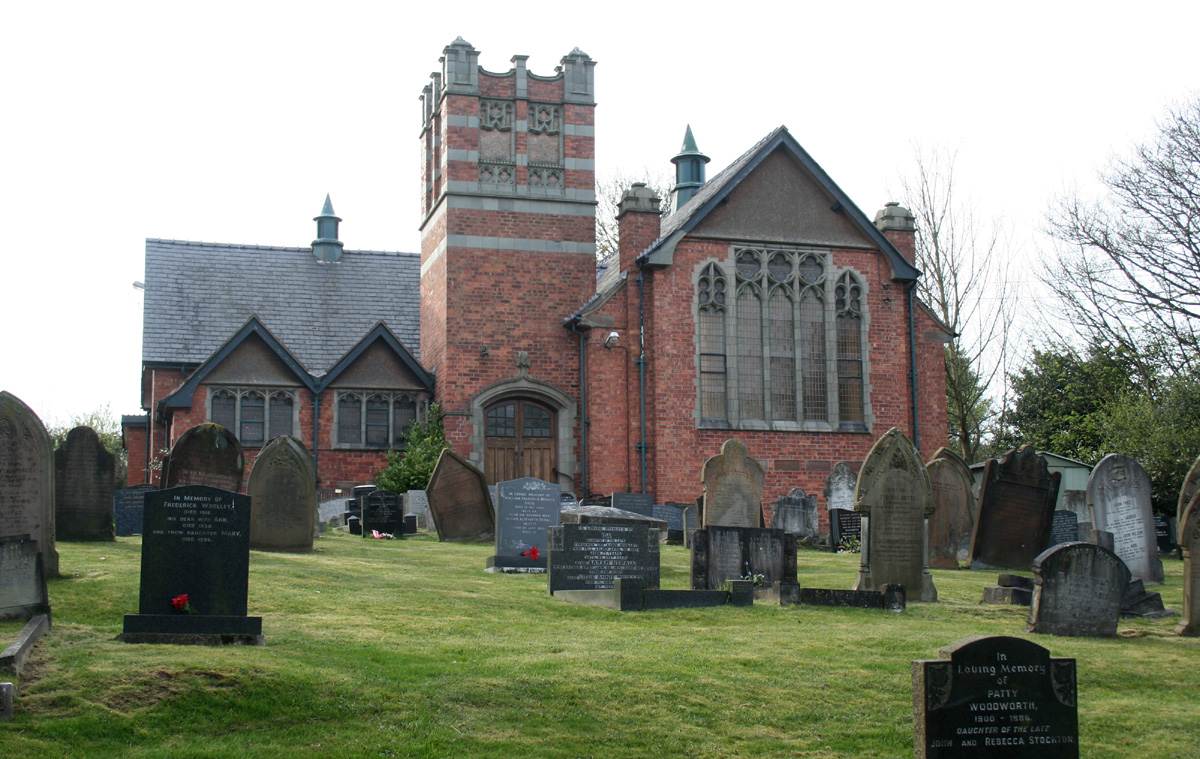
Brown Knowl Methodist Church, originally opened as a Primitive Methodist chapel in 1913

== See also ==
- History of Christianity in Britain
- United Brethren (England)
