= Ramshorn =

Hamlet in Staffordshire, England

Coordinates: 53.0052°N 1.876°W

- Location within Staffordshire
- OS grid reference: SK084453
- Shire county: Staffordshire
- Region: West Midlands
- Country: England
- Sovereign state: United Kingdom
- Post town: STOKE-ON-TRENT
- Postcode district: ST8
- Police: Staffordshire
- Fire: Staffordshire
- Ambulance: West Midlands

The tiny hamlet of Ramsor (Methodist spelling) in north Staffordshire played a significant part in the origins of Primitive Methodism. Listed in the Domesday Book as Ramshorn, this ancient hamlet is a typical example of the depopulation of the countryside. Very little now remains of this village apart from a few farms and cottages. The Primitive Methodist Chapel is the only surviving public building.

Ramsor, spelling the name as it was pronounced, is the usual spelling in Primitive Methodist documents while Ramshorn is still the official spelling. The variant spellings will be used here to distinguish these.

== Ramsor ==
=== Ramshorn ===
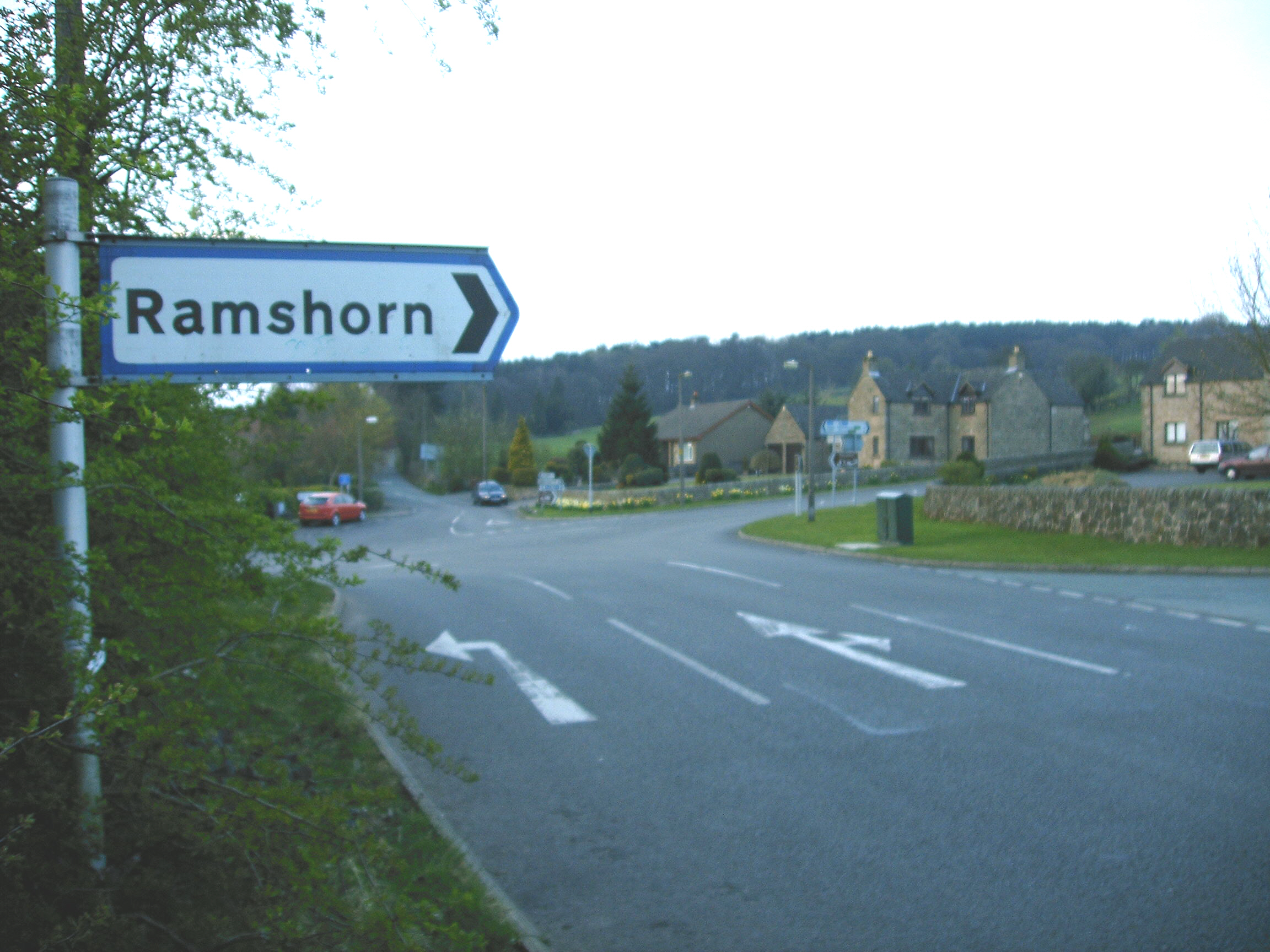
Signpost to Ramshorn from a junction near Cotton on the route to Alton Towers

Ramshorn is mentioned in the Domesday Book, and this gives the official standard spelling used in maps, road signs, censuses, etc. Only a few farms and houses are left, but the fact of being in the Domesday Book means that Ramshorn is shown on maps when larger places are not.

Ramshorn is in the Parish of Ellastone, about 3 miles west of Ellastone village, about 2 miles north of the more famous landmark, Alton Towers, and south of the Weaver Hills. It lies in the border between the gentler lower valley of the River Dove, Derbyshire-Staffordshire border, and the more rugged Staffordshire Moorlands. A substantial area of the village is now within the J C Bamford estate. This includes the site of the school, which is now completely demolished.

The falling population of Ramshorn illustrates well the general move from the countryside to towns and cities. A factor in the urbanisation of Britain was increasing demand for manpower in mills and factories, coupled with changes in agriculture requiring reduced manpower. Some once thriving villages like Ramshorn are reduced to almost nothing. This decline in rural population may be traced from census records.

=== Ramsor in Primitive Methodist history ===
Though often backstage to the Potteries (Stoke on Trent), Ramsor and its people played a major part in the origins of Primitive Methodism. This includes

- First Ramsor Camp Meetings held in 1808
- Camp meeting here on 3 June 1810 where the speakers include Mary Dunnell
- William Clowes expelled from the Wesleyan Methodists after attending a Camp Meeting at Ramsor.
- Hugh Bourne's first funeral sermon for a Ramsor young woman in 1810.
- The first Primitive Methodist Class Ticket paid for by a Ramsor farmer in 1811.
- Ramsor became a "Head of Circuit" in 1822 having been a "Head of Section" in the Tunstall Primitive Methodist Circuit. The Cheadle and Leek (in 1838) Primitive Methodist Circuits were largely carved out of the Ramsor Circuit.

(Some members of the Ramsor Primitive Methodist Society lived in surrounding hamlets, such as Wooton, but are for convenience included in this article as Ramsor people.)

In later years, however, the Ramsor Circuit required financial support from the District Home Missions Fund. To a large extent, this was a result of the depopulation of the countryside. Even so, the influence of Ramsor people in Primitive Methodism is remarkable for so small a place. Following the Methodist Union of 1932, the name of Ramsor was included in the Methodist Circuit name, The Ramsor And Uttoxeter Circuit until the 1970s when the Circuit name was changed to The Dove Valley Circuit.

==== Ramsor Primitive Methodist Chapel ====
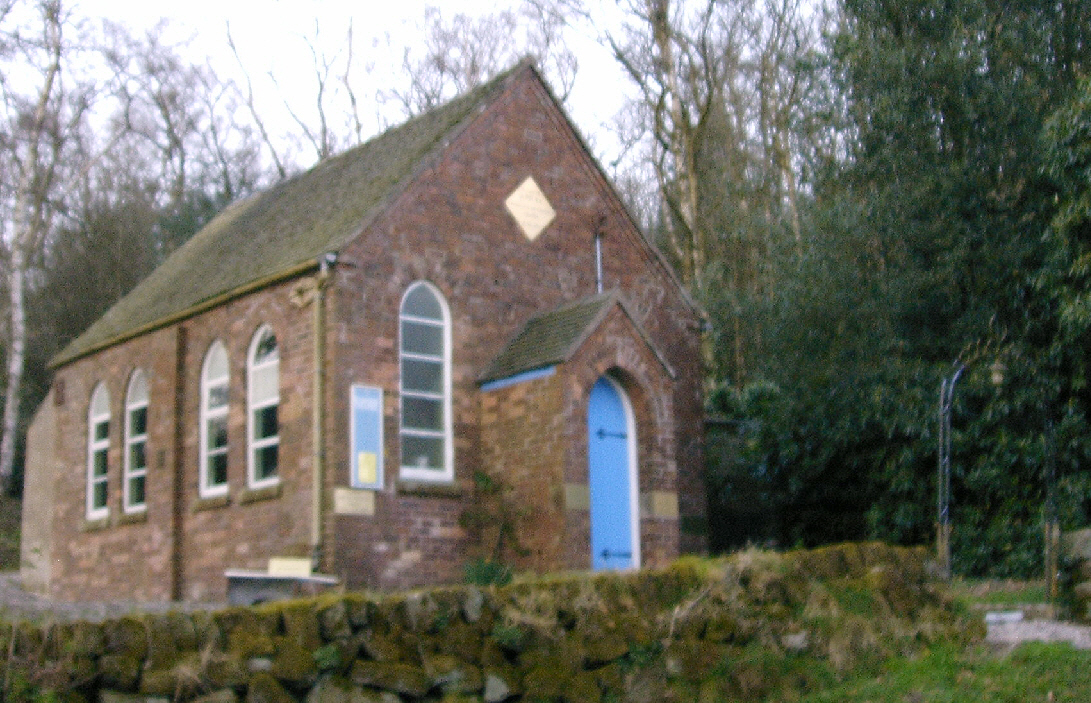
Ramsor Jubilee Chapel after restoration

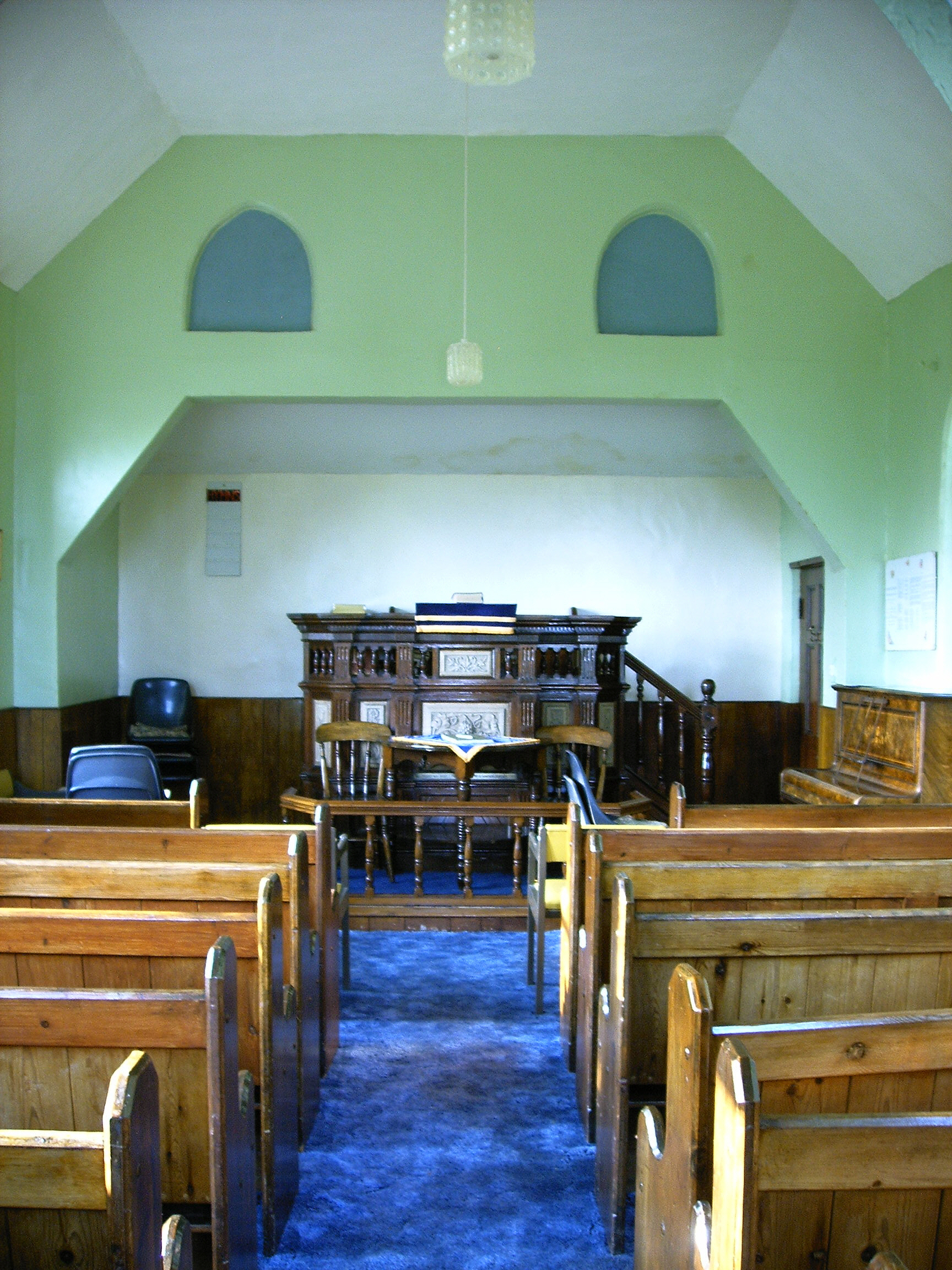
Ramsor Jubilee Chapel from the main entrance, showing the pulpit

The Primitive Methodist Chapel is the main if not the only building other than farms and dwellings to survive from the 19th century. It is now in private ownership, and has been lovingly restored as a place of worship where services are occasionally held e.g. 3 December 2006 and 31 May 2007. The second occasion was the conclusion of a walk from Mow Cop to Ramsor on the bicentenary of the first Primitive Methodist Camp Meeting. The present pulpit is not the original, but one rescued from a similar chapel at Gun End, near The Roaches to the north of Leek, Staffordshire. This looks as if it had been purpose-built for Ramsor Chapel. The lighter panels are wood carvings.

The present Chapel is the Jubilee Chapel, built to commemorate Queen Victoria's Golden Jubilee in 1887. It stands across the road from Chapel Farm, in the grounds of which stood the first Chapel.

==== Hugh Bourne ====
Ramsor is frequently mentioned in Hugh Bourne's writings, and it is obvious from these that he frequently visited the village. His first visit was in May 1808 He uses examples of Ramsor people quite frequently in his articles in the Primitive Methodist Magazine to illustrate both doctrine and general Christian life. For example, he gives an example from Ramsor of the healing of Elizabeth Wain from 6 years using crutches amongst several examples of miraculous healing.

Ramsor was the place of Hugh Bourne's first funeral sermon. This is described in his article "Anecdote of a Present Salvation in which he writes of the teaching of John Wesley on this subject. As an example, he relates the experience of Elizabeth Warrington, whose conversion in March 1810 was due to her meeting with Bourne. She died in November 1810, having shown very clear evidence of her faith in spite of a long illness. In the summer of 1810, Bourne had been persuaded to doubt the reality of "present salvation", but was persuaded by Elizabeth's life that what Wesley had taught was true.

==== William Clowes ====
Following his conversion in January 1805, William Clowes's preaching was testimony and "exhortation". The Ramsor Camp Meeting of 9 October 1808 was the first time he "preached from a text". When in September 1810 he was put out of membership of the Burslem Wesleyan Circuit for "attending Camp Meetings", it followed his attendance on an impulse of the June 1810 Ramsor Camp Meeting. Ironically, Clowes attended only 5 of the 17 Camp Meetings from the first at Mow Cop on 31 May 1807 to the establishment of Primitive Methodism in 1811.

==== Richard Jukes ====
Richard Jukes was one of the most popular of all the Primitive Methodist Travelling Preachers, and a prolific hymn writer. At a time when most Travelling Preachers stayed only one or two years in any one place, Jukes spent 4 years at Ramsor, summer 1834 to 1838. Perhaps his best known hymn is "My Heart is fixed Eternal God"

==== Camp meetings and other events ====
Holliday Bickerstaffe Kendall says that there were five Ramsor Camp Meetings up to 1811, these being on 4 September and 9 October 1808, 21 May 1809, 3 June 1810, and 26 May 1811.

In 1808 Francis Horrobin guided Hugh Bourne to villages which were "spiritually destitute". Later, Horrobin paid for the printing of the first primitive Methodist Class Tickets, issued 30 May 1811.

Places named on the Preaching Plans of the Ramsor Circuit include Mixon and Ecton. These are example of the "industrial mission" activities of the Primitive Methodists. Both were mines, Mixon being south east of Leek, and Ecton being in the Manifold Valley. As well as a famous copper mine, Ecton also had a creamery and cheese factory, and a lead mine, and was an important station on the Leek and Manifold Light Railway. Postcards from around 1900 – 1910 show the chapel. At this time this was a Primitive Methodist chapel, but during the 19th century both the Primitive and the Wesleyan Methodists (from nearby Wetton) had regular preaching there. Hugh Bourne's first evangelism had been amongst coal miners around Harriseahead, and this interest in working people was characteristic of the Primitive Methodists.

== See also ==
- Listed buildings in Ramshorn
