= Richard Jukes =

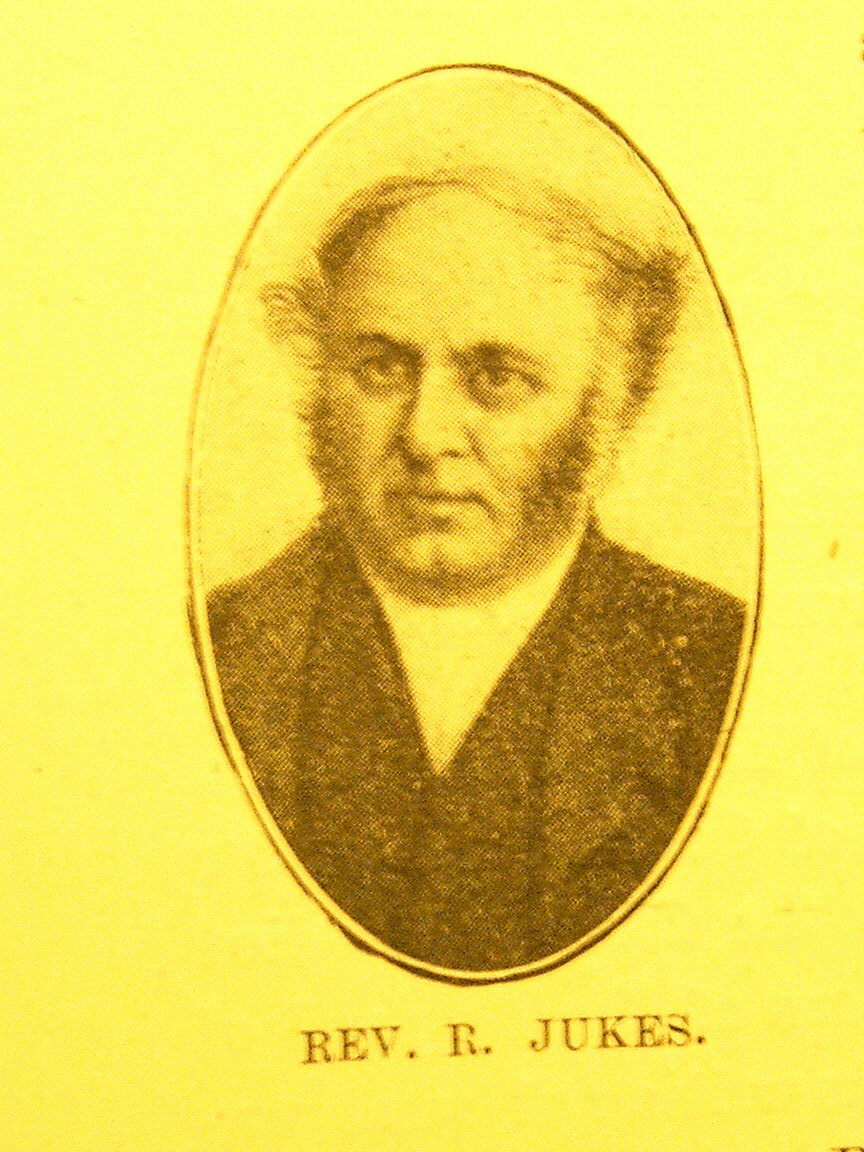
Rev. Richard Jukes

Rev. Richard Jukes (1804–1867) was a popular Primitive Methodist minister and hymn writer. This article provides a brief biography, and a summary of his work as a popular minister and hymn writer during the first half-century of Primitive Methodism.

== Biography ==
Richard Jukes was born on 9 October 1804 at Goathill, and died on 10 August 1869. He served as a Primitive Methodist minister from 1827 to 1859. Jukes married Phoebe Pardoe in 1825, and later, widowed, he married Charlotte.

=== Circuits ===
- 1827 – Hopton Bank
- 1828 – Brinkworth
- 1829 – Brinkworth (6 months)
- 1829 – Motcombe (6 months)
- 1830 – Pillowell
- 1831 – Salisbury
- 1832 – Birmingham
- 1833 – Nottingham
- 1834 – Ramsor
- 1838 – Darlaston
- 1842 – Tunstall
- 1845 – Congleton
- 1846 – Dudley
- 1849 – Darlaston
- 1851 – Brierley Hill
- 1853 – Coventry
- 1855 – West Bromwich
- 1859 – West Bromwich (retired)

== Work as a minister ==
While Richard Jukes left his mark in Kendall's history as a hymn writer, his work as a minister was widely appreciated. It is noteworthy that, after a number of appointments where he would have been the junior, Jukes was appointed to three of the most significant Circuits of that time. Tunstall, Staffordshire was the place of origin of Primitive Methodism and Ramsor had been almost as significant. Darlaston was very much the leading light in the Black Country. Jukes spent a large part of his active ministry in The Black Country and retired there.

Hugh Bourne reveals a special interest in Ramsor in his writings in The Primitive Methodist Magazine, through the way he illustrates articles with anecdotes of Ramsor people.

== Hymns ==
Holliday Bickerstaffe Kendall says of Richard Jukes, “although he was a prolific and popular hymn-writer of his day, is in some danger of being forgotten.” The major biography of Jukes has the title "Poet of a Million", reflecting this claim to fame. Kendall also says, “Jukes’ hymns have been sung from one end of the Connexion to the other, by tramps in the street and Christians in the chapels; and the late Dr. Massie says, the hymn entitled “What’s the news,” &co., has been sung and repeated in the great Revival in Ireland.”

=== Hymn tunes ===
Part of the genius of Richard Jukes the hymn writer was his ability (shared with other Primitive Methodists including Henry Higginson) to use the best popular melodies of his time. A contemporary account by a Jonathan Ireland in Lancashire will be useful to researchers into 19th-century hymns.

Before the Primitive Methodists came to this city (Manchester), and for some time after, it was very common to hear lewd or ribald songs sung in the streets, especially on the Lord’s day. But our movements drove them away by putting something better in their place. We used to pick up the most effective tunes we heard, and put them to our hymns; and at our camp meetings people, chiefly young ones, used to run up to hear us, thinking we were singing a favourite song. But they were disappointed therein; nevertheless, they were arrested and often charmed by the hymn, which at times went with power to their hearts. And so the words of the hymn put aside the words of the song. It will show the utility of singing lively hymns in the streets; yea, more particularly, it will show the use to society in general of our hymn singing in the streets, if I here relate a fact which was told me by a friend on whose veracity and accuracy I can place reliance. He said : “I was one day in a hair-dresser’s shop in a country village, when a man came in to be shaved, having a handful of printed hymns, which he had been singing and selling in the streets. I entered into conversation with him, in course of which he said : “Your Jukes has been a good friend to us street-singers; I have sung lots of his hymns, and made many a bright shilling thereby. People generally would rather hear a nice hymn sung, than a foolish song, – and his hymns are full of sympathy and life. Depend on it, the singing of hymns in the streets has done a good deal of good; for children stand to listen to us, and they get hold of a few lines, or of the chorus; and with the tune, or as much of it as they can think of, they run home, and for days they sing it in their homes, and their mothers and sisters get hold of it, and in this way, I maintain, our hymn-singing is of more use than many folks think. I shall always think well of Jukes,” concluded the man.

=== The hymn "Christ for me" ===
Much of Jukes’ output seems to have been published in special collections. Unfortunately, his writing was not used in many hymn books, and the only hymn to have survived in common use is “Christ for me”. Even this was not used in the 1882 Primitive Methodist Hymnal, but only in the 1911 Supplement. As an example of Jukes' hymns, here is the version used in the 1911 Supplement. Other verses have been sung.

My heart is fixed eternal God,
Fixed on Thee : Fixed on Thee :
And my immortal choice is made :
Christ for me.
He is my Prophet, Priest and King,
Who did for me salvation bring;
And while I’ve breath I mean to sing :
Christ for me. Christ for me.

2 In Him I see the Godhead shine;
Christ for me. Christ for me.
He is the Majesty Divine;
Christ for me.
The Father’s well-beloved Son,
Co-partner of His royal throne,
Who did for human guilt atone;
Christ for me. Christ for me.

3 Let others boast their heaps of gold;
Christ for me. Christ for me.
His riches never can be told;
Christ for me.
Your gold will waste and wear away,
Your honours perish in a day;
My portion never can decay;
Christ for me. Christ for me.

4 In pining sickness or in health,
Christ for me. Christ for me.
In deepest poverty or wealth,
Christ for me.
And in that all-important day,
When I the summons must obey,
And pass from this dark world away,
Christ for me. Christ for me.

R. Jukes

== Notes ==
1. Very few copies have survived, one being at the library of the Englesea Brook Chapel and Museum of Primitive Methodism.
2. Kendall (op. cit.) writes, “One evening, when the eccentric Henry Higginson was on his way to a tea meeting at Walsall, he heard a lad singing a song which attracted him. “Here, my lad, sing that again and I’ll give thee a penny.” The lad did as he was told, more than once. “Here you are, my man,” said Higginson, throwing him the penny; “I’ve got the tune and the devil may take the words.”
