= Sarah Bembridge =

English Primitive Methodist preacher

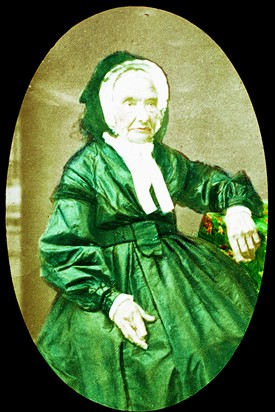
- she lost fingers as a child
- Born: Sarah Kirkland; 12 August 1793; Mercaston
- Died: 4 March 1880 (aged 86); Alfreton
- Other name: Sarah Harrison
- Occupation: itinerant preacher
- Known for: evanglising for the Primitive Methodists
- Spouses: John Harrison; William Bembridge

Sarah Bembridge, born Sarah Kirkland; also named Sarah Harrison (12 August 1793 – 4 March 1880) was an English Primitive Methodist itinerant preacher who established a reputation before the church was formally founded. She established the church in Nottingham and extended its reach in Derby. She made a significant impact in Hull, but she decided to establish herself back in her home village of Mercaston in Derbyshire.

== Life ==
Bembridge was born in 1793 in Mercaston in Derbyshire. Her Wesleyan Methodist parents were Sarah (born Daykin) and Rowland Kirkland who hosted services in their house. William Bramwell was one of the leading preachers of the Wesleyan's and he had a strong effect on Sarah. The Wesleyan's became less active in Mercaston but they were replaced by the Primitive Methodists. In 1811 Bembridge met co-founder Hugh Bourne in 1811 and two years later she met William Clowes who was the other. 1813 was an eventful year as she lost two brothers and her father to smallpox and she formally joined the Primitive Methodists.

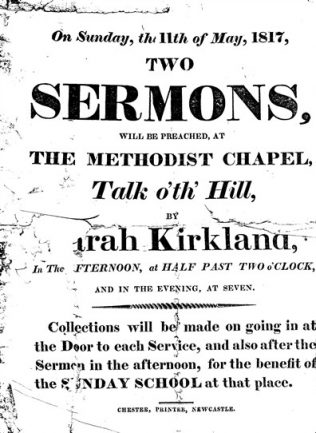
Sarah Kirkland to preach in 1817 at Talke in Staffoldshire

She took her first service at Sutton on the Hill and was soon preaching across Staffordshire and Derbyshire. At Christmas 1815 she was chosen to be the first Primitive Methodist to preach in Nottingham by Robert Winfield. Winfield was a farmer in the small south Derbyshire village of Ambaston and he was known for evangelising new areas. She had run a "lovefeast" in Ambaston for Winfield where she was persuaded to go on to preach in Chaddesden - soon there was another preaching circuit in Derby.

In 1818 she married John Harrison who had been a Primitive Methodist since 1811 and he was credited with establishing that church in Leicestershire. In 1819 they both went to Hull to work with William Clowes until John's health gave way. She was pregnant when they returned to Derbyshire in May 1820. John died in 1821 and she remarried another preacher William Bembridge in 1825. She would continue to preach in Mugginton, although there were requests for her to return to Hull. Bembridge died in 1880 in Alfreton in Derbyshire.
