= Mary Dunnell =

Scottish woman executed for witchcraft in 1658

- Born: 1700s
- Died: 1800s
- Occupation: Preacher

Mary Dunnell (fl. 1807–1811) was a preacher who joined the early Primitive Methodists briefly leading "Mrs Dunnell's people" in Derbyshire.

== Life ==
Dunnell's life before 1807 is unknown apart from her being from Macclesfield and from accusations made by Hugh Bourne in 1811. In 1807 Dunnell was invite to preach as the Methodist meeting in Tunstall in Staffordshire. It has been speculated that this was intended to distract her from attending the camp-meeting at Norton in August 1807. This invitation contravened the 1803 Methodist Conference directive that women should not be allowed to preach. Weeks later her followers had to arrange private meetings in someone's kitchen where she could preach as she was banned from the Tunstall pulpit. Hugh Bourne interceded, and he managed to get permission from the Bishop in Lichfield for her to speak on Friday evenings. He and Bourne had a tricky friendship. Bourne believed for instance that married love was defiling, whereas Dunnell disagreed entirely.

Bourne's supporters were known as 'Camp Meeting Methodists' and they were welcome inside the Methodists until 1811. After the Ramsor Camp on 3 June 1810 when Dunnell was one of the speakers, William Clowes was excluded from the Wesleyan Methodists.

In 1811, Bourne and his brother founded their first Chapel in Tunstall. Bourne visited Derbyshire where Dunnell was making good progress around Derby in Darley Moor and Rodsley near Ashbourne. Dunnell told him that she had a vision that their fellow preachers William Allcock and William Clowes had lost their faith and Bournes set off to see them. It is speculated that Dunnell invented the vision to leave herself in charge of what became known as "Mrs Dunnell's people". The Derbyshire followers were annoyed when Bourne returned later that year. He revealed that Dunnell was a bigamist as she had previously married three men. Dunnell was not heard of again and afterwards Bourne had to avoid Derbyshire for a couple of years.
