= Primitive Methodist Magazine =

The Primitive Methodist Magazine was the monthly magazine of the Primitive Methodist Church in Britain, spanning just over a century. It was started in 1821. From 1821, the Magazine was edited by Hugh Bourne, who printed the magazine at Bemersley Farm about 2 miles from Mow Cop. Production was moved to London in 1843 when John Flesher became the Editor. One of the more famous editors was H B Kendall, the writer of three major histories of Primitive Methodism.

The Magazine was initially produced as a paper cover booklet. These were later bound in annual volumes, of which the Englesea Brook Museum of Primitive Methodism has a complete set. Hugh Bourne's printing press is also amongst the exhibits at the Museum. The magazine existed until 1898.

== See also ==
- Methodist Recorder
