= Stewart Hooson =

English Methodist minister

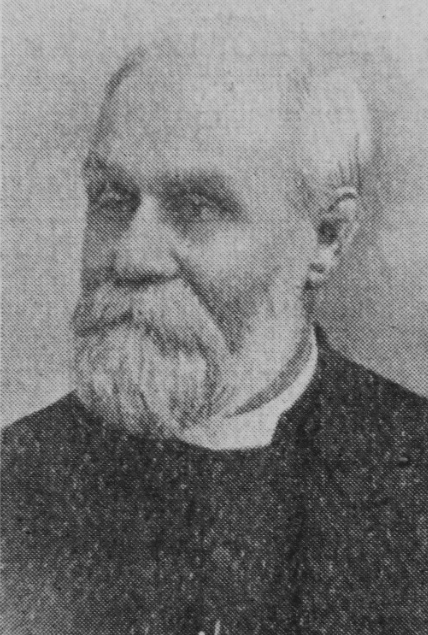
- Born: 27 December 1832; Halifax, Yorkshire
- Died: 6 August 1903 (aged 70); Eastleigh
- Occupation: Minister
- Spouse: Matilda Gillett (m. 1859) Mary Ann Humphries (m. 1880)

Stewart Hooson (27 December 1832 – 6 August 1903) was an English Primitive Methodist minister and circuit preacher who campaigned for temperance and vegetarianism.

== Career ==
Hooson was born in Halifax, Yorkshire. He became a Methodist at the age of seventeen and was placed on the reserve list of the ministry in 1855. He was first called to Witney Circuit of Primitive Methodists (1856) and worked as a circuit preacher at Leamington (1858), Rugby (1859), Winchester (1862), Cirencester (1865), Faringdon (1867), Hungerford (1872), Brinkworth (1879) and Southampton (1887). His salary on the Witney Circuit was small and he managed for two years and nine months on about 8s. 6d. per week. In 1900, he was minister at Chandler's Ford Primitive Methodist Chapel in Eastleigh.

In 1891 he was a delegate to the Ecumenical Conference at Washington in the United States. In 1901, he retired but was elected to remain at Eastleigh and assist his successor in ministry work. He was a temperance advocate and joined the United Kingdom Alliance soon after its formation and was president of its Cricklade division. Hooson was a pacifist and a supporter of the Liberation Society and Peace Society. He died in Eastleigh in 1903.

== Vegetarianism ==
Hooson became a vegetarian in the 1876 for health and religious reasons. He commented that "I have enjoyed splendid health, not having been laid aside a week during the whole of my ministerial life". He was vice-president of Southampton Vegetarian Society. In 1887, he lectured on vegetarianism in Southampton arguing that many diseases were traceable to an unreasonable amount of meat-eating.

== Personal life ==
He married Matilda Gillett (1826–1877) in 1859; they had five children. He married his second wife Mary Ann Humphries in 1880.
