= Methodist Recorder =

British weekly newspaper

Front page on 23 June 2017

The Methodist Recorder is an independent weekly newspaper that examines events and current affairs within the Methodist community in Britain and worldwide. It has been published continuously since 1861, absorbing its major rivals the Watchman in 1883, the United Methodist in 1932 and the Methodist Times in 1937.

== History ==
The newspaper was founded in 1861 at the initiative of six Wesleyan Methodist ministers: James Pond Dunn, Charles Garett, George T. Perks, William Morley Punshon, Gervase Smith and Luke Hoult Wiseman. Punschon was the first editor.

Following a number of church and school fires, such as the loss of Dr. Coke's Memorial Schools in Brecon (1890), a "Special Warning to Church Keepers" was published in the Recorder addressing issues of fire safety.

On 13 February 1992 the Recorder published its 7,000th edition, and the following year published its first April Fools' Day joke, claiming that there would be a "complete standardisation of Methodist worship" which would require local preachers to wear a "uniform" and be trained in clowning and juggling.

In 2010 the Recorder revamped its design and began to be published in full-colour. Its circulation was estimated at 20,000.

== Availability ==
Although not available online, the Recorder maintains a basic website offering subscription details and a brief outline of the newspaper's contents. A full archive in both bound copies and microfilm is available from the Methodist Studies Unit of the former Westminster College, Oxford, now part of Oxford Brookes University. Public access is available free of charge (by prior appointment) and a small charge is made for reproduction.

Paul Flowers was previously the art critic for the Recorder, writing the Gallery Notes column.

== See also ==
- Methodist Church of Great Britain
- Primitive Methodist Magazine
- Wesleyan Methodist Magazine, originally the Arminian Magazine, founded by John Wesley
