= Harriseahead =

Village in Staffordshire, England

Coordinates: 53.1003°N 2.2093°W

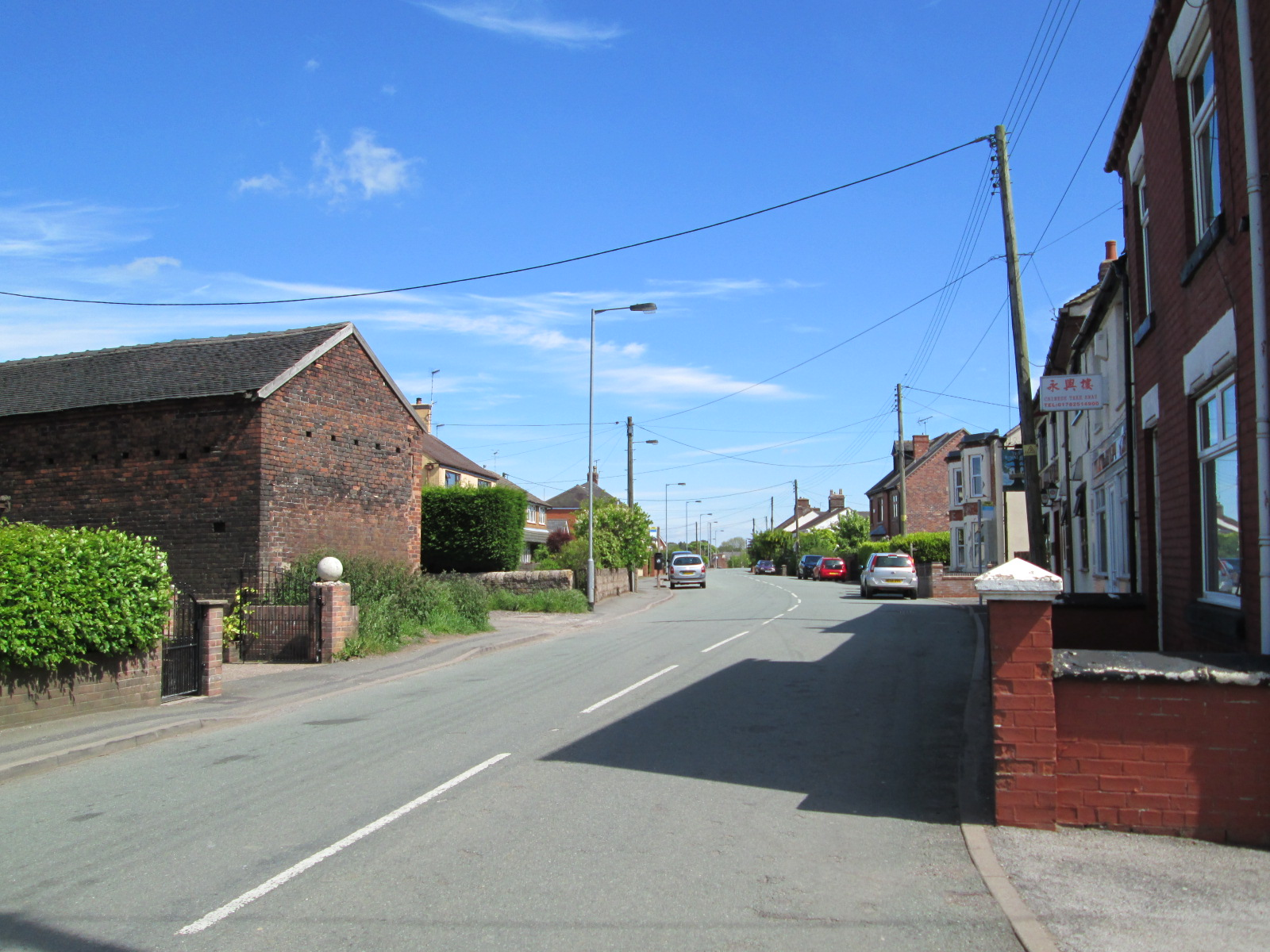
- High Street, Harriseahead

- Location within Staffordshire
- OS grid reference: SJ860559
- Civil parish: Kidsgrove
- District: Borough of Newcastle-under-Lyme
- Shire county: Staffordshire
- Region: West Midlands
- Country: England
- Sovereign state: United Kingdom
- Post town: Stoke-on-Trent
- Postcode district: ST7
- Dialling code: 01782
- Police: Staffordshire
- Fire: Staffordshire
- Ambulance: West Midlands
- UK Parliament: Staffordshire Moorlands

Harriseahead is a village in the civil parish of Kidsgrove, in the Borough of Newcastle-under-Lyme, in Staffordshire, England. It lies close to the county boundaries of Cheshire-Staffordshire.

It is close to the towns of Biddulph, Congleton and Kidsgrove. The village also forms a continuous urban area with the villages and hamlets of Brindley Ford, Brown Lees, Dales Green, Mow Cop, Newchapel, Packmoor and The Rookery. This also forms a huge part of the wider "Potteries" urban area with Kidsgrove and Stoke-on-Trent.

== History ==
The etymology is unknown; although the "-head" ending of the name, from Old English heafod indicates the village's high situation in the Staffordshire Moorlands.

Mow Cop Castle is on top of a hill just under a mile north of the village. It has been in the care of the National Trust since 1937, but has a history linking it with Methodism.

=== Harriseahead in 1841 ===
The census of 1841, showed that the village had a population of 578 persons, 303 of which were male and 275 of which were females. There were 111 separate dwellings, with an average occupancy rate of 5.28 persons per dwelling. Of the population only 35.8% were in work.

=== Links with Methodism ===
The link with Methodism came when Hugh Bourne moved to the village in 1800, having bought an oak woodland there to supply pit props in Stonetrough Colliery and other local mines. In 1801 to 1802 he built a Methodist Chapel which became the centre of Methodist activity in that area and beyond. The Primitive Methodist movement grew out of this.

The village used to have both a Primitive and Wesleyan Methodist Chapel, however a single functioning chapel remains in the form of the Methodist Memorial Chapel found on the corner of High Street and Chapel Lane. The Chapel continues to have its annual Anniversary Sermons and Flower Festival which are well received locally.

The chapel closed in October 2018, holding a final service which was very well attended.
