= Methodist Union =

1932 merger of Methodist denominations in the United Kingdom

Timeline of Methodist connexions in Britain

Methodist Union was the joining together of several of the larger British Methodist denominations. These were the Wesleyan Methodists, the Primitive Methodists, and the United Methodists. The process involved many years of negotiation and discussion, as well as a vote by the members of each denomination to approve the union. In 1932 a Uniting Conference met on 20 September in the Royal Albert Hall, London. It adopted the Deed of Union as setting forth the basis of union and declaring and defining the constitution and doctrinal standards of the Methodist Church, and a new Model Deed was executed.

After 1932, the new united body was known simply as The Methodist Church. To distinguish this from Methodism in other countries (chiefly the United States), it is styled the Methodist Church of Great Britain.

== The various Methodist denominations ==
The largest was the parent body, the Wesleyan Methodist Connexion, from which a number of offshoots had sprung. The Primitive Methodists were the second largest of these, having arisen in the first decade of the nineteenth century following the conversion of Hugh Bourne and a number of others in Staffordshire to the north of Stoke on Trent. They had sought to recover the early faith and practice of John Wesley at a time when the Wesleyans were hoping to become more respectable. Their return to Wesley's open-air preaching, notably in the form of camp meetings, did not suit the Wesleyans at that time, and Bourne was put out of membership along with several of his companions. Continuing their evangelism, they began the new group, a "connexion" in Methodist terminology, in 1811, taking the name Primitive Methodists in 1812.

The United Methodists were the other group involved in the 1932 union. This denomination was created by the United Methodist Church Act 1907, which united three existing organisations: the Methodist New Connexion (founded in 1797), the Bible Christian Church (formed in 1815), and the United Methodist Free Churches (formed in 1857).

The Methodist Union combined the 517,551 members of the Wesleyan Methodist Church with 222,021 followers of the Primitive Methodist Church, and 179,551 members of the United Methodist Church. The new connexion had 15,408 congregations, 4,370 ordained ministers, and 36,913 local preachers.

== Deed of Union ==
The Deed of Union adopted in 1932 has been amended by the Methodist Conference from time to time. It was last amended and its contents rearranged in 1990.

== Hymn Book ==
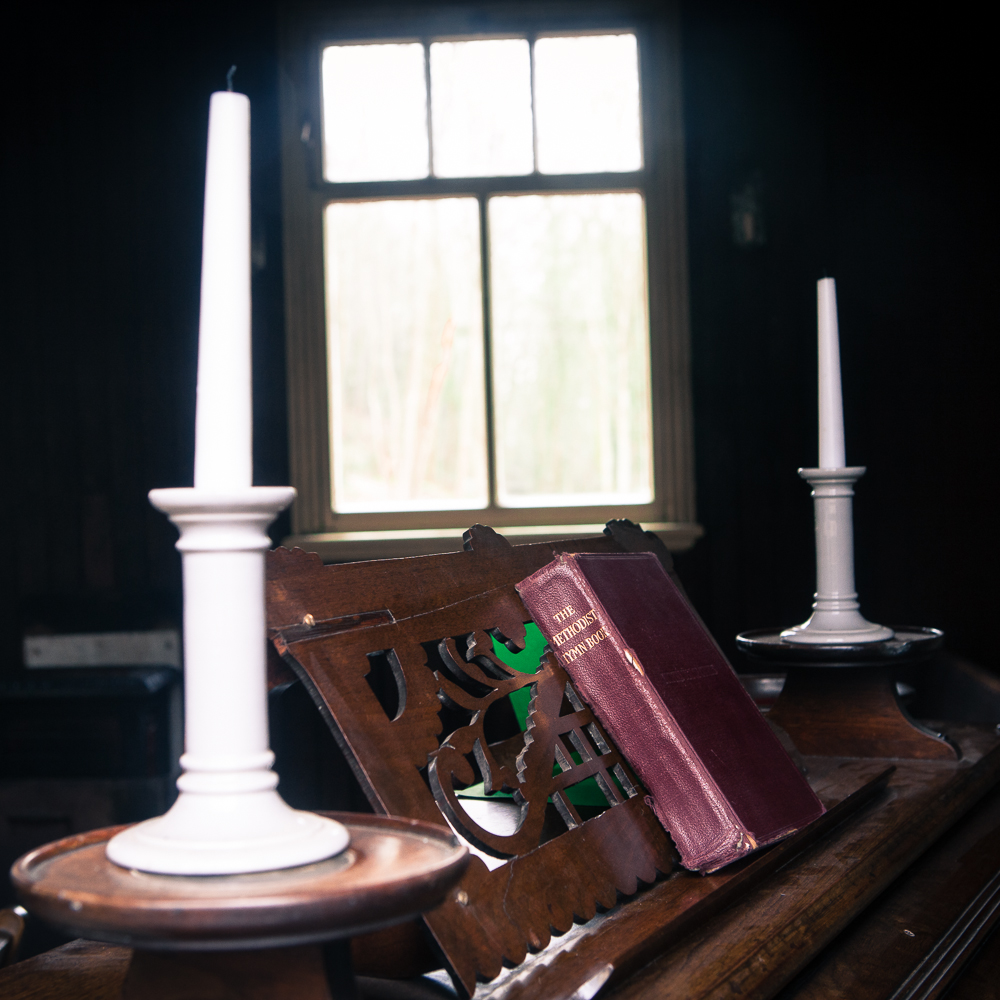
The Methodist Hymn Book

As a part of the Methodist Union, a new volume, The Methodist Hymn Book, was compiled and published in 1933. This included 984 hymns drawn from the various merging groups, as well as a selection of the Psalms. A separate version of the hymn book was also prepared for use in Australia and New Zealand, which appeared in 1935.

== See also ==
- Organisation of the Methodist Church of Great Britain
- List of Methodist denominations
- History of Christianity in Britain
