= Elizabeth Bultitude =

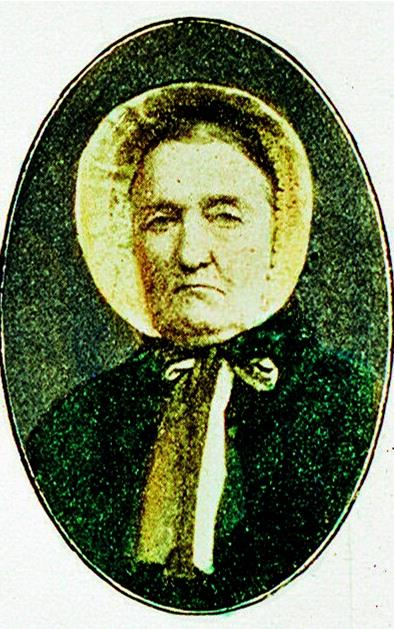
- Born: 12 August 1809; Shelton and Hardwick
- Died: 14 August 1890 (aged 81); Heigham
- Education: very little
- Known for: Primitive Methodist preacher

Elizabeth Bultitude (12 August 1809 – 14 August 1890) was a British Primitive Methodist preacher. When she retired after thirty years she was said to be their last itinerant woman preacher.

== Life ==
Bultitude was born in Hardwick in Norfolk. She came from a large Wesleyan Methodist family and they were poor. When she was thirteen her father died and the family moved to Norwich to find work. She went hungry. She had not eaten when she met Samuel Atterby and had a spiritual event. He was a Primitive Methodist, but she did not formally join that denomination until 1829 when another minister, John Smith, visited Norwich.

Bultitude's talents for preaching were spotted and she was given "a note" which gave her the church's authority to preach. She did not find it easy although she noted that in all of her time preaching she only failed to turn up on two occasions. In both cases it had been due to rain which meant that turnout would be poor and it was unwise to preach outside in torrential rain.

Male preachers were poorly paid and women preachers were paid just half of that amount. When she was preaching at Soham at 1847 she was criticised for the poor quality of her dress. In reply she noted that even if she spent all of her money on clothes then she would not be able to meet any standard of smart attire.

She retired in 1862. There were at least 40 itinerant women preachers and no one in the church gave them a senior position or paid them. Women did not stop preaching but Bultitude is considered to the last one who became itinerant to preach. After her the only authorised preachers were male. Bultitude was the last of a group of women who preached with authority. Her church did not prevent women being preachers - it just stopped authorising any more.

In 1881 she was living in a small street in Norwich. She was indulgent towards her drunken younger brother James who lived with his wife in the same street. He made a living as a fishmonger. She later moved to another small house.

Bultitude died in Heigham in 1890 after a long gruelling illness.
