= Holliday Bickerstaffe Kendall =

American Primitive Methodist Minister

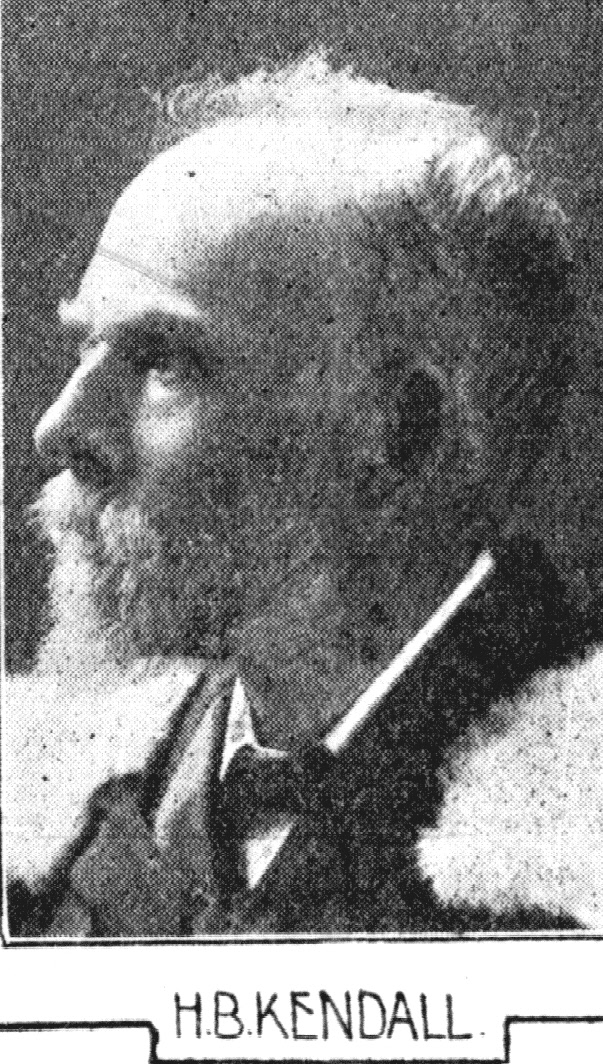
- Kendall in 1906
- Born: 2 August 1844; Wakefield, England
- Died: 10 March 1919 (aged 74); Bournemouth, England

Holliday Bickerstaff(e) Kendall (2 August 1844 – 10 March 1919), was a Primitive Methodist Minister, President of the Conference (1901). Editor (Primitive Methodist publishing), author and historian, Kendall wrote three separate histories of the Primitive Methodist Church which came to be regarded as the definitive history of the Church.

== Biography ==
He was born on 2 August 1844 at Wakefield. He was the only child of Rev Charles Kendall and Sarah Bickerstaffe. He was named after a friend of the family, Rev. Thomas Holliday, and his mother's family, Bickerstaffe.

He served as a Primitive Methodist Minister from 1864 to 1903.

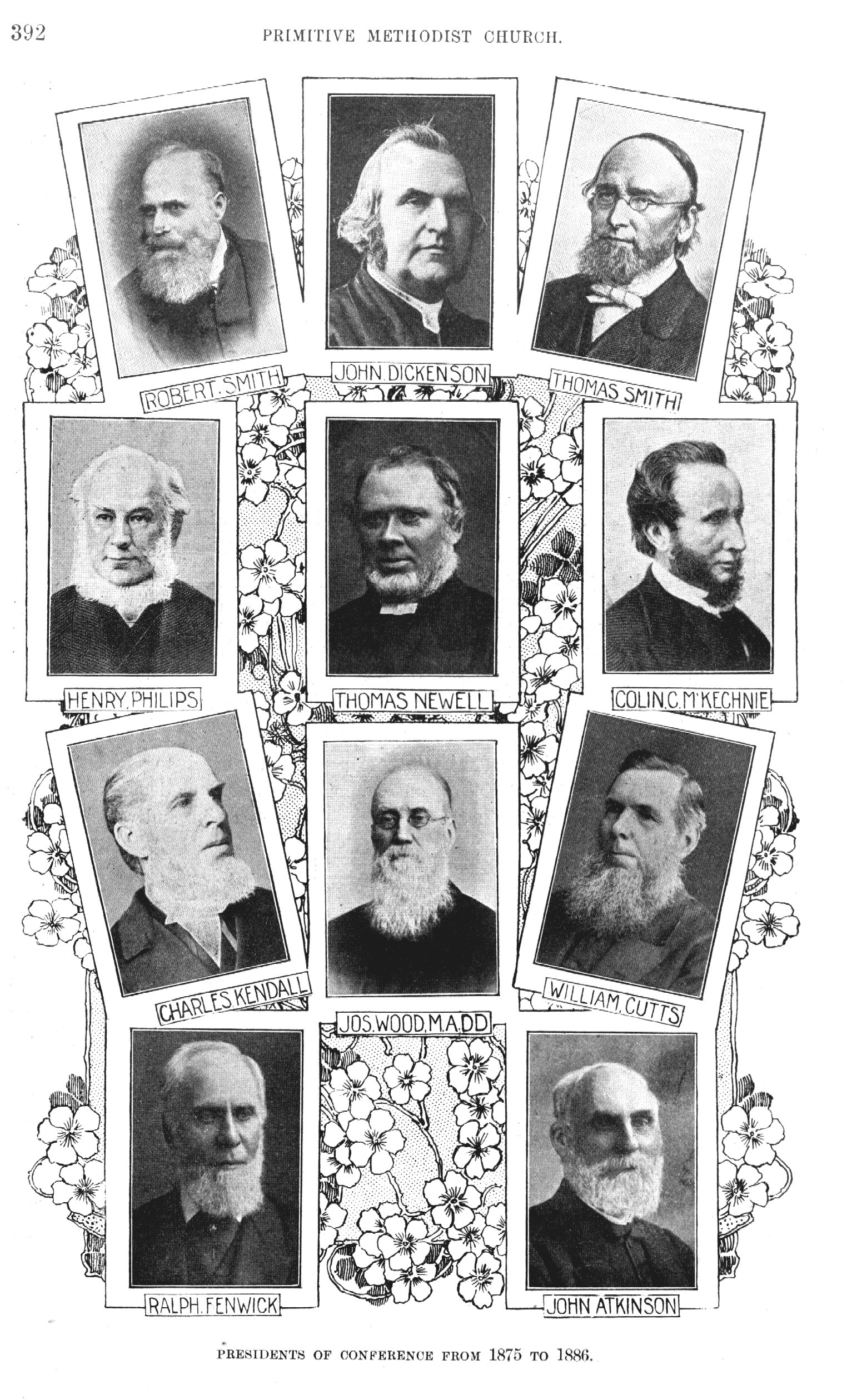
PM Presidents including Charles Kendall (1881)

=== The Kendall family ===
Thomas and Fanny Kendall raised ten sons and one daughter to adulthood, six of the sons became Ministers in the Primitive Methodist Church; though not all remained as PMs. There are ten Kendalls listed in Leary, H. B. Kendall's father Charles (1818–1882), and five of his uncles (Thomas (1816–1878), Dennis (1824–1896), Joseph (1827–1890)) joined the United Methodists. Amos (1830–1909) immigrated to America and joined the Methodist Episcopal Church South, Henry (1832–1900) joined the Congregationalist Methodists and H. B. Kendall's cousin Frederick Dennis (born 1858). Cousins, Henry George and his brother James Dennis Hird (later first Principal of Ruskin College) were ordained in the Church of England.

In recognition of the Kendall contribution to Primitive Methodism the Kendall Memorial Chapel was opened in 1885 in the hamlet of Ashby, Lincolnshire (now part of Scunthorpe) the home of the Kendall family since the 1820s.

Kendall's family provided a remarkable number of clergy, not only among the Primitive Methodists but also in the Church of England.

=== Circuits ===
Kendall served in the following Circuits -
1864 – Newcastle
1867 – North Shields
1871 – Sunderland
1874 – Durham
1877 – Spennymoor
1879 – Middlesbrough
1884 – Harrogate
1892 – Editor (Primitive Methodist publishing),
1901 – Folkestone, and President of the Conference
1902 – Bournemouth (Retired)

Kendall's own work describes the Primitive Methodist Bookroom in some detail. The minimal reference in Leary, "Editor", covers a decade of work which made Kendall one of the most influential persons of his time in Primitive Methodism.

== Kendall the historian ==
Kendall's lasting claim to fame is the three separate histories of the Primitive Methodist Church. The second of these was commissioned for publication in 1907, the centenary of the first Primitive Methodist Camp Meeting, 31 May 1807. He is therefore regarded amongst British Methodists as one of the essential sources of information on this subject.

=== History of the Primitive Methodist Connexion, 1888 ===
H B Kendall's first significant history was published in 1888 (this date is inferred from material in the book). This shows a combination of literary style and scholarship which made Kendall a candidate for writing the most substantial of all the histories for the Camp Meeting Centenary. Kendall's skills would have been enhanced by his time as Connexional Editor, and retirement would have freed him to do the work. This the shortest work (120 pages of text, equivalent to A5 size)

=== The Origin and History of the Primitive Methodist Church, 1906 ===
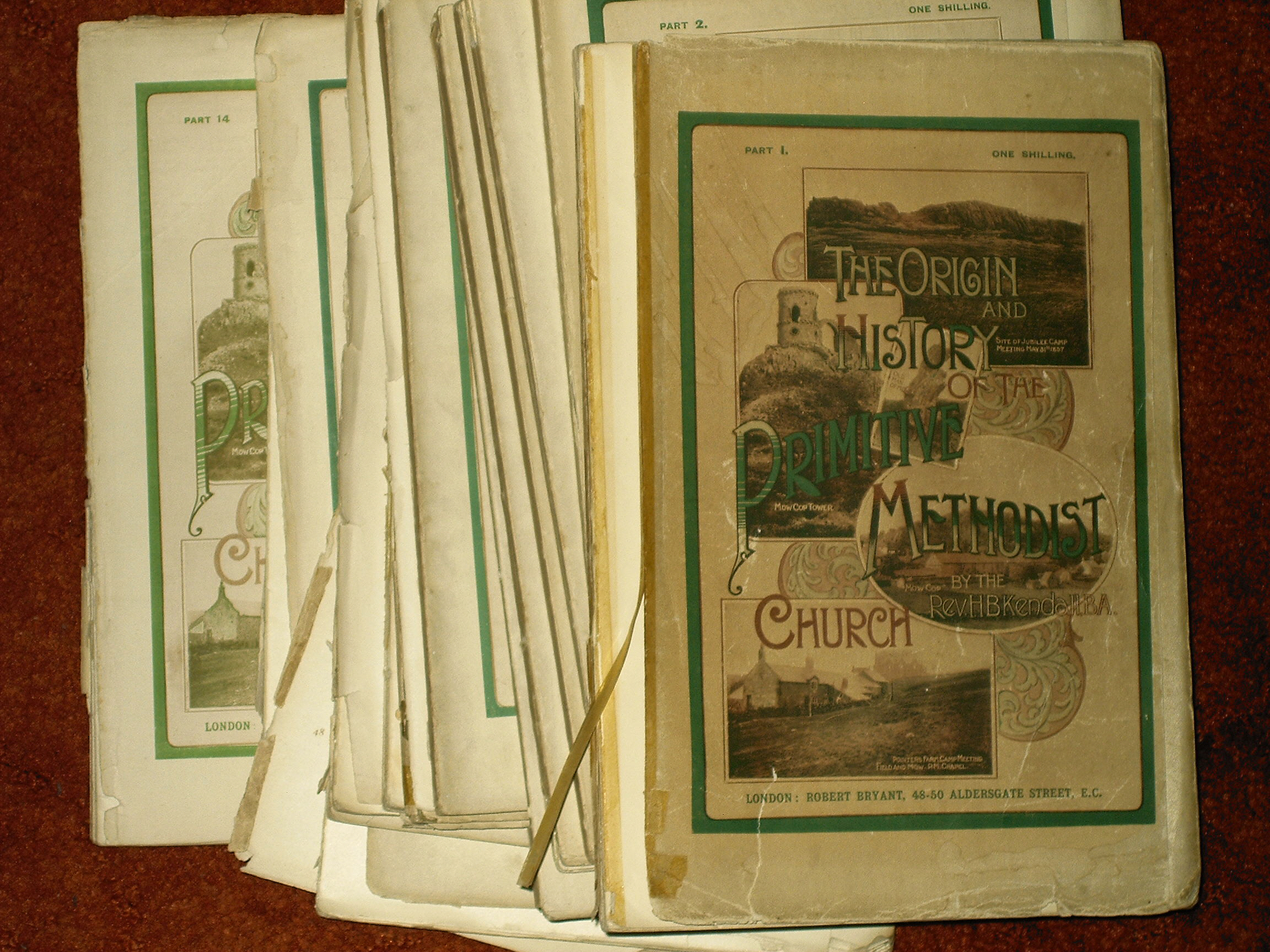
First printing was published in 14 fascicules

H B Kendall was honoured with being asked to write the major publication celebrating the Camp Meeting Centenary. This detailed work is generally regarded as the definitive history of Primitive Methodism. It was first published as a set of 14 fascicules of 80 pages each in paper covers, often breaking in mid-sentence between volumes. There are a few misprints, for example the dates of the first two Ramsor Camp Meetings being given as 1809 when they were actually 1808. The main printing was in 2 hardback volumes (1906). This has since been reprinted by Tentmaker Publications. ISBN 1-901670-49-X ISBN 9781901670-49-3 (EAN-13 format)

=== History of the Primitive Methodist Church, 1919 ===
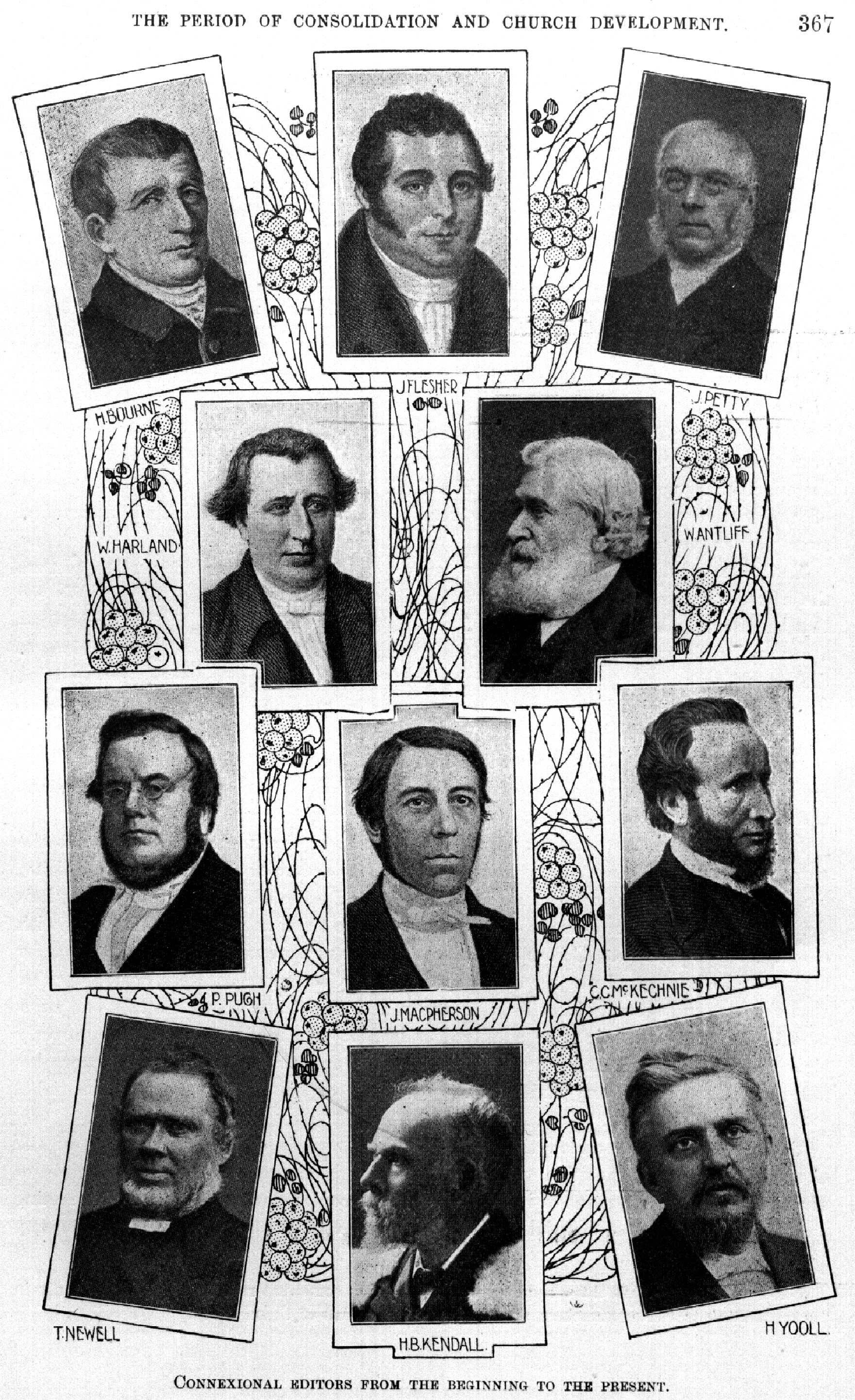
General Editors of the Primitive Methodist Bookroom

A third history was written during World War I, and has his final words "penned when the Great War is over." This is a shorter work (174 pages of text plus a few tables, equivalent to A5 size).

The advantages of this volume are that it provides a more condensed summary of the history, and it contains information up to 1918. For example, the sub-headings in chapters II and III allow the reader easily to date the key events leading up to the adoption of the name Primitive Methodist on 13 February 1812. In this volume, we also find the considered judgement of a mature scholar upon the events of history and the people involved.

=== Other works ===
Kendall wrote other books, as well as his necessary editorial contributions to The Primitive Methodist Magazine. One example that has been copied and made available on the internet is Christ's Kingdom and Church in the Nineteenth Century. (See external links below.) This is the text of the fifth Hartley Lecture for June 1901, the start of H. B. Kendall's year as President of the Primitive Methodist Conference. (Hartley was famous for making jam and related products, and he was an important benefactor of the Primitive Methodist ministerial training college in Manchester. This later had a change of name to commemorate Hartley's support of the college.)

== Death ==
He died on 10 March 1919 in Bournemouth, Hampshire, England. He was buried in Boscombe Cemetery.

== Notes ==
1. There is a variation in the spelling of Bickerstaffe. The spelling in Leary is without the final letter e. But the spelling with the final e is the normal spelling in Kendall family documents. The variations may be within that which was normal in the 19th century. The spelling and name used in some Methodist documents was H. Bickerstaffe Kendall, he is often referred to as H B Kendall without his Christian names; for example, the captions used in the montages of photographs in this article.
2. This volume has been copied to the internet and is freely available for non-commercial use. See External links below
3. Available through the Englesea Brook Chapel and Museum of Primitive Methodism, or directly from Tentmaker Publications. See External links below
