= Mow Cop =

Village in Cheshire and Staffordshire, England

Coordinates: 53.112973°N 2.217582°W

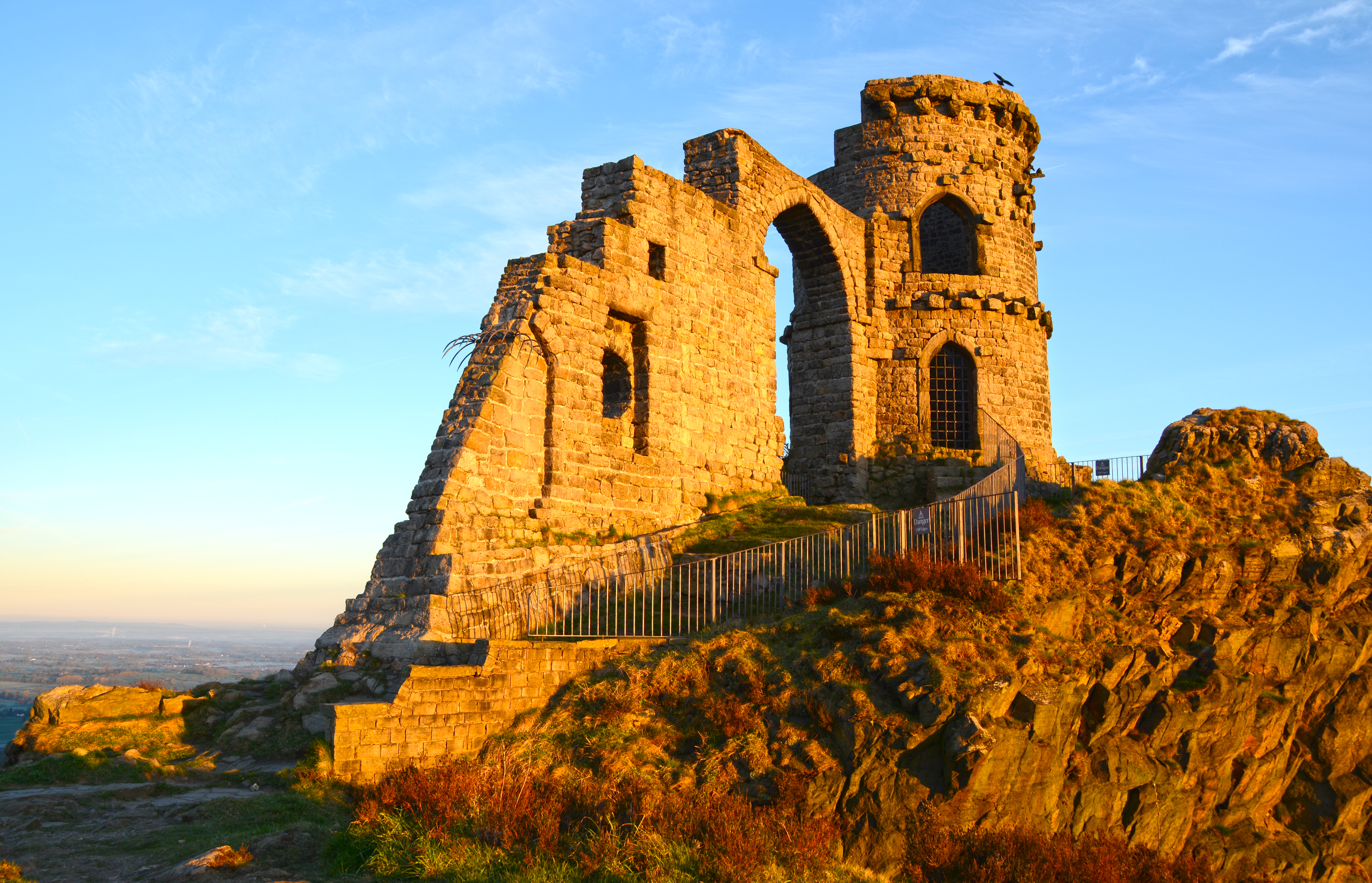
- Mow Cop Castle

- Location within Staffordshire Location within Cheshire
- OS grid reference: SJ855573
- Civil parish: Odd Rode; Kidsgrove
- District: Newcastle-under-Lyme
- Unitary authority: Cheshire East
- Shire county: Staffordshire
- Ceremonial county: Cheshire
- Region: North West; West Midlands
- Country: England
- Sovereign state: United Kingdom
- Post town: STOKE-ON-TRENT
- Postcode district: ST7
- Dialling code: 01782
- Police: Cheshire
- Staffordshire
- Fire: Cheshire
- Staffordshire
- Ambulance: North West
- West Midlands
- UK Parliament: Congleton; Staffordshire Moorlands

Mow Cop /ˈmaʊˈkɒp/ is a village on the Cheshire-Staffordshire border, England, 24 miles (39 km) south of Manchester and 6 miles (9.7 km) north of Stoke-on-Trent, on a steep hill of the same name rising to 335 metres (1,099 ft) above sea level. The village is at the edge of the southern Pennines, with the Cheshire Plain to the west.

== Geography ==
The 335-metre (1,099 ft) hill on which the village lies is a moorland ridge composed of sandstone and Millstone Grit rising eastwards above the Cheshire Plain. It is at the western edge of the Staffordshire Moorlands, forming the upland fringe of the southern Pennines, most of which are in the Peak District National Park to the east. On a clear day, the hill offers views extending to the West Pennine Moors, Welsh mountains (including Snowdonia), Manchester, Shropshire Hills and Cannock Chase. The Cheshire section is the highest settlement in the county.

== History ==
The name is first recorded as Mowel around 1270 AD, and is believed to derive from either the Anglo-Saxon Mūga-hyll, meaning "heap-hill", with copp = "head" added later, or the Common Celtic ancestor of Welsh moel (= hill), with Anglo-Saxon copp added later.

At the village's summit, men once quarried stone to make into querns, used since the Iron Age for milling grain; this trade ended during the Victorian period. The village also has a long history of coal mining. A 65-foot (20 m) rock feature called the Old Man O'Mow in one of the quarried areas is believed to be the site of an ancient cairn.

A railway station, opened by the North Staffordshire Railway, served the village from 9 October 1848 to its closure in 1964.

== The Castle ==
The most dominant feature of the village is Mow Cop Castle, a folly of a ruined castle at the summit of the hill, built in 1754. Both Mow Cop Castle and the Old Man O'Mow are under the management of the National Trust and on the route of the Cheshire Gritstone Trail, a long-distance walking route.

== Birthplace of Primitive Methodism ==
Mow Cop is noteworthy as the birthplace of the Primitive Methodist movement. Starting in 1800, Hugh Bourne from Stoke-on-Trent and William Clowes from Burslem began holding open-air prayer meetings. On 31 May 1807, a large 14-hour camp meeting was held, leading to the founding of the Primitive Methodist Church in 1810. These camp meetings became a regular feature at Mow Cop, being held to celebrate the 100th, 150th, and 200th anniversaries of the first camp.

== In the arts ==
The village and castle are featured prominently in the 1973 novel Red Shift, by Alan Garner. The BBC filmed this novel in the 1970s and later released it on a restored HD DVD in 2014. Mow Cop and its castle also feature in Alan Garner's 1966 photo-story book for children, The Old Man of Mow.

The castle has attracted artists and has been featured in paintings, postcards, and ceramics made in the nearby Potteries. An engraving of it also featured on a Royal Mail stamp book in 1981.

== Running and cycling ==
Since the late 20th century, Mow Cop has been known for its Killer Mile, a one-mile running race from the railway level crossing on the western side of the hill up to the castle. The race was first organized in the early 1980s by John Britton. The climb is also well known among local cyclists and features in the 100 Greatest Cycling Climbs in Britain.

== Murder of Steven Johnson ==
On 22 December 1990, the body of Stoke-on-Trent taxi driver Steven Johnson, a 25-year-old married father of two children, was discovered by a dog-walker on a farm track near Castle Road in Mow Cop. His body was found close to his taxi. Johnson had last been seen picking up a fare in Hanley Road, Hanley, to be dropped off in Packmoor at around 03:30 on 22 December. He then drove from Packmoor to Mow Cop. Johnson had been assaulted inside his taxi, and his throat was cut, causing his death. It was reported by Staffordshire Police that cash and valuables were not taken from the taxi, and the motive for the murder was unknown. The crime was featured in the March 1991 edition of BBC Crimewatch and a reconstruction was filmed. One male suspect was arrested in 2014 and released on bail for five months, but no further action followed. The murder remains unsolved as of November 2020.

== Notable residents ==
- Ralph Barlow (1876 in Mow Cop – 1897), footballer who played for Burslem Port Vale in the mid-1890s.
- Emmanuel Foster (1921–1965), English footballer, played for Mow Cop, Stoke City F.C. and Stafford Rangers F.C.
- Jack Simcock (1929–2012), artist, known for "a long series of bleak, sombre oils on board" of the Mow Cop area where he lived.
- Allen John Tankard (born 1969), English former footballer who played 519 league games, 275 for Port Vale. After retiring, he worked in Mow Cop at a minibus and coach hire company, which he now co-owns.
