= Hugh Bourne =

Hugh Bourne (3 April 1772 – 11 October 1852) along with William Clowes was the joint founder of Primitive Methodism, the largest offshoot of Wesleyan Methodism and, in the mid-19th century, an influential Protestant Christian movement in its own right.

== Early life ==
Hugh Bourne was born on 3 April 1772 at Ford Hayes Farm, Ford Hayes Lane, Bucknall, within the present-day boundaries of Stoke-on-Trent, Staffordshire.

Hugh was the son of Joseph and Ellen Bourne. In 1788, after basic training as a carpenter, Hugh moved to the nearby mining village of Bemersley (in the north-eastern fringe of the present-day Stoke-on-Trent) and was apprenticed to his uncle as a wheelwright. After 'serving his time' learning the trade, Bourne specialised principally in making and repairing windmill and watermill wheels.

Bourne was brought up in a religious family and from the age of seven was increasingly troubled by existential and religious questions. He lived with a rather morbid fear of being condemned to Hell and spent, as he phrased it, "twenty sorrowful years" in pursuit of salvation. Naturally, the shy young Bourne read the Bible, but it was only when his mother brought him an anthology of Christian writings in 1799 that the Christian message of salvation really began to resonate. Bourne wrote, "I believed in my heart, grace descended and Jesus Christ manifested himself unto me, my sins were taken away in an instant, and I was filled with all joy and peace in believing."

Bourne's conversion at the age of 27 led him to join the local Wesleyan society at Burslem, one of the historical six towns of the City of Stoke-on-Trent. He continued as a wheelwright but, after a period of group bible study, soon became a Methodist lay-preacher.

By 1800, Bourne had moved a short distance to Harriseahead, a mining village near Biddulph close to the Staffordshire–Cheshire border. Bourne was appalled at the moral state of his new surroundings, saying, "There was not in England a neighbourhood that was more ungodly and profane. A stranger could hardly go over Harriseahead without insult and sometimes not without injury."

Bourne was "constitutionally shy, somewhat dour, yet – strange union of opposites – courageous and doggedly persistent". He soon earned a reputation as a zealous preacher but the Wesleyan leadership were uncomfortable with his radicalism. Initially, he conducted a recognisably Wesleyan form of service but, later, he rejected this as being boring and out of date; in short, the traditional service was 'not fit for purpose'. To engage with people, Bourne developed a style of open-air preaching, combined with public confession of sin, group prayer, and hymn singing. This was clearly distinctive from the Wesleyan norm and provided the template for the later Camp Meetings. A chapel was established at Harriseahead and, by 1804, the religious 'revival' Bourne began in his new village had spread to the northern Potteries towns of Burslem and Tunstall and into south Cheshire. One notable achievement of this revival was the religious conversion of Burslem-born William Clowes (1780–1851), the other joint founder of Primitive Methodism.

Often overlooked is the change following what may be called "Hugh Bourne's Pentecost". In 1804, some "revivalists" from Stockport led the Michaelmas Love Feast at Congleton where they spoke of John Wesley's teaching of "entire sanctification". Jesse Ashworth, who knew some of these revivalists, records the change in Hugh Bourne and his companions. Their preaching, and the Church, found a new freedom and blessing from God. They held a Christmas Love Feast at Harriseahead, with many standing on or between the pews for lack of space. This began the time of revival when some key Primitive Methodist leaders, most importantly William Clowes, were converted.

== Camp meetings, Bourne's expulsion and the origins of Primitive Methodism ==
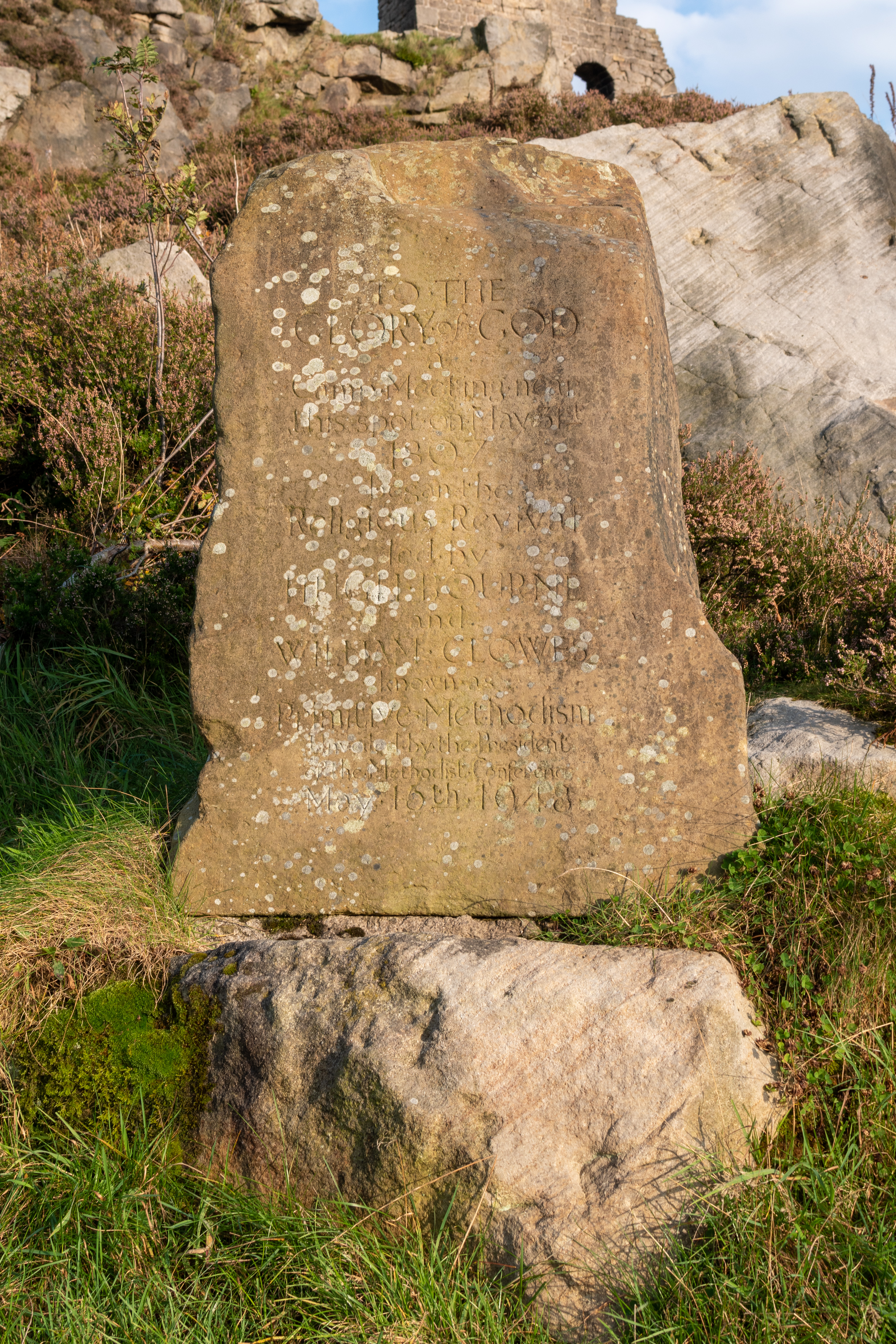
Stone at Mow Cop Castle commemorating the foundation of Primitive Methodism

Bourne and Clowes' Primitive Methodism germinated in the Camp Meetings from 1807 onwards and its separate organisational form came about as a direct result of the Wesleyan circuit authorities' reaction to these Meetings. Camp Meetings were all day, open-air gatherings for Christian preaching and group prayer, usually followed by a Love Feast. They were based on evangelical revival meetings in America. The first such meeting in England was held on Sunday 31 May 1807, between 6 a.m. to 8 p.m., in a field at School Farm, Mow Cop, about a quarter of a mile south west of Mow Cop Folly (a mock castle ruins built in 1754). Mow Cop, on the Staffordshire–Cheshire border, was a bleak spot lying as it does on a limestone ridge rising to 1,091 feet above sea level. Nevertheless, during the afternoon, the Camp still managed to draw a crowd of up to 4,000 people.

Although Mow Cop was supposed to be a one-off, the number of conversions confirmed Bourne in his belief in the relevance and effectiveness of Camp Meetings and others soon followed. There was a second Mow Camp Meeting (19 July) and a third at Norton-in-the-Moors (now a north-eastern neighbourhood in Stoke-on-Trent) on 23 August 1807. Others included Ramsor (Staffordshire) (two miles north of Alton Towers).

"Men naturally turn to Mow Cop rather than to Norton, for there is more to engage and impress the imagination in the former; but to those who judge of events by their significance and results, Norton overtops Mow. It is not always the first step that is the most difficult: sometimes it is harder to go on than to begin... [The Norton Camp Meeting] is, historically, the most important; for, before it was held, the Liverpool Conference of 1807 had given its judgement, and the judgement was adverse. Naturally, the ministers of the Burslem Circuit, the storm-centre of the movement, lost no time on their return in endeavouring to preserve their societies from complicity with what the Conference had pronounced to be 'highly improper and likely to be of considerable mischief'".

After the Wesleyan authorities' reaction to the first three Camp Meetings, it was no surprise that, ten months after the Norton-in-the-Moors Camp, Bourne was expelled from the Wesleyan Methodists by the Burslem Quarterly Meeting. The reason given was non-attendance at Bible class but the real reason was explained by the Wesleyan superintendent who told Bourne that it was "because you have a tendency to set up other than the ordinary worship". (Ironically, this was the reason the Anglican Church of England gave for refusing to endorse John Wesley's mission in the mid-18th century.)

Unlike Rev. Joseph Cooke of east Lancashire, who had been expelled by the Conference of 1806, Bourne and his supporters had no doctrinal dispute with the Wesleyans. Thus, for the next couple of years, the societies sympathetic to Bourne (known as 'Camp Meeting Methodists') continued to remain part of the parent body but things changed in 1811. After the Ramsor Camp on 3 June 1810 when Mary Dunnell was one of the speakers, William Clowes was excluded from the Wesleyan Methodists and, in 1811, Bourne and his brother founded the first Chapel since his expulsion in Tunstall, Stoke-on-Trent. Bourne visited Derbyshire where Mary Dunnell was making good progress around Darley Moor, Osmanton, and Rodsley. Dunnell told him that she had a vision that William Allcock and William Clowes had lost their faith and Boutnes set off to see them. It is speculated that Dunnell invented the vision to leave herself in charge if what became known as "Mrs Dunnell's people". The Derbyshire followers were annoyed when Bourne revealed that Dunnell was a bigamist and she left, afterwards Bourne had to avoid the area.

Clowes, and his followers ('Clowesites'), issued an invitation to Bourne, and his supporters, to form a new organisation. In February 1812 the new body adopted the name 'Society of the Primitive Methodists', which is believed to refer to John Wesley's assertion that the early Methodists manifested the "Primitive" Christianity of the 1st century. The fledgling movement spread rapidly, first along the valley of the Trent. In 1819 the inaugural Primitive Methodist Conference was held at Nottingham (the site of a large Camp Meeting on Whit Sunday 1816 which had been attended by 12,000) and the second at Hull in 1820.

== Bourne's organisational ability and the growth of Primitive Methodism ==
Missions, often accompanied by Camp Meetings, were disproportionately successful in working-class mining and agricultural communities. Each circuit planned and carried out its own missionary work separately until 1825, when the Conference appointed the General Missionary Committee to centralise guidance. By 1842 membership had increased to almost 80,000 with 500 travelling preachers and more than 1,200 chapels.

Beginning in 1803, Bourne kept a personal journal. Themes found in the extant volumes of his journal include preaching activities, remarks in support of teetotalism, Sunday schools, and Methodist politics.

Bourne travelled and preached widely in England, Scotland, Ireland, Canada and the USA until his death in 1852. He was a man of exceptional energy and organisational abilities. Bourne also wrote the History of the Primitive Methodists (1823), a variety of theological tracts on subjects from baptism to salvation, edited the Primitive Methodist hymn book, and was editor of the denominational magazine for two decades.

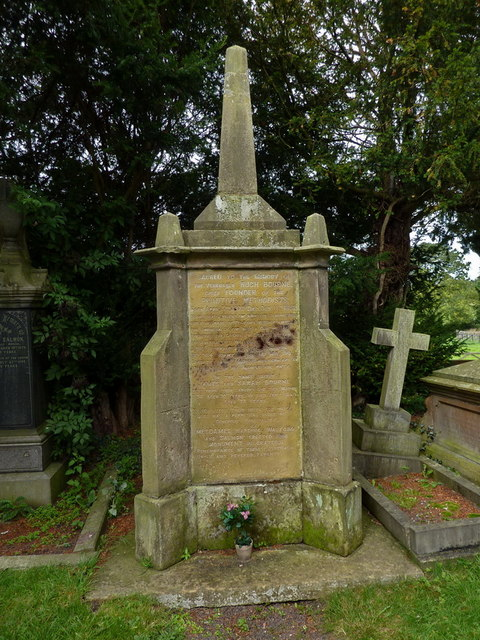
Memorial to Hugh Bourne at Englesea Brook

Whilst there were no essential doctrinal differences with the Wesleyans, Primitive Methodism was shaped by the experience of vilification shared by Bourne, Clowes, and others. Thus, whereas the Wesleyans concentrated a great deal of authority in the hands of their Ministers, the Primitive Methodists chose instead to trust the role of lay people.

Another difference of emphasis between Hugh Bourne and some of the Wesleyans of his time was his desire to follow closely the teaching of John Wesley in the mid-18th century. Weary with persecution, many Wesleyans, though true to the same doctrines, had toned down their preaching in an effort to court respectability. This was one of the factors behind the 1807 Methodist Conference's condemnation of Camp Meetings. The Minutes (widely quoted in Holliday Bickerstaffe Kendall and most histories of Primitive Methodism) say, "It is our judgment, that even supposing such meetings to be allowable in America, they are highly improper in England, and likely to be productive of considerable mischief; and we disclaim all connection with them."

Primitive Methodism was also shaped by Bourne's joint concern for the spiritual salvation and social welfare of ordinary working people. For example, just like Keir Hardie in the early 20th century, Bourne understood that drunkenness was a major factor which kept working-class people down in base conditions. Also, In the face of establishment opposition, Bourne promoted working class education, including instruction in reading, writing and arithmetic, in addition to religious teaching, at the Primitive Methodist Sunday Schools. Many early trade union pioneers were drawn from the ranks of Primitive Methodist Preachers, and a basic 'welfare state' used to operate among chapel-goers, their neighbours and families. In common with some other non-conformists, Bourne accepted women as of equal status with men by (amongst other things) appointing women Preachers.

By the time of his death (11 October 1852), Bourne was regarded as a father figure for the movement and his funeral procession was attended by more than 16,000 people. He is buried at Englesea Brook chapel in Weston, near Crewe, south Cheshire, not far from his home in Bemersley, near Tunstall, Stoke-on-Trent, north Staffordshire. His gravestone records that there were 9,916 itinerant and local preachers, 109,964 inscribed Primitive Methodist members, and 148,8896 Sabbath schoolteachers and scholars at the time of his death. By 1860 the international movement he helped to found and organise had 650 Ministers, 11,304 local preachers and over 100,000 members. It had extended beyond the British Isles, Canada and the USA to Australia, New Zealand, Nigeria and South Africa.
