= Primitive Methodist Church =

Methodist Christian denomination

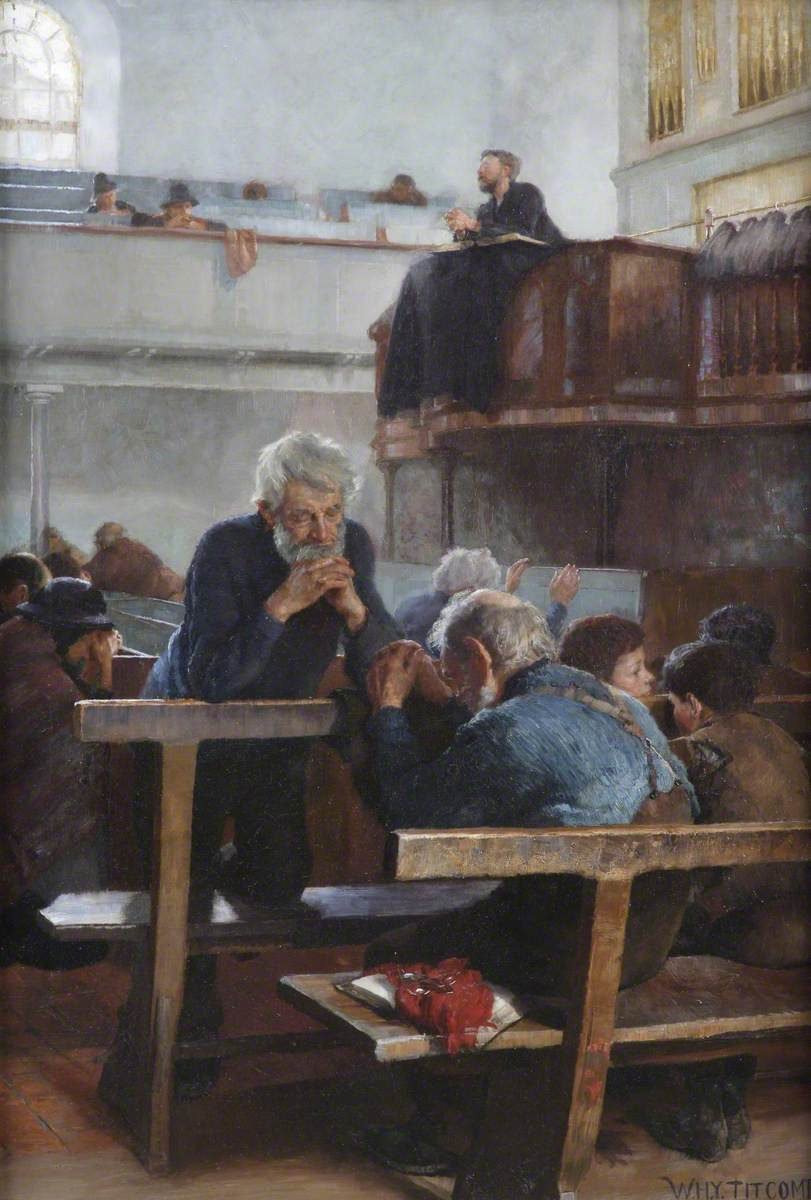
- Primitive Methodists at Prayer, 1889, by William Holt Yates Titcomb
- Classification: Protestant
- Orientation: Methodist
- Associations: World Federation of Primitive Methodists
- Region: United States, Canada, Spain, and Guatemala; with missions elsewhere around the world
- Founder: Hugh Bourne and William Clowes
- Origin: 1807
- Congregations: Worldwide 191, USA 63
- Members: Approx. 17,300 (worldwide)
- Official website: USA: primitivemethodistchurch.org

The Primitive Methodist Church is a Methodist Christian denomination. It originated in early 19th-century England as a revivalist movement within Wesleyan Methodism, having been influenced in part by American evangelist Lorenzo Dow (1777–1834), whose visits inspired a return to fervent, open-air preaching.

In the United States, the Primitive Methodist Church in 2026 has over 60 congregations across 13 eastern states.

In Great Britain and Australia, the Primitive Methodist Church merged with other denominations, in the UK to form the Methodist Church of Great Britain in 1932, and in Australia to form the Methodist Church of Australasia in 1902. The latter subsequently merged into the Uniting Church in Australia in 1977.

== History ==
=== United Kingdom ===
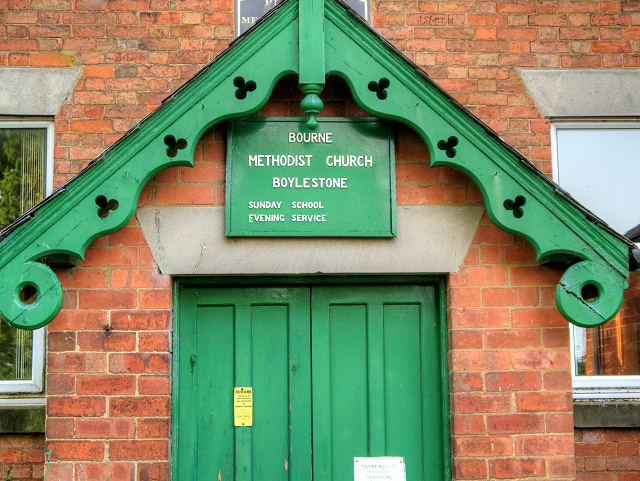
Bourne Methodist Church in Boylestone, Derbyshire. The former Primitive chapel was opened in January 1847 by Hugh Bourne.

The leaders who originated Primitive Methodism were attempting to restore a spirit of revivalism as they felt was found in the ministry of John Wesley, with no intent of forming a new church. The leaders were Hugh Bourne (1772–1852) and William Clowes (1780–1851), licensed lay preachers in the Wesleyan Methodist Church. Bourne had joined a Methodist society at Burslem, but business taking him at the close of 1800 to the colliery district of Harriseahead and Kidsgrove, he was so impressed by the prevailing ignorance that he began a religious revival of the district, and Clowes joined him in 1805.

The two preachers heard from Lorenzo Dow of the results of American camp meetings, and held a fourteen-hour camp meeting on 31 May 1807, at Mow Cop on the Staffordshire and Cheshire border, which resulted in many converts. But the Wesleyan Church refused to admit these converts to the church, and reprimanded Bourne and Clowes. Refusing to cease holding open-air meetings, they were dismissed from the church. For a while they took separate paths, but after waiting two years for readmittance to the church, they joined together again in 1810. Clowes's personality drew a number of men after him, and a society meeting held in a kitchen and then in a warehouse became the nucleus of a circuit, a chapel being built at Tunstall in July 1811, and there in February 1812 they took the name The Society of the Primitive Methodists.

Notably, since Bourne and Clowes had both already had their memberships revoked from the Wesleyan Church (Bourne in 1808 and Clowes in 1810), and since, prior to their removal, they had not had any intention of starting a distinct denomination, the Society of Primitive Methodists was, consequently, not a schism from a parent body (Ritson 1909:94). The chosen name for this non-schismatic entity was intended to indicate that they were conducting themselves like the ancient Church of the early centuries, and in the way of John Wesley and the original Methodists, particularly in reference to open-air meetings, with an emphasis on personal conversion and holiness of life.

Primitive Methodist workers played an important role in the formative phase of the trade union movement in England. Primitives were always the most working class of the main Methodist bodies in Great Britain. In recent scholarship (Calder 2012:274), it has been shown that the British PMs were not as heavily dominated by the working class as had been previously thought.

Early on in the new movement there was a fascinating tradition of roving women lay preachers - the last of the women roving preachers died in 1890.

The British Primitive Methodist Conference in the UK initiated talks in 1894 with the Bible Christian Church, a small South West-based Methodist denomination, to explore the possibility of union; however, the proposals were ultimately rejected at the Quarterly Meetings (Circuit meetings). In 1932 it united with the Wesleyan Methodist Church and the United Methodists to form the Methodist Church of Great Britain. The legacy of Hugh Bourne is kept alive at Englesea Brook, the museum of Primitive Methodism.

=== United States ===
The first missionaries to America arrived in Brooklyn, New York, in 1829. The societies founded in the United States were under the control of the British Primitive Methodist Conference until 1840, when the Connexion's Conference in the USA decided to become independent of the British Conference. The "American Primitive Methodist Church" was established on 16 September 1840. A combining of various PMC organizational structures occurred in May 1975, and the current (2004) official name - The Primitive Methodist Church in the United States of America - was chosen.

Since their independence from the British PM Conference in 1840, the denomination has not merged with any other non-PM denominations. This makes the PMC in the USA one of the oldest ongoing Methodist denominations in America.

The PMC holds a conference once every two years. A president, elected every four years, is the chief leader of the denomination and their headquarters are located in his home.

=== Australia ===
Primitive Methodist congregations were also established in Australia. In 1902 the Primitive Methodist Church, Wesleyan Methodist Church, Bible Christians and the United Methodist Free Churches formed the Methodist Church of Australasia. In 1977 the Methodist Church of Australasia joined with the Congregational Union of Australia and Presbyterian Church of Australia to form the Uniting Church in Australia.

== Beliefs ==
The Primitive Methodist Church affirms the inerrancy and infallibility of the Bible; is Trinitarian; believes that Christ Jesus is fully God and fully man in one person; holds that Adam and Eve were created directly by God, that they both subsequently fell into sin, and that their natures were consequently corrupted, which corruption has been inherited by the rest of humanity; confesses that God the Father sent His only-begotten Son into the world, the Lord Jesus Christ, who was born of a virgin by the Holy Spirit, who lived a perfect life, died an atoning death for the sins of the whole world, and rose bodily from the tomb, victorious over sin, death, and the Devil. The PMC believes that Christ then ascended into Heaven, and will return in glory to raise the dead, and to judge everyone who has ever lived.

The PMC teaches that, in order for those who have reached an age of accountability to receive God's free gift of the forgiveness of sins, and the gift of eternal life in Christ, there needs to be a personal response of sincere repentance of sin, and faith in Jesus as Saviour and Lord. This response to the gospel is enabled by God's grace. Christians must then, by God's grace, abide in Christ by faith. This persevering faith should be discernable over time by a transformation in Christlike character traits (growth in holiness) - even if this growth is often slow, and perhaps sometimes altogether interrupted through significant, persistent disobedience, before being renewed again in repentance and trust towards God.

The denomination holds that the destinies of both the saved and the finally impenitent will be everlasting, conscious states.

The PMC recognizes the dominical sacraments of Baptism (including for the children of believers) and Communion.

== Missions ==
The Primitive Methodist Church in the United States has missions in Spain, Guatemala and other countries throughout the world. Its mission work in Africa dates back to 1897 and its mission work in Guatemala was started in 1921.

== Ecumenical relations ==
The Primitive Methodist Church in the United States is a member of the National Association of Evangelicals.

== See also ==
- Bible Methodist Connection of Churches
- Evangelical Methodist Church of America
- Fundamental Methodist Conference, Inc.
- Free Methodist Church
- Southern Methodist Church
