= William Clowes (Primitive Methodist) =

Founder of the Primitive Methodist Church

William Clowes (1780–1851) was one of the founders of Primitive Methodism.

== Biography ==
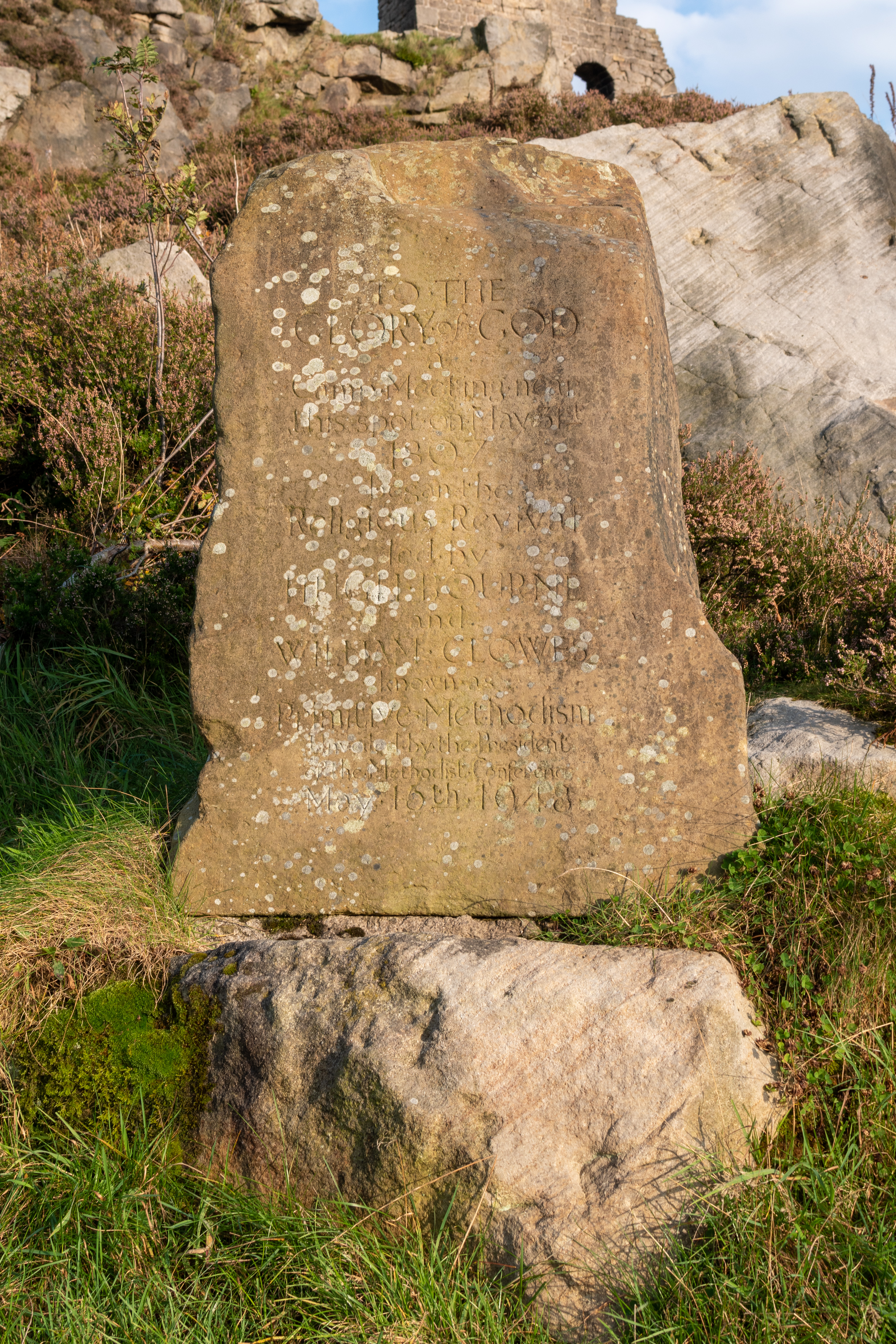
Stone at Mow Cop Castle commemorating the foundation of Primitive Methodism

William Clowes was born at Burslem, Staffordshire, on 12 March 1780. During the early 1800s, he started his preaching career. During 1810, the Primitive Methodist Connexion was co-created by him. Clowes introduced this to Hull nine years later. He was assisted by Sarah and John Kirkland, who were both experienced preachers, until John's health gave way and Sarah was pregnant. They returned to Derbyshire in May 1820.

In 1821 his evangelizing in Leeds was so successful that Ann Carr, Sarah Ecland and Martha Williams were sent from Hull to join him. These new arrivals caused some problems as they were both popular and undisciplined moving from circuit to circuit as the will took them.

== Death and legacy ==
On 10 June 1842 he was placed on the superannuation fund. His journal and his life story was published in 1844. He still continued his labours until a day or two before he died from paralysis, at Hull on 2 March 1851.

One of his daughters married her cousin, John Wedgwood, an Anglican priest.
