= Biographical Sketches of the Lives and Public Ministry of Various Holy Women =

Memoirs of a female

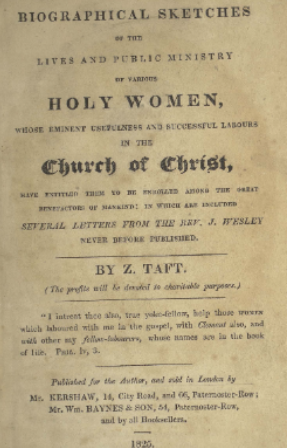
- Author: Zechariah Taft
- Publication date: 1825-1828

Biographical Sketches of the Lives and Public Ministry of Various Holy Women was written by Zechariah Taft and published in 1825–1828 in two volumes. The work was not supported by the Methodists and its publication costs were raised privately. The books full title was Biographical sketches of the lives and public ministry of various holy women: whose eminent usefulness and successful labours in the church of Christ have entitled them to be enrolled among the great benefactors of mankind: in which are included several letters from the Rev. J. Wesley never before published" Any proceeds from the publication were to be donated to charity.

== Background ==
Taft was a supporter of women preachers. He married Mary Barritt who is one of the women mentioned (as Miss Barritt) in his introduction. Moreover, his wife is included in a frontispiece and named Mary Taft. Taft says that his aim is to record these women's contributions as he sees them as martyrs to changing ideas. In 1803 the annual Methodist Conference in Manchester had ruled that:

The text said "[women should not preach]... 1. Because a vast majority of our people are opposed to it. 2. Because their preaching does not at all seem necessary, there being a sufficiency of preachers, whom God has accredited, to supply all the places in our connection with regular preaching. But if any woman among us think she has an extraordinary call from God to speak in public, (and we are sure it must be an extraordinary call that can authorize it,) we are of the opinion she should in general, address her own sex and those only: And upon this condition alone..."

The instruction was said to result from the work that his wife was doing. His wife, with the support of other preachers, ignored the instruction. She was occupied being a preacher on the same circuit as her husband in Epworth. Mary and Zechariah have been described as the powerhouse behind women preaching. Their contacts included Eliza Wilson in Yorkshire, Mary Holder and in Madeley Mary Fletcher and Mary Tooth.

== Content ==
The introduction explains the motives for the books production.

The biographies include those of Susanna Wesley, Mary Fletcher and Sarah Lawrance, Ann Gilbert (died 1795), Bathsheba Hall, Grace Reed, Sarah Grubb, Mrs Jewitt, Sarah Cox and dozens of others.
