= Woodhouse Cemetery =

Cemetery in West Yorkshire, England

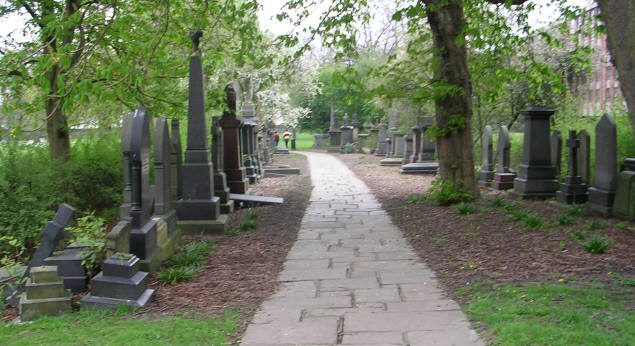
- Woodhouse Cemetery
- Interactive map of Woodhouse Cemetery

Details
- Established: 1835
- Closed: 1969
- Location: Woodhouse, Leeds, West Yorkshire
- Country: England
- Coordinates: 53°48′31″N 01°33′24″W
- Type: Public, Anglican, War graves, memorial
- Owned by: Leeds University
- No. of interments: 93,569
- Find a Grave: Woodhouse Cemetery

The Leeds General Cemetery (also known as Woodhouse Cemetery, Woodhouse Lane Cemetery and, since its closure in 1969, St George's Fields) is a former cemetery in Woodhouse, Leeds, West Yorkshire, England. It is now within the campus of the University of Leeds and has been landscaped and kept as an open space. Some original monuments and the cemetery chapel remain.

== History ==
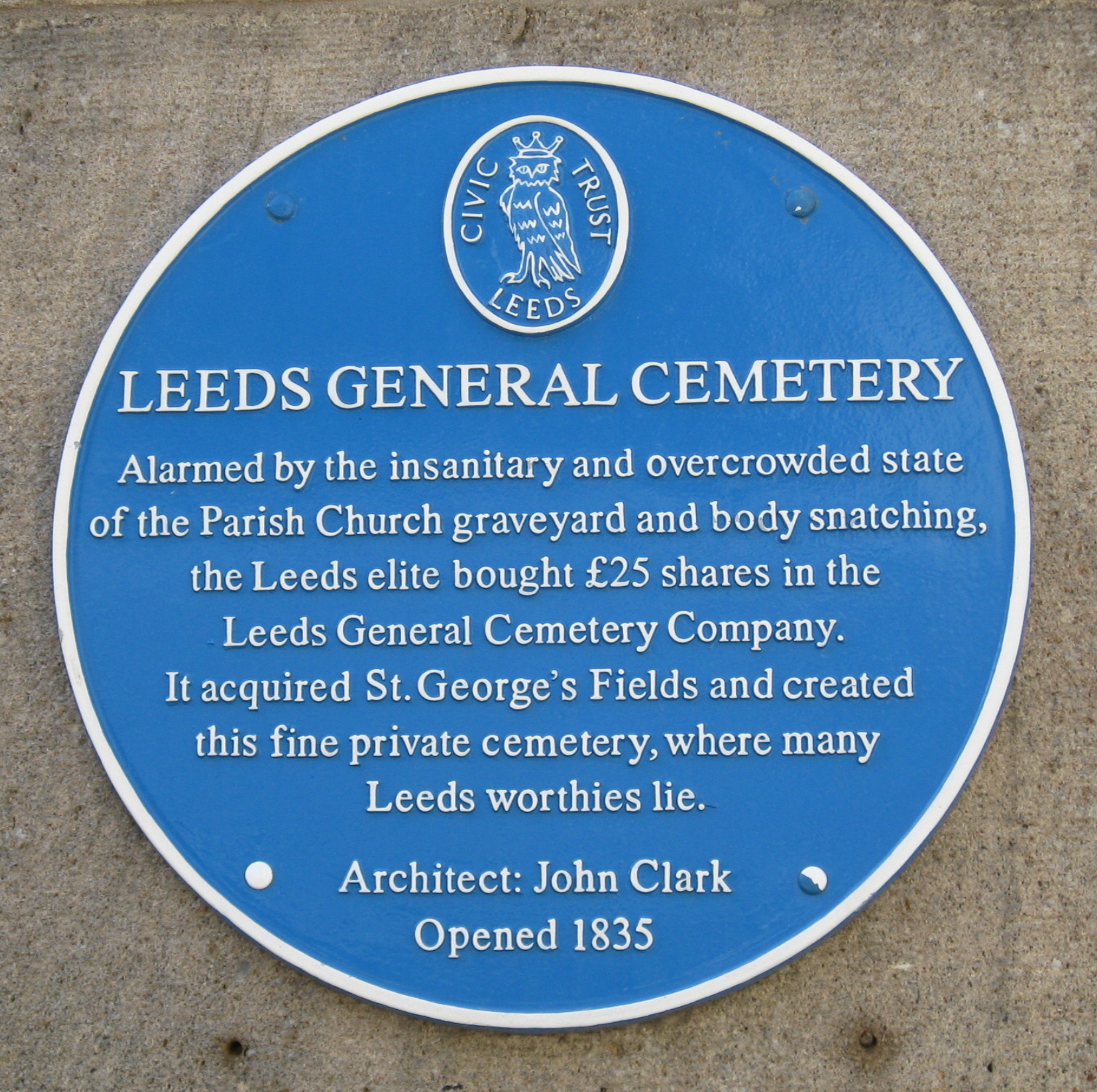
Civic Society blue plaque

The Leeds General Cemetery Company Limited was set up in 1833 to create a new cemetery as that of the parish church was full. The cemetery opened in 1835, and a total of 93,569 interments took place in it.

In 1956 the University of Leeds acquired a majority shareholding in the company and the University of Leeds Act 1965 (c. xix) was passed which allowed the university to remove monuments and create a public open space. The company went into voluntary liquidation in 1967 and the last burial took place in October 1969. From March to November 1968 contractors removed the headstones and memorials, some of which were subsequently collected by Leeds City Museum, some retained and the rest covered with soil which was then grassed over and landscaped. There were no exhumations. The space re-opened to the public in 1969 as St George's Fields (the name of the area before the cemetery was created). It is valued as a quiet space within the busy campus.

== Monuments and burials ==
Notable surviving monuments include those of circus proprietor Pablo Fanque (1796-1871), who was mentioned in the Beatles song "Being for the Benefit of Mr. Kite!" from the LP Sgt. Pepper's Lonely Hearts Club Band and his wife Susannah Darby, and the 1892 Leeds Fire Brigade Memorial. Other notable people who were buried in the cemetery include Leeds artist Atkinson Grimshaw (1836-1893), Victoria Cross holder Charles Hull (1890-1953), Ann Carr (1783-1841) who led the Female Revivalist Society, and Wilson Armistead, abolitionist and founder of the Leeds Anti-Slavery Association.

A total of 105 Commonwealth service personnel of both World Wars were buried in this cemetery. Because their graves could no longer be maintained by the Commonwealth War Graves Commission, they are commemorated by name on a Screen Wall memorial in Lawnswood Cemetery in the same city.

=== Listed buildings ===
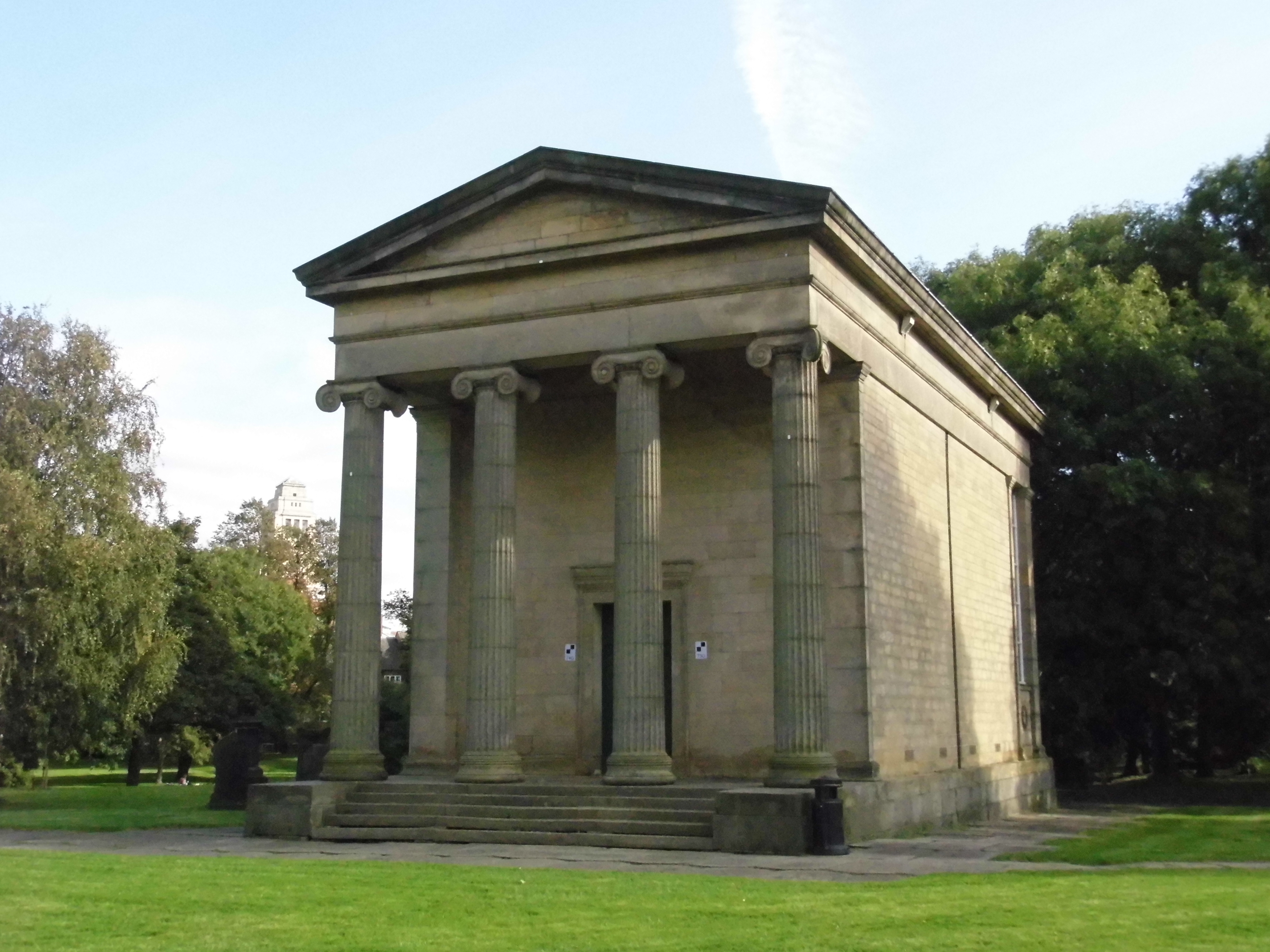
The cemetery chapel

The cemetery chapel, built in 1835, is grade II listed along with a statue of Michael Sadler. The cemetery lodge, the Leeds Fire Brigade Memorial and several groups of monuments are also grade II listed.

=== Burial records ===
Leeds University Library holds an archive of the Leeds General Cemetery Company and the indexed burial registers, which have been digitised and can be searched and viewed freely online.

== See also ==
- Listed buildings in Leeds (Hyde Park and Woodhouse)
