= Ann Carr (evangelist) =

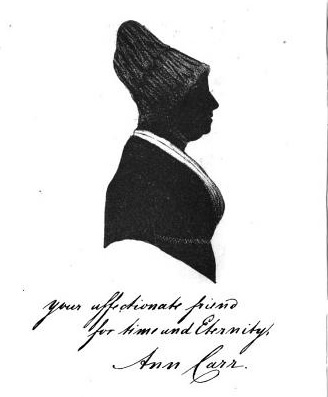
- silhouette
- Born: 4 March 1783; Market Rasen
- Died: 18 January 1841 (aged 57)
- Occupation: Preacher
- Known for: founding the Female Revivalist Society

Ann Carr (4 March 1783 – 18 January 1841) was a British evangelist who founded the Female Revivalist Society. An offshoot of the Primitive Methodists, the Society used female and male preachers.

== Life ==
Carr was born in Market Rasen in 1783 to a poor family. Rebecca, her mother, died when she was young and she was brought up as a Congregationalist by her aunt and her father, Tom, who was a builder. When she was eighteen her boyfriend died and she had a breakdown. At this point she became a Wesleyan, influenced by Zachariah Taft, who was a supporter of women in the church.

Carr became known for her preaching and she would tour England evangelizing for Methodism. She was said to travel 300 miles in some months. In 1816 she went to hear Sarah Kirkland speak in Nottingham and she was attracted to Primitive Methodism. in 1818 she met Hannah Woolhouse and Sarah Eland. She and Eland returned to Carr's Lincolnshire where they created a revival. Carr was warned off allowing "ranters" into her meetings, but she reacted against this and went to Hull to join the Primitive Methodists.

In 1821 William Clowes was so successful in creating converts in Leeds that Carr, Sarah Ecland and Martha Williams were sent from Hull to join him. These new arrivals caused some problems as they were both popular and undisciplined moving from circuit to circuit as the will took them.

Carr eventually founded the Female Revivalist Society in the poor area of Leeds. Her group would meet in cottages. In Morley the group caused a schism in the local Primitive Methodists as the women wanted to hear preachers from the Female Revivalists.

In 1838 Carr and her friend Martha Williams published "A Selection of Hymns for the use of the Female Revivalist Methodists. A new edition, with additional hymns".

When Carr died the financial problems of the church caused it to collapse.

== Recognition ==
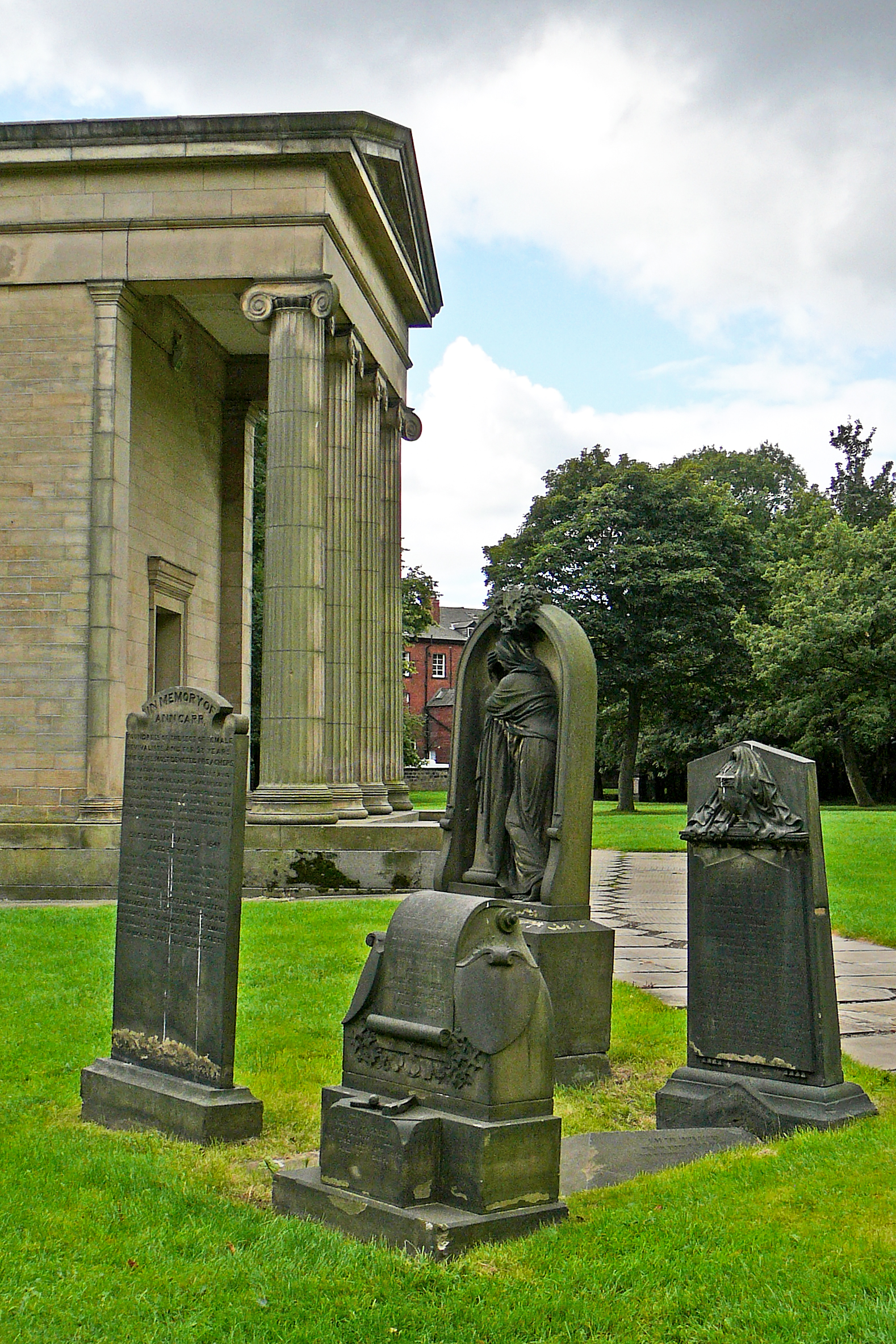
Ann Carr's grave is one of several preserved 10 metres north of Woodhouse Chapel in Leeds

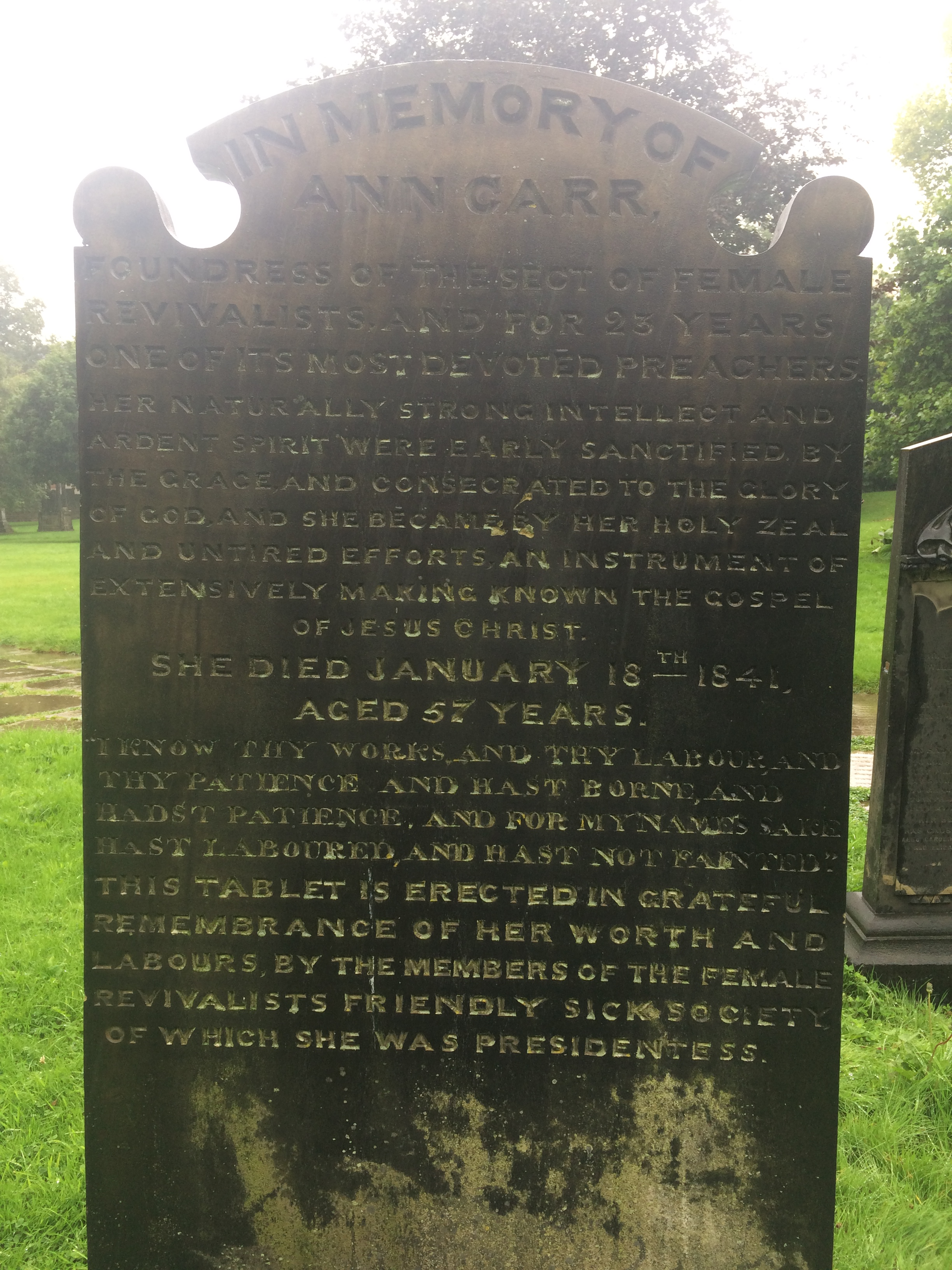
Close up of Ann Carr's grave recording her as the "Foundress of the sect of Female Revivalists"

Carr's friend Martha Williams wrote Carr's biography the same year as Carr's death; it was titled Memoirs of the life and character of Ann Carr: containing an account of her conversion to God, her devoted labours and her happy death.

The monument that was placed on Carr's grave recording her as the "Foundress of the sect of Female Revivalists" was recognised as part of a listed monument in Leeds in 1976. It is one of a number preserved in the remains of Woodhouse Cemetery in what is now the grounds of the University of Leeds.

Carr's name is one of those featured on the sculpture Ribbons, unveiled in 2024.
