= Sarah Crosby =

English Methodist preacher (1729–1804)

- Born: 6 October 1729; Leeds, England
- Died: 29 October 1804 (aged 75); Leeds, England
- Occupations: Class leader (from 1752); Preacher (from 1761)
- Known for: First female Methodist preacher

Ecclesiastical career
- Religion: Methodism

Sarah Crosby (6 October 1729 – 29 October 1804) was an English Methodist preacher, and is considered to be the first woman to hold this title. Crosby, along with Mary Bosanquet, is one of the most popular women preachers of Methodism. Scholars such as Paul Wesley Chilcote consider Crosby to be the busiest female Methodist preacher, as she preached up until the day she died. She was also renowned for being skilled at prayer, which at the time was seen as a sort of religious art form.

== Early life ==
Crosby was born in Leeds on 6 October 1729. Not much is known about her early life, aside from the fact that she enjoyed singing, dancing, and playing cards.

Crosby did not become interested in religion until she began to attend Anglican services when she was 14 years old. She started to develop a fear of death, which became pronounced when she was 17, perhaps because of a bout of illness. As a result, Crosby devoted herself even more to religion, fearing that she would die and be sent to Hell.

In 1750, Crosby married. Not much is known about Mr Crosby, including his first name; similarly, Sarah Crosby's maiden name is not known − she is always addressed as 'Mrs Crosby.' The marriage did not last long; her husband left her on 2 February 1757, after seven years of marriage. It is unclear why the Crosbys separated. Some speculate that Mr Crosby was not a Methodist and discouraged her from practicing her religion. Others have said that Mr Crosby introduced Sarah Crosby to John Wesley's writings, which may have indicated that he was a Methodist. Mr Crosby's religion remains unknown, as do most details about him. Other possible reasons for the end of Crosby's marriage include that Mr Crosby might have been an alcoholic, or that he may have been unfaithful.

== Experiences with the Methodist Church ==
The Foundery, the Methodist chapel where Crosby first began to lead classes

In the winter of 1749, Crosby heard both George Whitefield and John Wesley, the founders of Methodism, preach in London. Though she heard the two founders speak, she was not instantly converted. She held negative views of Wesley and Methodism, which were common at the time. But, after reading some of Wesley's work, she became interested in the denomination. Crosby was converted to Methodism on 29 October 1749. Crosby joined the ranks of the members at The Foundery, a Methodist society, in October 1750. She began to lead her own Methodist classes in 1752. Shortly after becoming a class leader, Crosby experienced a vision of Jesus whilst praying. In her vision, Jesus said: "Feed my sheep." Crosby interpreted this event as God calling her to preach. (See § Preaching).

Crosby had somewhat of a conflict with Wesley's wife, Mary "Molly" Vazeille. In 1758, Crosby wrote to Wesley and, in her letter, made harsh comments about Vazeille. Vazeille saw the letter and was angry and jealous, since she knew that Crosby and Wesley were close friends and often travelled together. It is unknown how but eventually the dispute was resolved, and Crosby and Wesley remained friends.

Crosby met Mary Bosanquet in May 1757, and the two became lifelong friends. During the summer of 1758 Crosby moved to the Moorfields, to live with Bosanquet, Sarah Ryan, and Mary Clark, all of whom would become prominent female figures in Methodism. They worked together to assist the poor and disabled.

=== Charity work ===
==== The Cedars ====
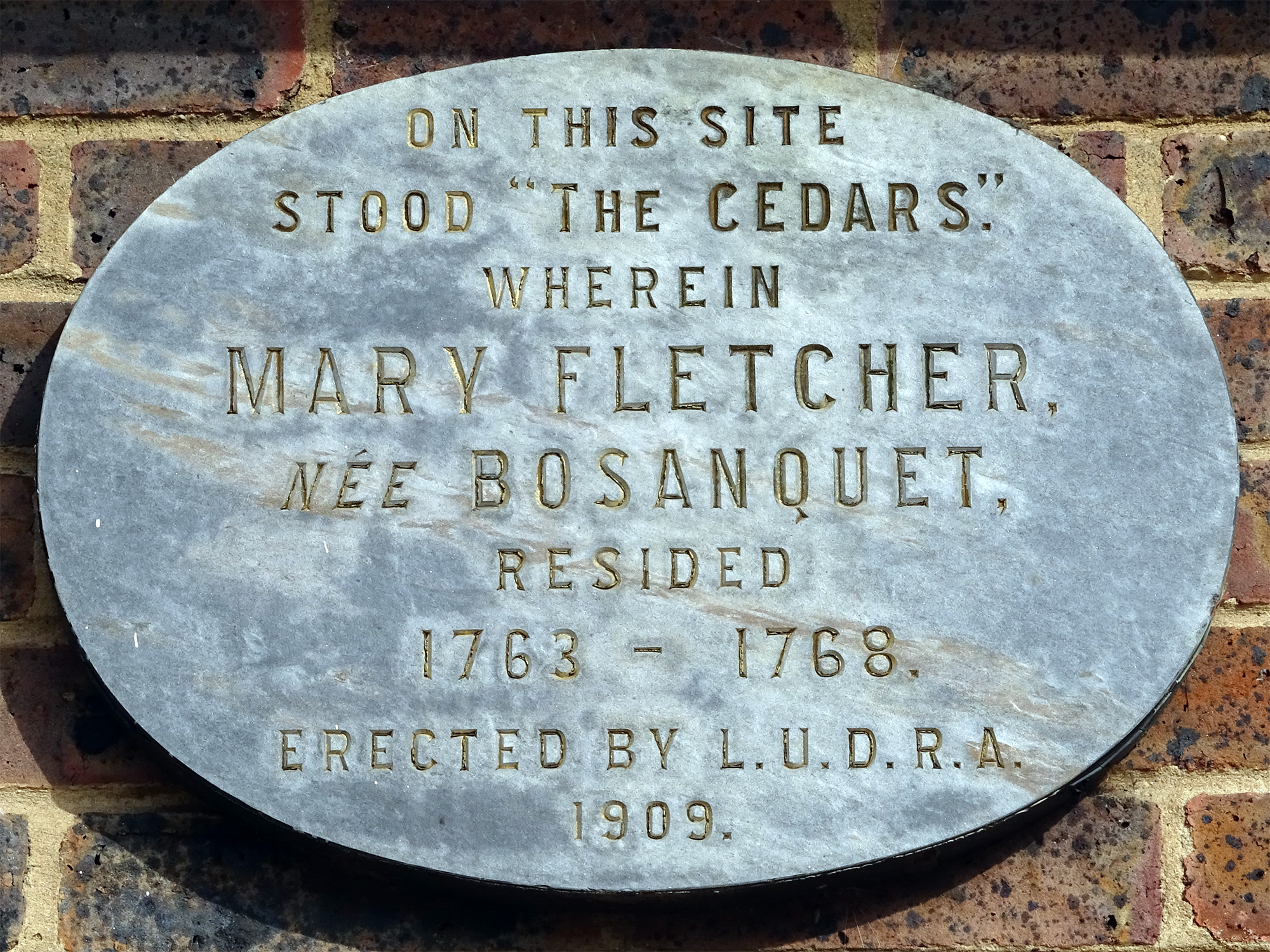
Plaque to The Cedars on the site where it once stood

In 1763, she began working and living with Mary Bosanquet and Sarah Ryan at their orphanage, The Cedars, in Leytonstone. The Cedars was modelled after the Kingswood School, an institution founded by John Wesley.

The women at The Cedars helped to care for 35 children and 34 adults, most of whom were dirty, unclothed, ill, and/or uneducated. Education at The Cedars included instruction in manners, reading, religion, writing, nursing, and domestic skills in order to prepare the children for life beyond the orphanage. The children were subject to harsh physical punishment if they misbehaved.

Bosanquet and Crosby instituted nightly Scriptural readings and prayer. The women asked Wesley to send them a preacher in order to have a more religious environment inside of the orphanage. In response, Wesley sent a Mr Murlin to preach, and soon The Cedars became a Methodist society. Despite this, Bosanquet and Crosby continued to hold their own religious services on Thursday nights and began to attract large crowds. Bosanquet and Crosby were so successful that The Cedars became a centre of Methodism in Leytonstone.

==== Cross Hall ====
Crosby followed Bosanquet and Ryan when they moved their orphanage to Cross Hall farm in Yorkshire in 1768. The move was made from The Cedars to Cross Hall in order to decrease costs (since the women would be able to grow their own food), to give a better environment for the children, and hopefully improve Ryan's failing health. However, Bosanquet and the other women had little to no experience with farm life, and growing their own food did not prove to be as successful as they had hoped. Additionally, shortly after arriving at Cross Hall, Ryan died.

Cross Hall not only served as an orphanage but also became a Methodist centre of activity. Crosby, along with Bosanquet, Sarah "Sally" Lawrence, and Mary Tooth took residence there. Often, Elizabeth Ritchie, Susanna Knapp, and other prominent Methodist women visited.

Bosanquet, who had controlled most of the operations of Cross Hall, closed the orphanage on 2 January 1782 following her marriage to John Fletcher. All of the children were either moved to new homes or found an occupation before the orphanage was closed.

=== Preaching ===
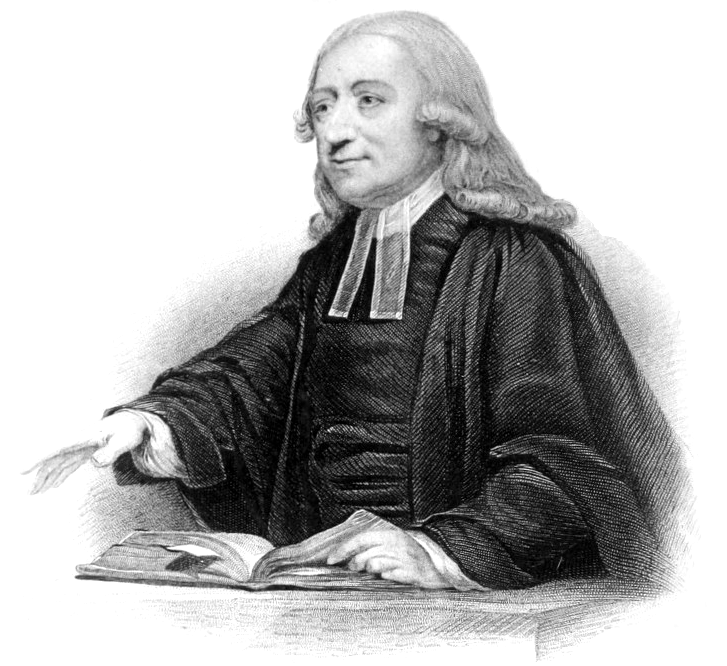
John Wesley (pictured) allowed and encouraged Crosby's preaching.

Crosby's first experience with preaching came in Derby in February 1761. She went to the town on a missionary quest and was instructed to lead classes. The first class that she led went well, and had less than 30 students. However, the following Sunday, over 200 people attended her class. Usually, in a class setting, Crosby would have given individualized advice to a small group of less than 50; however, since there was such a large crowd, she could not do so and decided to preach instead. Her preaching consisted of reading a hymn, praying, and telling a story of how God had impacted her life. On 13 February, she preached again.

Crosby wrote to Wesley to tell him of what she had done and to get his advice. He replied on 14 February, approving of her actions, but cautioned her − he was wary of what others might think if he allowed women to preach in his denomination, so he advised Crosby to try to refrain from the formal language and mannerisms of preaching as much as she could, while permitting her to carry the activity. According to many scholars, this marked the beginning of Wesley's acceptance of women preachers in Methodism, and made Crosby the first woman to receive this title.

While living and working at Cross Hall, Crosby and Bosanquet began to hold Methodist meetings (private, not public) and preach at night, but only because there was no Methodist society in Leytonstone. In 1769, Wesley wrote to Crosby, permitting her to give pieces of spiritual advice, or exhortations, in her preaching. Some Methodist male leaders opposed this practice, but Crosby and Bosanquet continued until Cross Hall's closure.

In 1771, Wesley formally authorized Methodist women to preach in public. This was the direct result of a letter written by Bosanquet to Wesley, defending hers and Crosby's preaching at Cross Hall. Bosanquet argued that women should be allowed to preach in Methodism when they experienced an 'extraordinary call,' or permission, from God. Bosanquet's letter to Wesley is considered to be the first true defence of women's preaching in Methodism. It is also considered to be the argument that persuaded Wesley to give women the provision to preach. Scholar Thomas M. Morrow argues that Wesley only allowed women to preach because they were successful in converting people; he did not have a change of heart, and did not allow women to preach in order to make any sort of statement.

==== Travelling preacher ====
On 13 June 1771, Wesley wrote to Crosby with instructions on how to lead public meetings, since she could now officially preach. Throughout the 1770s, Crosby was a travelling preacher; she wrote that she had travelled 960 miles in the year 1777 alone. Some of the time, she travelled with Wesley. Apparently, Crosby was quite popular, and often spoke to hundreds at her sermons. She once even addressed a crowd of 500–600 people in the rain, despite losing her voice and being sore from travelling. Crosby's preaching was not welcome everywhere, however, and her preaching at Cross Hall was not the only instance in which her work was opposed. During the summer of 1770, Wesley went to preach at a church, and was told that he would not be allowed to because the parishioners had heard about a Methodist woman preaching nearby. Crosby had recently been to a nearby church in Huddersfield, but had only led a class there and did not preach. Wesley did not seem to be angered by the ordeal, and told Crosby that their preaching would be welcomed elsewhere.

Following the closure of Cross Hall, from the 1780s on Crosby was stationed in Leeds. By this time, constant travelling had taken a toll on her health. Rheumatism was making it hard for her to write as well, so she started to record fewer entries in her diary. In 1793 she moved in with her friend and fellow preacher, Ann Tripp. Their house was near a Methodist meeting-place, the Old Boggard House, where she taught two Methodist classes a week. Crosby, along with Ann Tripp, helped to lead The Female Brethren, an association of female Methodist preachers.

Up until she died, Crosby was still active in the Methodist Connexion. She led classes, went to meetings, and preached during the week before her death.

== Death ==
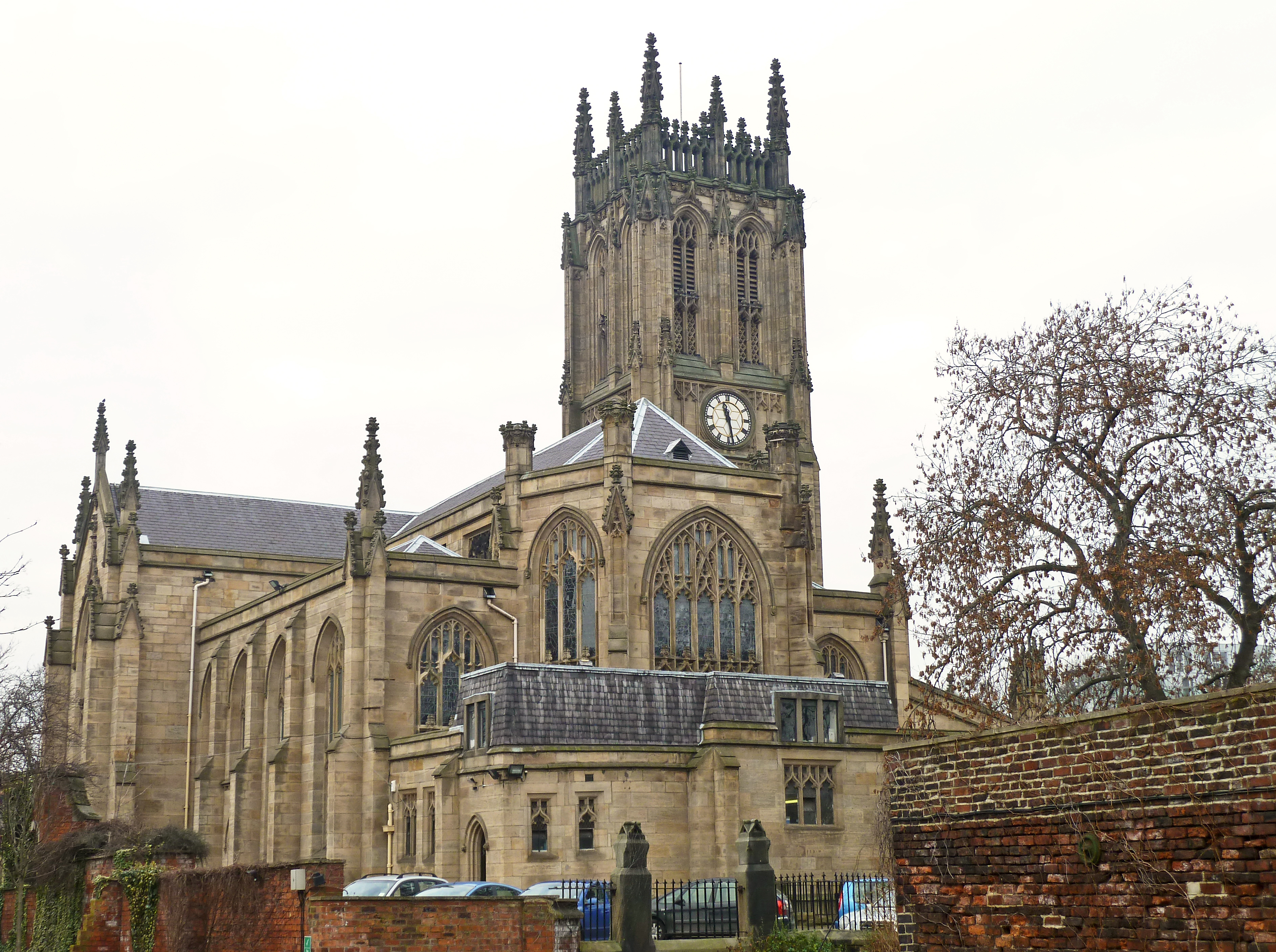
Leeds Parish Church, where Sarah Crosby was buried

On 24 October 1804, at the age of 75, Sarah Crosby died in Leeds. She was buried in a shared grave at Leeds Parish Churchyard with her colleagues Sarah Ryan, and later, Ann Tripp.

== See also ==
- Mary Bosanquet Fletcher
- Sarah Ryan (Methodist)
- Women in Christianity
