= Thomas H. Jones =

American abolitionist & former slave (1806–??)

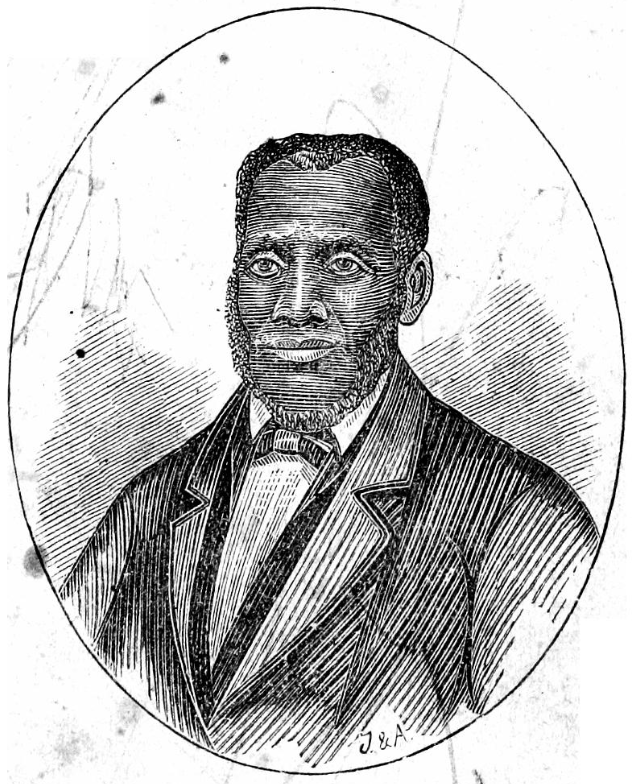
- Born: 1806; Wilmington, NC
- Occupation: Minister
- Movement: Colored Conventions Movement

Rev. Thomas H. Jones (born 1806) was born a slave Wilmington, North Carolina and was a prominent African-American abolitionist in antebellum America. Jones escaped slavery, traveled to Canada and subsequently relocated to Worcester, Massachusetts. Following years of working as an itinerant preacher and lecturer, Jones became a prominent figure within the Colored Conventions Movement. He served as a delegate to the 1859 New England Colored Convention. His narrative, Experience and Personal Narrative of Uncle Tom Jones; Who Was for Forty Years a Slave. Also the Surprising Adventures of Wild Tom, of the Island Retreat, a Fugitive Negro from South Carolina, captures his early life as a slave and his subsequent escape from slavery.

== Early life ==
Born a slave, Jones grew up on the plantation of John Hawes near Wilmington, North Carolina. At the age of nine, Hawes sold him to Mr. Jones, a storekeeper in Wilmington, North Carolina located about 45 miles from Hawes' plantation. Jones reports in his autobiography that, "Mr. Jones sent his slave driver, a colored man, named Abraham, to conduct me to my new home in Washington. I was at home with my mother when he came. He looked in at the door, and called to me, 'Tom, you must go with me.' His looks were ugly and his voice was savage. I was very much afraid, and began to cry, holding on to my mother's clothes and begging her to protect me, and not let the man take me away." Thomas H. Jones took his last name from Mr. Jones the storekeeper, for whom he worked as a house servant and then a store clerk. Jones obtained some education while enslaved by Mr. Jones.

At the age of 20, Thomas married Lucilla Smith, a young woman of 17 and slave to a neighbor, Mrs. Moore. Thomas and Lucilla had three children, Annie, Lizzie, and Charlie. Mrs. Moore eventually was sold to another owner in Newburn, along with the children.

When Thomas was 23, Mr. Jones took ill and died. Thomas was purchased by Owen Holmes for $435.00. Thomas remarried and worked for Holmes as a stevedore until 1849, when he heard that unnamed white men were planning to re-enslave Thomas' wife and children. Thomas moved his family to the free northern states and eventually joined them after stowing away on a brig bound for New York City.

== Activism ==
Upon arriving in the North, Jones started lecturing at abolitionist gatherings and conventions across New England. In 1850, Jones delivered an impassioned speech at the meeting of the Massachusetts Anti-Slavery Society. Slave hunters forced Jones to relocate to New Brunswick and Nova Scotia where he continued to lecture, frequently attracting large audiences. He returned to Massachusetts in August 1853, at which time he began writing his autobiography, The Experience of Thomas Jones (1854). In 1859 Jones spoke before the New England Colored Citizens' Convention in Boston.

In July 1850 he met British abolitionist Wilson Armistead in a chance encounter on a train travelling from Lynn to Boston. Armistead described how Jones, "a fugitive from the horrors of slavery","furnished me with a few particulars of his history, as [sic] also of the providential escape of his family (a wife and three children), whom he succeeded in aiding away previously."

== Legacy ==
Thomas Jones Primary School in London is named in his honour.
