= Sarah Ryan (Methodist) =

English Methodist and charity worker

- Born: 20 October 1724
- Died: 17 August 1768 (aged 43); Gildersome, United Kingdom
- Occupation: Orphan keeper
- Known for: Co-founder of The Cedars

Sarah Ryan (20 October 1724 – 17 August 1768) was a Methodist charity worker, best known for her controversial early life and for her charity work. Ryan was often criticized by her fellow Methodists because of her three 'marriages'. Despite her tarnished reputation, Ryan was very active in the Methodist Church. Notably, Ryan co-founded a Methodist orphanage/school named The Cedars with Mary Bosanquet Fletcher. Ryan's work at The Cedars was highly praised by John Wesley, the co-founder of Methodism.

== Early life ==
Sarah Ryan was born on 20 October 1724, but is not known where or to whom – not even her maiden name is known. She had five siblings.

Ryan's father was an alcoholic, which led to financial problems in her family. Her father spent most of their funds on alcohol, and neglected the family business. At one point, Ryan's brother, who was only twelve years old, took over the family business. But shortly afterward, Ryan's brother drowned, leaving possession of the family business back in her father's hands. Much of the family's belongings were sold to pay their debts. When she was ten, Ryan became a domestic servant to support her family.

== Marriage and relationships ==
Sarah Ryan had three romantic partners. She met the first while working in her mother's shop. His name is not known, but Ryan explains in her autobiography that she left him because he was a bigamist. She also said that he would also try to force Ryan into prostitution.

Mr Ryan was Sarah Ryan's husband. He was an Irish merchant who was often at sea. According to her writings, it seems that Mr Ryan's absence caused Sarah Ryan to take on a third partner, Solomon Benneken (sometimes written Benreken), an Italian Jewish man. Like Mr Ryan, Benneken was also often away at sea, since he worked as a cook for the East India Company. Ryan would spend her time with whoever happened to be at home. Ryan desired Benneken more, and considered their relationship more valid than hers with Mr Ryan. But, she could not see a way to escape her relationship with Mr Ryan and married him. Some accounts say that Mr Ryan pretended to be ill in order to trick Sarah into marrying him.

Mr Ryan abused her in their marriage, and Sarah had to support the couple by taking in laundry and doing domestic service work. Mr Ryan gave Sarah a sexually transmitted infection, which sent her to the hospital. There, she saw the sufferings of the other women in the ward, and felt herself to be in a place of "Bad women." Shortly after this, she converted to Methodism, though Mr Ryan did not approve of her decision. She saw herself as a martyr as she suffered from Mr Ryan's abuse due to her choice of religion. In 1754, Ryan left her husband.

Ryan's three relationships caused her trouble, especially in Methodist spheres. Once, Mary Wesley, John Wesley's wife, called Ryan a "whore" while she was serving them dinner. In order to redeem her public image, Ryan disclosed the truth of her three 'marriages' in an autobiography. She described all of them as being unhappy, and cast herself as a victim, in order to gain sympathy.

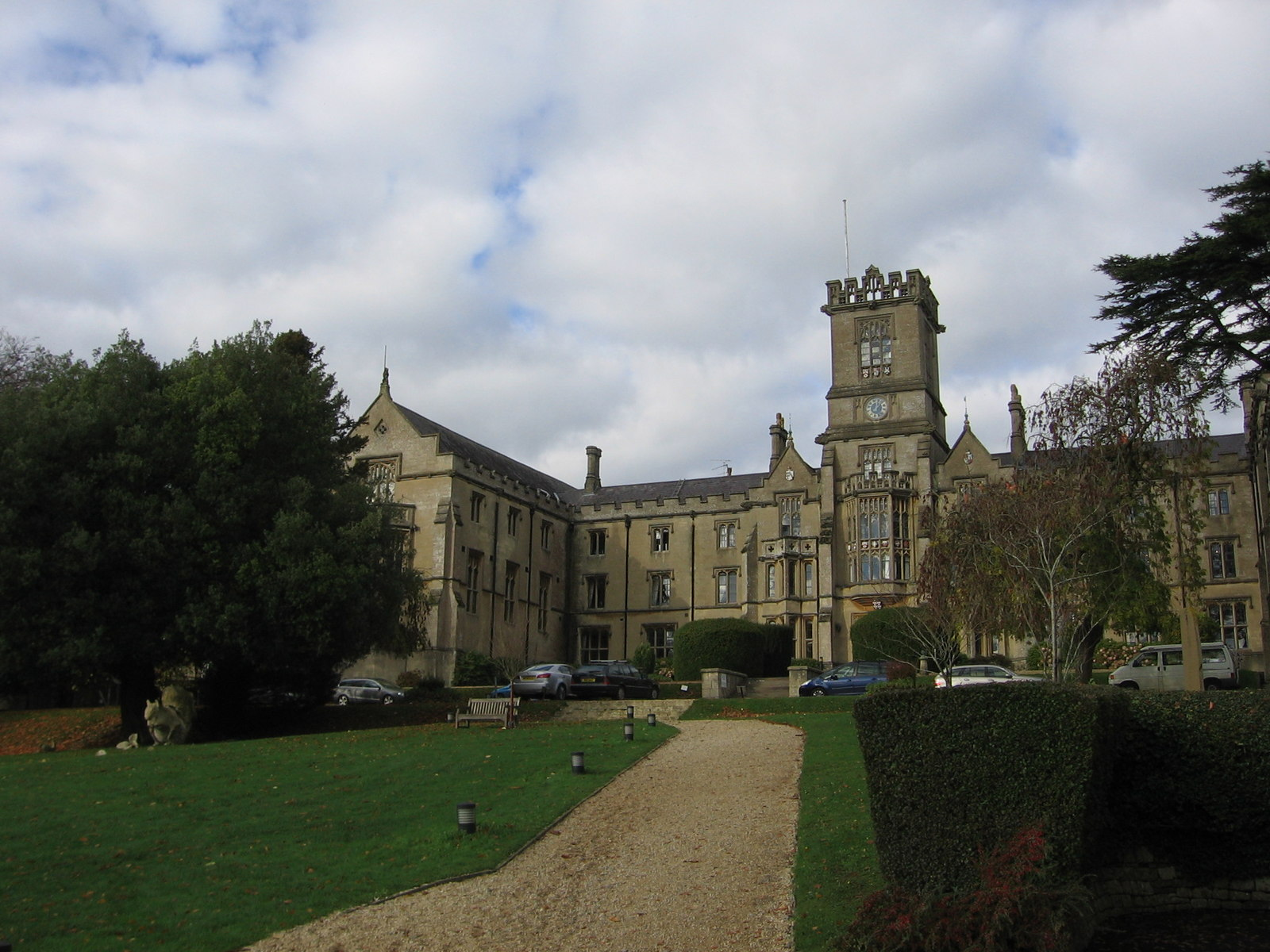
Kingswood School, where Sarah Ryan worked.

== Experiences with the Methodist Church ==
When Ryan was seventeen, she heard George Whitefield, one of the founders of Methodism, preaching. She greatly enjoyed listening to Whitefield, but was not yet converted. It was not until a few years later, in 1754, when she heard John Wesley – the other founder of Methodism – preach that she fully converted to Methodism.

In 1757 Wesley made Ryan a housekeeper at the Kingswood School, a Methodist institution that he established. Despite her lack of experience in education, she apparently did well at the school, and Wesley commended her work.

=== Charity work ===
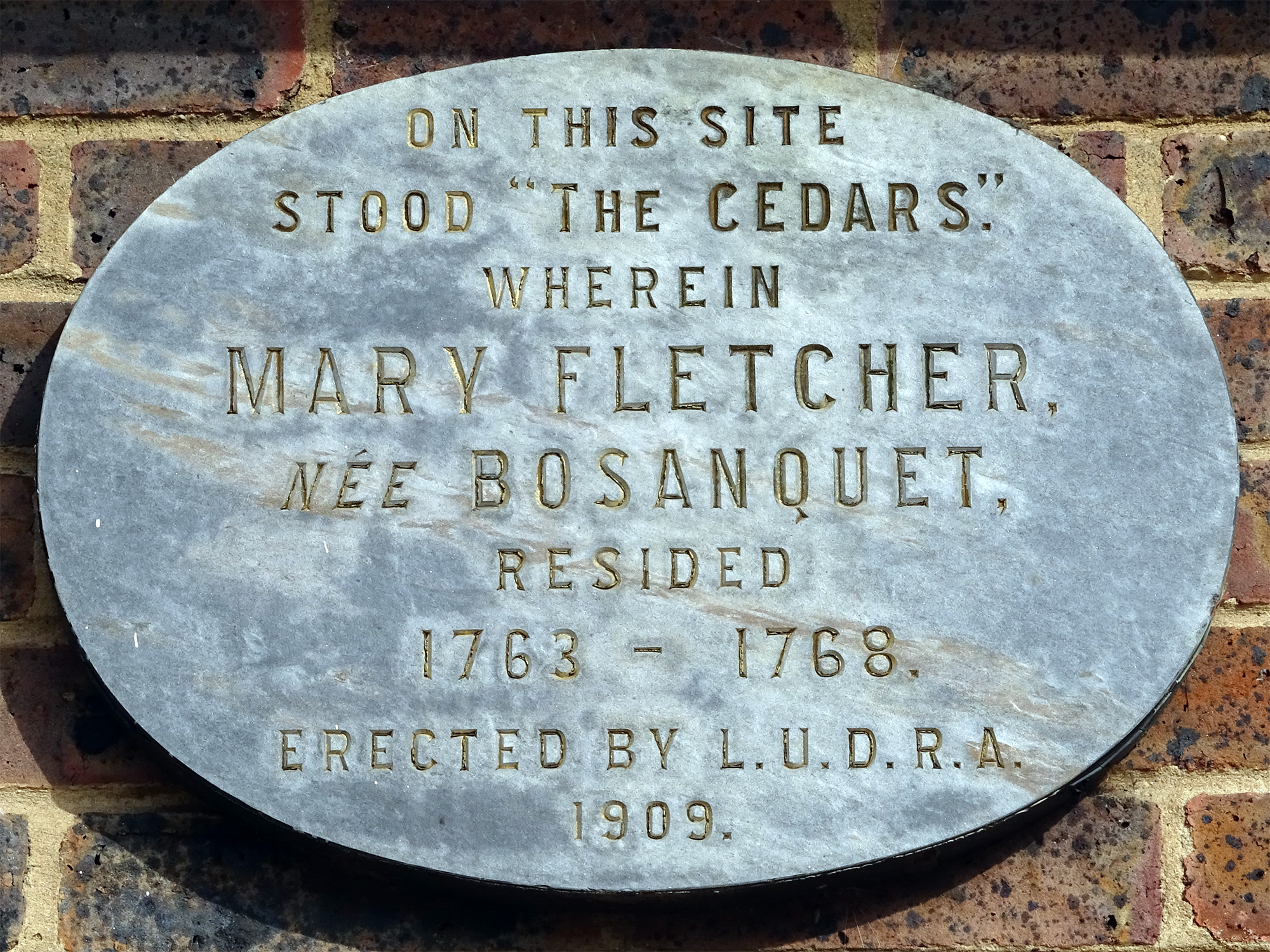
Plaque on the site where The Cedars once stood. The plaque refers to Mary Bosanquet.

Sarah Ryan was quite close with another Methodist, Mary Bosanquet Fletcher. Ryan shared her experiences of working at John Wesley's Kingswood School with Bosanquet, and in March of 1763, the pair sought to establish a similar orphanage/school. They did so at 'The Cedars,' one of the Bosanquet family's properties in Leytonstone. Ryan and Bosanquet hired a maid to assist them. They also took in Ryan's orphaned niece, Sarah "Sally" Lawrence. As they took in more residents, Ryan's health began to decline. For more assistance, they hired Ann Tripp as a governess. Sarah Crosby and Mary Clark also came to help Ryan and Bosanquet at The Cedars.

The Cedars took in members of the poor from London. Uniforms were dark purple cotton, and residents were required to all eat together. Manners, reading, religion, writing, nursing, and domestic skills were on the curriculum. If any of the children misbehaved, they were subject to physical punishment.

The Cedars supported 35 children and 34 adults in its five year run. Usually, there were 15 to 20 − mostly girls − staying at The Cedars. Ryan and Bosanquet's work at The Cedars was praised heavily by Wesley. But The Cedars did not receive only good praise. When Bosanquet and Ryan first began their endeavour, locals were not happy with their efforts. Crowds threw dirt at anyone who came out of the house. Ryan and Bosanquet were also constantly yelled at and spied on.

==== Illness and death ====
In 1768, Ryan was becoming very ill. Mary Bosanquet decided to move the orphanage to give Ryan fresh air, among other reasons. However, whilst on the way to the new location for the orphanage, Sarah Ryan died, on 17 August 1768 in Gildersome. She was buried at Leeds Old Church.

== Legacy ==
Several articles were published about Ryan following her death in Arminian Magazine, a Methodist publication. Some of these articles included excerpts from her diaries and letters. However, the more controversial details of her life, such as her three marriages, were edited out of the articles that were published.

Following Ryan's death, Mary Bosanquet Fletcher proceeded with her plan to move their orphanage to a new location. She established Cross Hall in Morley, and continued with the work that she and Ryan started at The Cedars.

== See also ==
- Mary Bosanquet Fletcher
