= Wilson Armistead =

English abolitionist and writer (1819–1868)

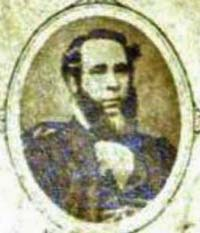
- Born: 30 August 1819 Leeds, England
- Died: 18 February 1868 (aged 48) Leeds, England
- Resting place: Woodhouse Cemetery
- Occupation: Flax and mustard manufacturer; abolitionist
- Subject: Abolition
- Notable works: A Tribute for the Negro
- Spouse: Mary Armistead née Bragg (1844-1868)
- Children: Joseph John: Arthur Wilson; Anthony Wilson; Sarah Mercia; Mary Louisa

Wilson Armistead (30 August 1819 – 18 February 1868) was an English businessman, abolitionist and writer from Leeds. He led the Leeds Anti-Slavery Association and wrote and edited anti-slavery texts. His best known work, A Tribute for the Negro, was published in 1848 in which he describes slavery as "the most extensive and extraordinary system of crime the world ever witnessed". In 1851 he hosted Ellen and William Craft, including them on the census return as 'fugitive slaves' in an act that has been described as "guerrilla inscription".

According to prominent African-American abolitionist William Wells Brown "Few English gentlemen have done more to hasten the day of the slave’s liberation than Wilson Armistead".

== Early life ==
Wilson Armistead was born in Leeds on 30 August 1819 to Joseph and Hannah Armistead and grew up in Holbeck where his family's flax and mustard business was located at Water Hall. The Quaker meeting house was very close by in Water Lane, and in the words of Wilfred Allott the Armistead family had long been "faithful Friends". Armistead married Mary Bragg in 1844 and their first child, a son called Joseph John was born in 1846. The couple would go on to have a further four children, two more sons and two daughters.

== Intellectual life and activism ==
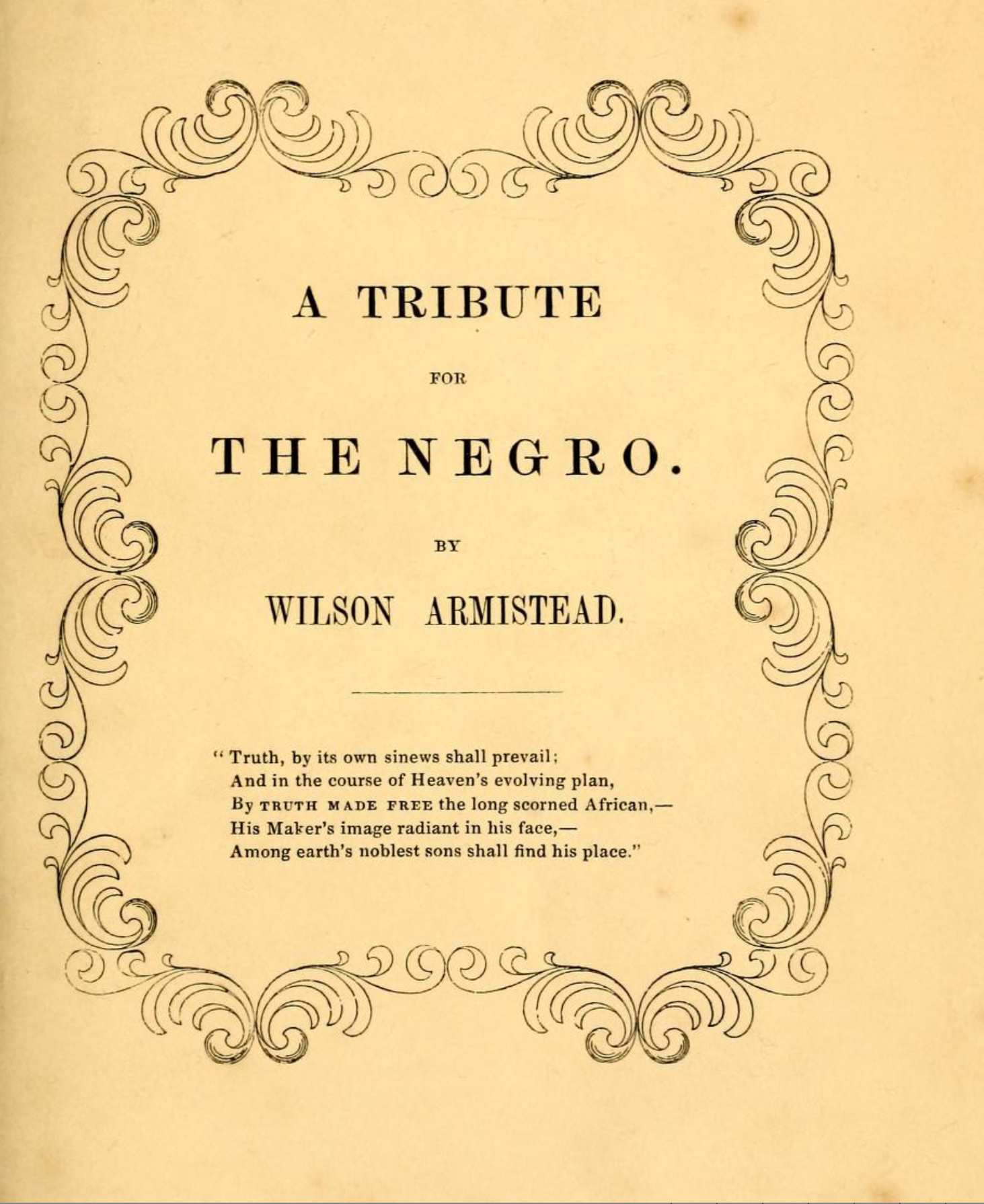
Title page from A Tribute for the Negro by Wilson Armistead, published in 1848

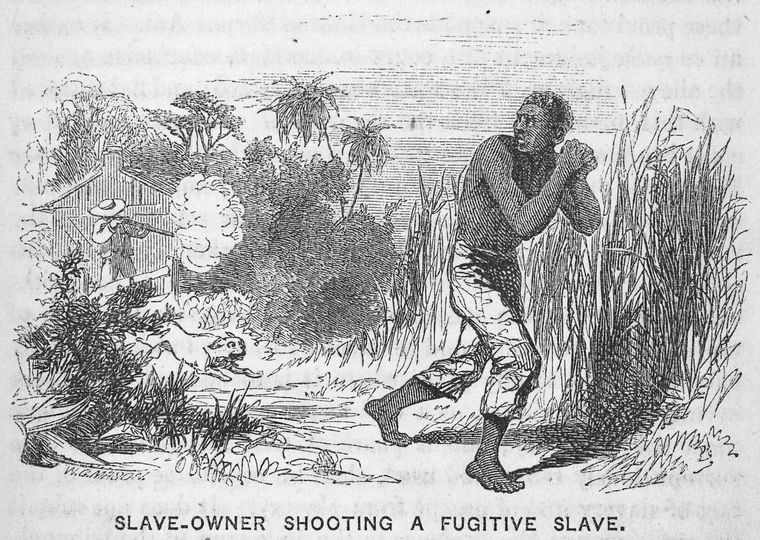
Slave-owner shooting a fugitive slave, from 500,000 strokes for freedom: a series of anti-slavery tracts (1853) by Wilson Armistead (New York Public Library)

Armistead's passionate opposition to slavery and "all distinctions of colour" was evident in his earliest writing and he was only 21 when he published The Memoirs of Paul Cuffe: a man of colour in 1840. Calumny Refuted by Facts from Liberia and Slavery Illustrated in the Histories of Zangara and Maquama, Two Negroes stolen from Africa were published in 1848 and 1849 respectively. In his introductions to both The Memoirs of James Logan (1851) and Life of Anthony Benezet (1867) Armistead refers to himself as a compiler and he is recognised for this talent rather than author of original work. In 1852 he published an edition of the founder of the Quakers George Fox's journal, first published in 1664, which he annotated with numerous historical and biographical footnotes.

By the 1840s he was active in the family business and eventually would head the firm. At this time, he was raising a young family and increasingly involved in abolitionist activity. He was a member of the Leeds Library, a private subscription library founded in 1768 which provided him with both a professional and ideological network. His activism extended to pacifism and he is recorded at a lecture by George Thompson in Spring 1855 where, along with Thompson, he represented a minority voice urging the Government to promote peace in Crimea. In a letter published in the Leeds Mercury newspaper on 29 November 1859, he condemned John Brown's raid on Harpers Ferry. Like many quakers, there is also evidence that Armistead supported the temperance movement and in June 1854 he became a member of an auxiliary committee to the United Kingdom Alliance.

The Leeds Anti Slavery Association was founded in 1853 with Armistead as its president and his wife as librarian and developed from an earlier ladies' committee formed by Sarah Pugh and Harriet Lupton. In September 1853, Armistead welcomed Harriet Beecher Stowe on behalf of the Association, acknowledging the impact of her anti-slavery novel Uncle Tom's Cabin. Five years previously in 1848, Armistead had published his most influential work A Tribute for the Negro which Irene Goodyear suggests represents a rare example of Armistead's creative writing ability, comprising 150 biographical sketches and "a well-reasoned argument covering fifteen chapters". As of 2020, it was still used as an academic text to teach about the abolition of slavery. Sources for Tribute provide evidence that he was in regular correspondence with high-profile abolitionists of the day including fellow Quaker and founder of the British and Foreign Antislavery Society, Joseph Sturge, as well as Joseph Jenkins Roberts, Governor of Liberia.

In June 1850 Armistead visited the United States where he met notable African Americans including escaped slave and abolitionist Samuel Ringgold Ward, Robert Morris, Macon Allen, both lawyers and prominent abolitionist William Lloyd Garrison, as well as Ellen and William Craft, slaves from Macon, Georgia who had escaped to the North in 1848. On the same trip, in July 1850, he also describes an encounter on a train with Thomas H. Jones, a self-emancipated fugitive slave from Wilmington, North Carolina. Soon afterwards the Crafts were forced to escape to England after the Fugitive Slave Act was passed in September 1850 and their former masters sent agents to Boston after them. While in England the Crafts undertook a lecture tour and were accommodated by Wilson and Mary Armistead on 30 March 1851 when the census was taken. As head of the household, Wilson Armistead recorded his guests as “Fugitives from slavery in America, the land of their nativity” which was covered extensively in the press of the day as an unusual act of abolitionist activism. In a strongly worded article on 12 April 1851, the Leeds Mercury reported on "a remarkable return in the census", and the 'disgrace' that "America's own born citizens are driven to seek refuge in a foreign clime from the man-stealer, and from the horrors of slavery."

Armistead continued to correspond with Garrison, writing to him in 1853 and forwarding "loose tracts of the Leeds Antislavery series as a donation for the Boston Antislavery Bazaar, for sale or distribution". Later when Garrison visited Yorkshire in 1867, Armistead welcomed him to address the citizens of Leeds at the Town Hall, though the event was reportedly "numerically not well attended", and by that time slavery had been abolished in the United States by the Thirteenth Amendment to the United States Constitution in December, 1865.

A second book, God’s Image in Ebony, was published in 1854 while he edited a collection of abolitionist writing, 500,000 Strokes For Freedom in 1853. From 1855 to 1859 he promoted the publication of the Leeds Anti Slavery's own journal, The Antislavery Pilot and later, in 1867, published another book Life of Anthony Benezet as well as a pamphlet in 1865 advocating public libraries for Liberia and Sierra Leone. He also wrote widely on Quakers and Quakerism as well as on subjects unrelated to slavery or to his religion such as Tales and Legends of the English Lakes and Mountains published in 1855. In total 46 titles were attributed to him with more than half addressing slavery and much of the remainder Quakerism.

In 1857 the Leeds Anti Slavery Association was succeeded by the Leeds Young Men's Anti Slavery society of which Armistead was president and librarian.

== Later life and death ==
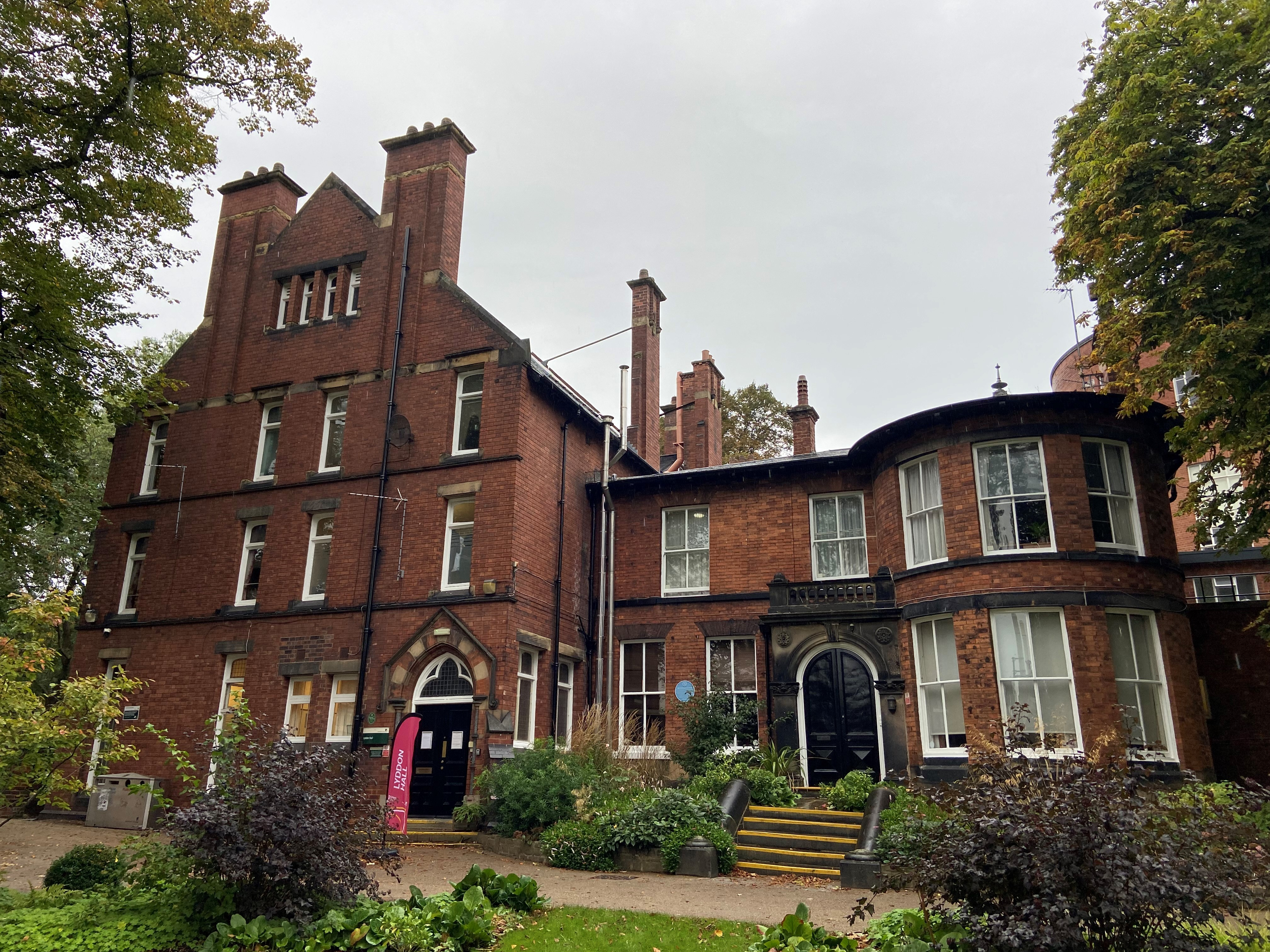
Lyddon Hall on the University of Leeds campus, part of which was previously "Virginia Cottage" where Wilson Armistead spent his final years

Armistead lived mostly in the Little Woodhouse area of Leeds before moving with his growing family to Beech Grove Terrace. The last years of his life, from 1865 until his death in 1868, were spent in the ironically named "Virginia Cottage" belonging to his father and named in 1828 by a previous owner, a Leeds tobacco merchant who had made their living selling slave-produced tobacco from the state of Virginia. The house is now part of Lyddon Hall on the University of Leeds campus. During this time, as treasurer of the Leeds Freedmen's Aid Association, he was occupied raising money to support the thousands of freed slaves "suddenly cast upon their own resources by the American war" and in February 1866 was able to send a remittance of £1,000 to the secretary of the Eastern Department of the American Freedmen's Aid Commission in New York, a sum that "exceeded the expectation of the most sanguine".

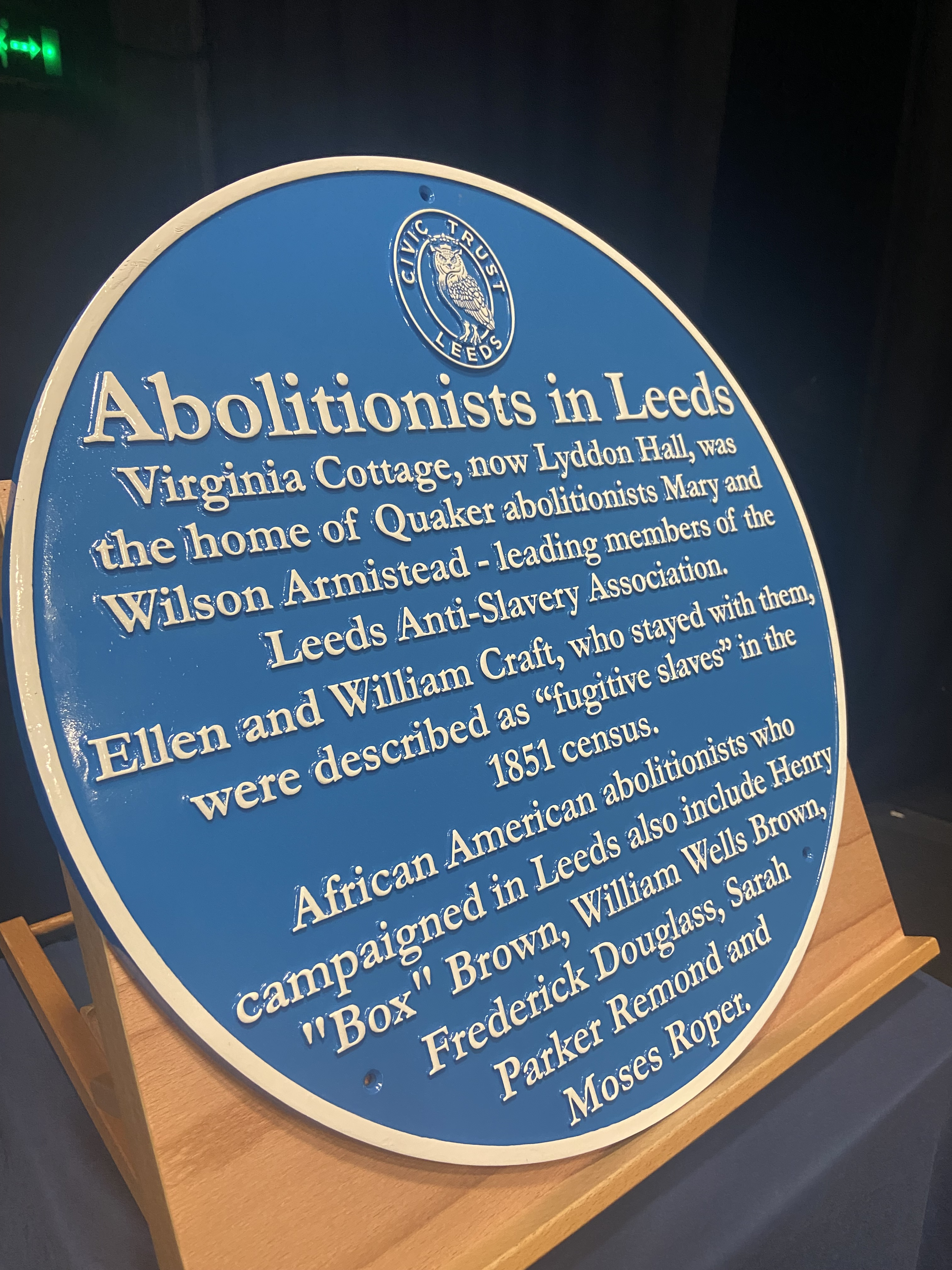
Blue plaque celebrating abolitionists in Leeds unveiled at a public lecture at the University of Leeds on 1st October 2024

The final meeting Armistead is recorded as having attended was that for William Lloyd Garrison at Leeds Town Hall in October 1867 where "he read a congratulatory address to Mr Garrison on the success of his labours." One of his final acts before his death on 18 February 1868 was to send books to a Moravian mission in Jamaica.

Armistead's health was poor for a number of years that has been attributed to his work load and late hours. In addition to his abolitionist work, he was head of a struggling family business that contributed to his stress and his son later recalled that the business did not prosper until he and his brother took over its running.

The cause of death recorded in the Leeds General Cemetery Registers is peritonitis, while his obituary in the Leeds Times attributes his death to "internal gout". He was buried on 22 February 1868 in Woodhouse Cemetery, now also within the University of Leeds campus. The Quaker magazineThe Friend records his death in its issue of 2 March 1868, as "At his residence, Virginia House, Leeds, aged 49".

A memorial document presented to his widow Mary at a meeting of the Leeds Freedmen's Aid Association laments his loss as "the heart of the anti-slavery party in Leeds".
