= A Tribute for the Negro =

1848 anti-slavery book by Wilson Armistead

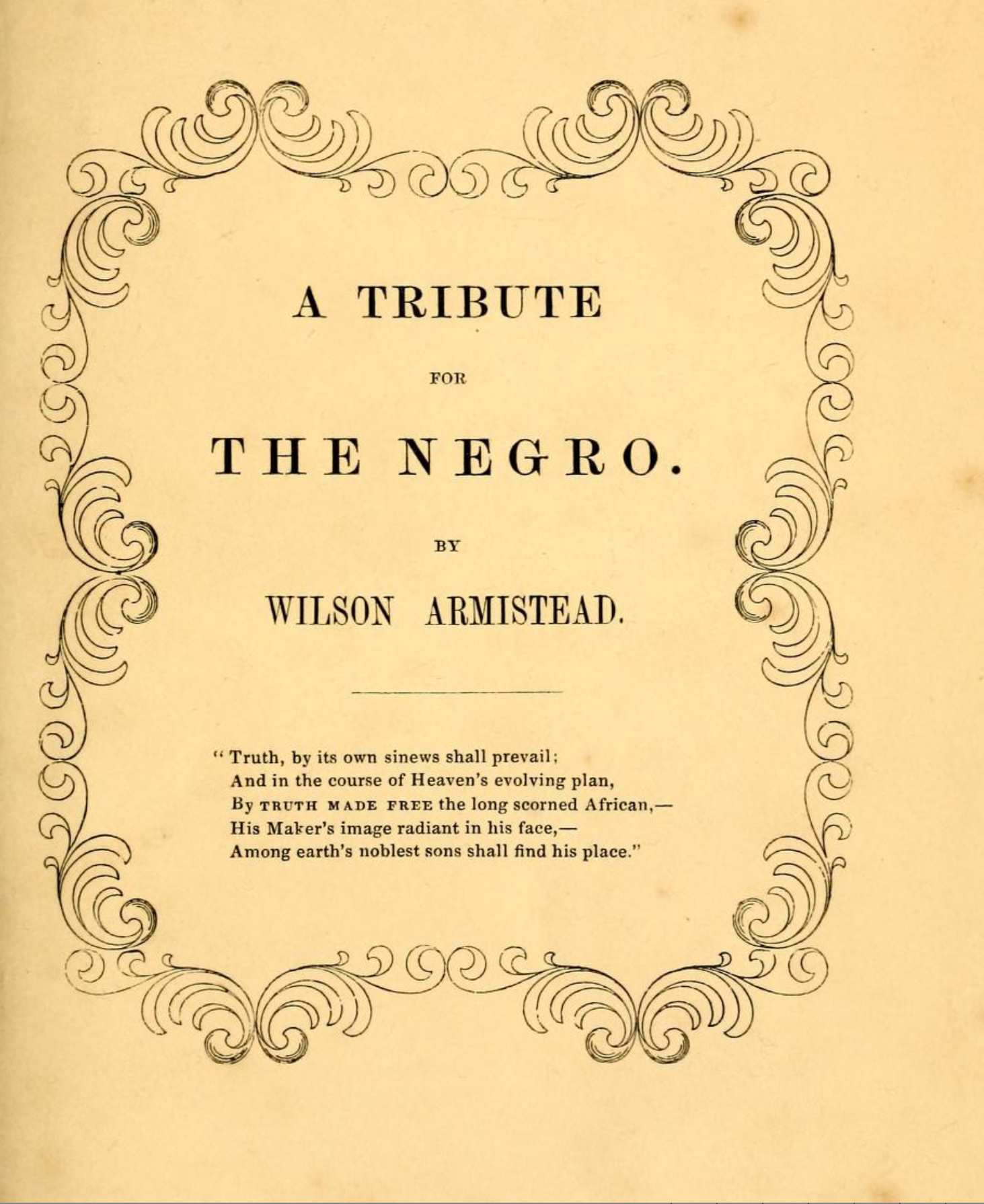
- Author: Wilson Armistead
- Subject: Anti-slavery
- Genres: Political philosophy
- Publication date: 1848
- Publication place: United Kingdom
- OCLC: 51815739
- LC Class: HT1581 .A6
- Text: A Tribute for the Negro at Internet Archive

A Tribute for the Negro: Being a Vindication of the Moral, Intellectual, and Religious Capabilities of the Coloured Portion of Mankind; with Particular Reference to the African Race is an 1848 work written by the Leeds-based British abolitionist Wilson Armistead, that published indictments of scientific racism, as well as slavery, and included biographies of a number of prominent campaigners including Henry Highland Garnet and Phyllis Wheatley. It was one of a number of anti-slavery books published in the 1800s by social reformers. The book was dedicated to James Pennington, Frederick Douglass, Alexander Crummell, "as well as many other elevated noble examples of elevated humanity of the negro". Its purpose was to argue and present evidence for the accomplishments of African Americans and act as a treatise of support. One of the didactic tools used by Armistead in the book is to draw comparisons between Britain's Roman past and its cruelties, to argue for more progressive views on abolition. The book was published by subscription with an extensive list of nearly 1000 subscribers comprising the most 'conspicuous' philanthropists of the day and including "the Sovereign of the most enlightened country of the world", which it has been suggested refers to Queen Victoria.

== Reception ==
Douglass himself had a mixed reaction to the book: he was displeased with the fact that the image of him included was doctored to make him appear to be smiling. In his 1849 review, published in the North Star, he was also critical of further illustrations in the book, stating that white artists could not create "impartial portraits" of African Americans. Overall, Douglass felt the poorness of the images reduced the impact of the message of the prose. In later editions of the book, the image of Douglass was changed to one created by an American, rather than a British, engraver.

By 1868 the work was inspiring other authors: Africanus Horton used it as inspiration for his book Western African Countries. In 1883 the book was described by The Atlantic as "encyclopaedic" in its coverage of African American achievements. In 1905, it was also used as a source by Samuel Richard Brew Attoh Ahuma for his volume Memoirs of West African Celebrities . . . (1700–1850).

== Historiography ==
George Shepperson has argued that the book is potentially the single most important ideological influence on African political thought while historian Herman E. Thomas has emphasised its importance, both in the study of the reception of James Pennington, but as a text providing positive examples of African American life. Nevertheless, historian Jasmine Cobb has described how the poor depiction of African American people in works such as A Tribute for the Negro perpetuated misconceptions of them to audiences, despite the positive intentions of the authors. Meanwhile, critic and historian, Henry Louis Gates Jr. classified the depictions as a series of racist caricatures that Douglass spoke out on. Julia Sun-Joo Lee has discussed how criticism of the portrait in Britain came from Charles Dickens, although it is unclear whether his objections were the same as Douglass' or were based more on an exoticisation of Douglass, and other black abolitionists, that was popular at the time.

The book has also been analysed as part of a study that used machine learning to examine 'culture word' vocabulary in Civil War-era texts. The results demonstrated the A Tribute for the Negro had the highest volume of this kind of vocabulary, demonstrating that the author was purposely using vocabulary that white readers would respect.
