= Leeds Anti-Slavery Association =

Abolitionist organization in England

- Leeds Anti-Slavery Association
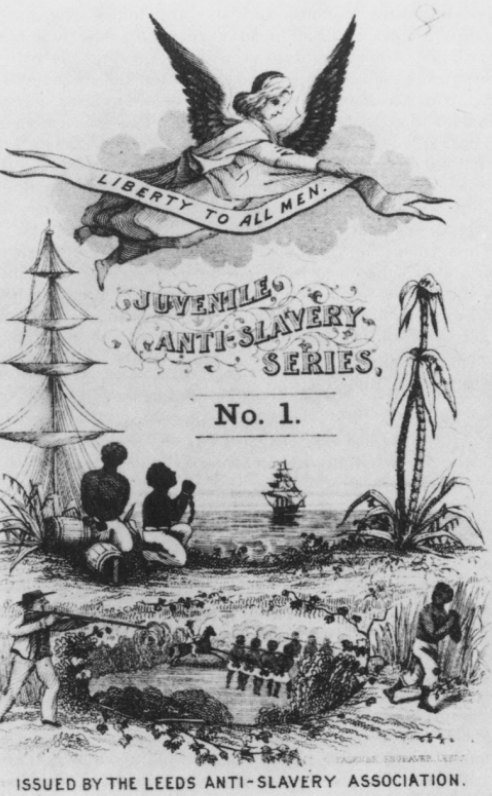
- Juvenile Anti-Slavery Series published by Leeds Anti-Slavery Association
- Formation: 1853
- Founder: Wilson Armistead

Leeds Anti-Slavery Association was an abolitionist society established in Leeds in 1853 and founded by Wilson Armistead. It was the first such organisation to allow women to be members and to take committee roles. The association was active in Leeds, Yorkshire and North America, supplying abolitionist pamphlets to people on the east coast.

== History ==
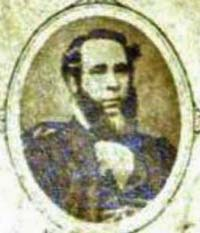
Wilson Armistead

The Leeds Anti-Slavery Association was founded in 1853 by Wilson Armistead, a Quaker abolitionist who had visited America to see the experiences that enslaved people faced and to meet with other abolitionists there. Armistead was a notable abolitionist who in 1848 published A Tribute for the Negro. It was the first organisation of it kind to enable women to take an active role in its campaigning. Women as well as men were officers and committee members, and also comprised the majority of its membership. Harriet Lupton helped form the anti-slavery association with her friend the American Quaker Sarah Pugh: “Pugh and Lupton Initially formed a ladies committee to collect signatures for the Stafford House address” Lupton’s aim with the anti-slavery moment was initially to create a women’s society, but lack of enthusiasm led to a more radical experiment with a mixed-sex organisation. Eventually there was “a total 110 women and 77 male subscribers”. Its librarian was Mary Bragg, who was the wife of its president and founder, Wilson Armistead.

The Association organised meetings that hosted notable abolitionists and speakers including Harriet Beecher Stowe and Samuel Ringgold Ward.

The association ran its own journal which published the accounts of enslavement and abolitionist texts. The Leeds Anti-Slavery Series was a series of 82 anti-slavery tracts, which, according to historian Kimberly Blockett, were published not with home readers in mind, but in order to overwhelm "the eastern shores of the United States with a half million prints of anti-slavery sentiments from England". The publications were also gathered together and published in a single volume. The Association published the Leeds Anti-Slavery Juvenile Series, aimed at children. Armistead used his own business at Water Hall in Holbeck as a distribution centre for his abolitionists pamphlets.

In 1854 the association launched an essay competition, with prizes of 200 guineas and 100 guineas for first and second place. The title entrants had to write to was "On the sinfulness of slavery, the mode of terminating it and the benefits that would result therefrom". The Association hosted talks and hosted meetings, with notable abolitionists coming to speak. Speakers included the author Harriet Beecher Stowe, who stayed at the home of Edward Baines. On 10 December 1855 a meeting was held at Belgrave Chapel, where the speakers included Parker Pillsbury, an American abolitionist. This built on an existing programme of abolitionist speakers visiting Leeds; one such speaker was Frederick Douglass who delivered a lecture entitled "England Should Lead the Cause of Emancipation" on 23 December 1846.

In 1857 the Association established the Leeds Young Men's Anti-Slavery Society, of which Armistead was Honourable Secretary.
