= Julia Lee (writer) =

American writer and professor

- Born: Julia Sun-Joo Lee; 1976 (age 49–50); Los Angeles, California, U.S.
- Education: Princeton University (BA); Harvard University (MA, PhD)
- Occupations: Writer; professor
- Writing career
- Pen name: Julia Sonneborn
- Subject: African-American literature
- Website: profjulialee.com

Julia Sun-Joo Lee (born 1976) is an American writer and professor of English at Loyola Marymount University. She studies African-American literature. Outside of academia, she has published a romance novel under a pen name.

== Early life and education ==
Lee was born to Korean immigrants in Los Angeles. She spoke no English before preschool, but once she was there she lost her Korean fluency. She grew up in Palms and attended an all-girls Catholic high school in the era of the killing of Latasha Harlins and the Rodney King riots. Her parents owned a Pioneer Chicken restaurant in Hawthorne that was damaged during the riots.

Following her graduation from Princeton in 1998, Lee briefly worked in management consulting. She attended graduate school at Harvard University, where she developed an interest in African-American literature and studied under Henry Louis Gates Jr. and Jamaica Kincaid. She received her PhD in English literature in 2008.

== Career ==
Lee's academic works "[challenge] the legacy of mostly white literary scholarship". The American Slave Narrative and the Victorian Novel (2010) examines the influence of slave narratives written in the United States on various works of British fiction, such as Charlotte Brontë's Jane Eyre, Thackeray's Pendennis, Elizabeth Gaskell's North and South, and Charles Dickens's Great Expectations. Our Gang (2015) follows the lives of the African-American child stars of the 1920s short film series Our Gang (or The Little Rascals) and considers the series's place in the country's racial history.

Lee was a postdoctoral fellow at the University of Southern California before joining the faculty of the University of Nevada, Las Vegas, in 2013. She became an associate professor at Loyola Marymount University in Los Angeles in 2017. Under the pen name Julia Sonneborn, she published a romance novel, By the Book (2018), inspired by Jane Austen's Persuasion. Biting the Hand (2023), a memoir by Lee, deals with Korean-American identity from her childhood to college years to professional life.

== Personal life ==
Lee lives with her two children and her husband.

== Published works ==
- Lee, Julia (April 9, 2010). The American Slave Narrative and the Victorian Novel. Oxford University Press. ISBN 978-0195390322.
- Lee, Julia (December 29, 2015). Our Gang: A Racial History of The Little Rascals. University of Minnesota Press. ISBN 978-0816698226.
- Sonneborn, Julia (February 6, 2018). By the Book. Gallery Books. ISBN 978-1501175183.
- Lee, Julia (April 18, 2023). Biting the Hand: Growing Up Asian in Black and White America. Henry Holt and Company. ISBN 978-1250824660.
