= Mary Taft =

British Wesleyan Methodist preacher

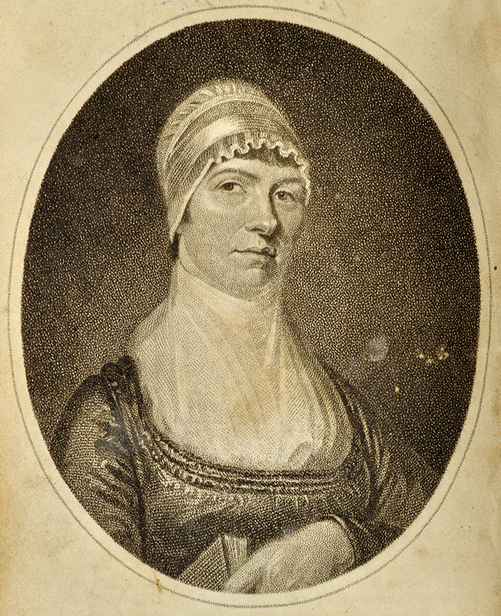
- Mrs Mary Taft by W.Holl (from a painting)
- Born: Mary Barritt; 12 August 1772; Colne, England
- Died: 26 March 1851 (aged 78); Sandiacre, England
- Known for: Methodist itinerant preacher
- Spouse: Zechariah Taft (m. 1802, died)
- Children: 2

Mary Taft (née Barritt; 12 August 1772 – 26 March 1851) was a British Wesleyan Methodist preacher. Her work was supported by many, including her husband, but in 1803, the Methodist conference objected. She took little notice. In 1799, she said that one day "the wonder will then be that the exertions of pious females to bring souls to Christ should ever have been opposed or obstructed."

== Life ==
Taft was born in Colne to John and Mary Barritt in 1772. Her mother was a Methodist; her father was not a Christian. The parents had seven children, five of them boys. One of the boys, John Barritt, became a preacher and he encouraged Mary in her ambitions, despite the senior John Barritt's objections. She spoke on his preaching circuit. By 1791 she was an enthusiastic Methodist who would attend prayer meetings. The superintendent minister objected to her exhortations but he backtracked when he witnessed the effects it was having. Her skills were recognised and she went on tours of the north of England and the Midlands. She converted people to Methodism and several Methodists to supporters of women preachers. She was invited to talk on different circuits although she was known for challenging complacent views.

In 1795 she went to the Methodist conference in Manchester. Joseph Benson, President of the Methodist Conference, was a vocal critic of women preachers and he spoke out against her work advising that circuits should not ask her to speak.

She went to the Methodist conference in Leeds in 1801. The following year she was not at the conference in Bristol, but she was mentioned. George Sykes reported that he was unsure of the number of converts in Grimsby as there were 530 when he left but he knew it would be more now as Mary Tate was there. It was in that year of 1802 that she married Zechariah Taft who was a fellow itinerant preacher and a vocal supporter of women ministers. They married on 17 August at Horncastle, Lincolnshire. In 1799 she said that one day "the wonder will then be that the exertions of pious females to bring souls to Christ should ever have been opposed or obstructed."

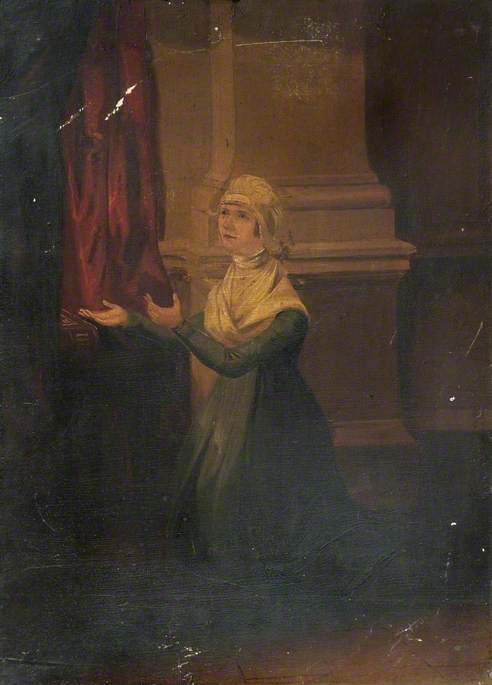
Mary Taft, after John Jackson

In 1803 Zechariah went to the Dover circuit. In June, Mary was preaching in the same month that their daughter was born and again in the following month. They hoped to work together in Dover, but the conference sent them to Epworth. The 1803 conference in Manchester decided that it would not allow women preachers and this was as a result of the work that she was doing.

The text said "[women should not preach]... 1. Because a vast majority of our people are opposed to it. 2. Because their preaching does not at all seem necessary, there being a sufficiency of preachers, whom God has accredited, to supply all the places in our connection with regular preaching. But if any woman among us think she has an extraordinary call from God to speak in public, (and we are sure it must be an extraordinary call that can authorize it,) we are of the opinion she should in general, address her own sex and those only: And upon this condition alone..."

Zechariah was at the conference and he would in time publish works in support of women preachers including Biographical Sketches of the Lives and Public Ministry of Various Holy Women in 1825–28. Meanwhile, Mary with the support of other preachers ignored the instruction, and continued preaching on the same circuit as her husband. Mary and Zechariah have been described as the powerhouse behind women preaching. Their contacts included Eliza Wilson in Yorkshire, Mary Holder and in Madeley Mary Fletcher and Mary Tooth. In 1827 her memoirs were published.

== Death and legacy ==
Taft died in Sandiacre near Derby in 1851. Zechariah had died before her. Notably the Methodist Magazine did not give her a standard essay-sized obituary but made only a short summary of her death that ignored many of her achievements. She was seen as an "important figure" in the "rebellion against traditional religious authority". Professor Deborah Valenze argues that the importance of her rebellion against discrimination created a focus for revision which had "universal significance". Birmingham Library holds an "Autobiographical preaching diary of Mary Taft, Methodist preacher, being an autobiography written for her children, Jane and Eliza Taft" which is thought to have been transcribed by Zechariah Taft in c. 1805–06.
