= Mary Fletcher (preacher) =

Early Methodist preacher (1739–1815)

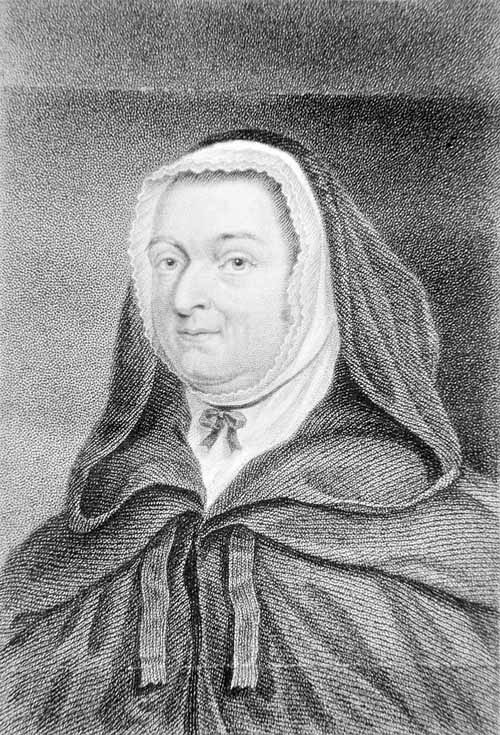
- Portrait of Mary Bosanquet Fletcher, created while she preached at Madeley
- Born: Mary Bosanquet; 12 September 1739; Leytonstone, Essex, England
- Died: 8 December 1815 (aged 76); Madeley, Shropshire
- Occupations: Class leader (c. 1763–1815); Preacher (c. 1763–1815); Philanthropist (1763–1815)
- Spouse: John Fletcher (m. 1781; died 1785)
- Relatives: Samuel Bosanquet (brother)

Ecclesiastical career
- Religion: Methodism

Mary Bosanquet Fletcher (née Bosanquet; /ˈboʊzənˌkɛt/; 12 September 1739 – 8 December 1815) was an English preacher credited with persuading John Wesley, a founder of Methodism, to allow women to preach in public. She was born into an affluent family, but after converting to Methodism, rejected its luxurious life. She was involved in charity work throughout her life, operating a school and orphanage until her marriage to John Fletcher. She and a friend, Sarah Crosby, began preaching and leading meetings at her orphanage and became the most popular female preachers of their time. Fletcher was known as a "Mother in Israel", a Methodist term of honour, for her work in spreading the denomination across England.

== Early life ==
Mary Bosanquet was born to Samuel Bosanquet and his wife Mary Dunster in September 1739 at Forest House, Leytonstone, Essex. At birth, it appeared that her tongue was fused to the inside of her mouth, and she almost died after it was separated.

Fletcher's family were Anglicans of Huguenot descent. Her father was lord of the manor in Leytonstone, as well as one of the chief merchants in London. Fletcher had an older sister and two younger brothers. Her brother Samuel became governor of the Bank of England and her sister married their cousin, Peter Gaussen. Fletcher grew up in a wealthy household, wearing fine clothing and holidaying in Bath and Scarborough.

=== Conversion ===
Fletcher was introduced to Methodism at about the age of seven, when a Methodist servant girl in the household began discussing religion with the two Bosanquet girls. However, the girl was dismissed when the parents objected.

The Foundery, in Moorfields, the first Methodist society Bosanquet attended

Through her father, Fletcher was confirmed as an Anglican at St Paul's Cathedral at the age of 13. However, Fletcher's older sister then introduced her to a member of the London Foundery Society, a Mrs Lefevre. This furthered Fletcher's interest in Methodism, and she began to reject her luxurious lifestyle. By the age of 16 she was refusing trips to the theatre or to spas and had begun to dress simply.

In 1757, Fletcher met Sarah Crosby, who at the time was a Methodist class leader. Meeting Crosby was the final impetus behind Fletcher's conversion to Methodism. She then dedicated her life to the Church and charity, rejecting her wealth and becoming active in the Foundery Society. She began to visit Sarah Crosby and Sarah Ryan in the Moorfields to learn more about the religion.

By 1760, tensions between Fletcher and her family had become pronounced. Fletcher rejected a marriage proposal from a rich young man, which angered her parents. Instead, she told them, she wanted to devote her life to serving God. This, along with her rejection of wealth and her parents' fear that she would convert her brothers to Methodism, led her family to ask her to leave. She moved into unfurnished accommodation in Hoxton Square, where she soon settled in company with Sarah Ryan.

== Charity work ==
=== The Cedars ===
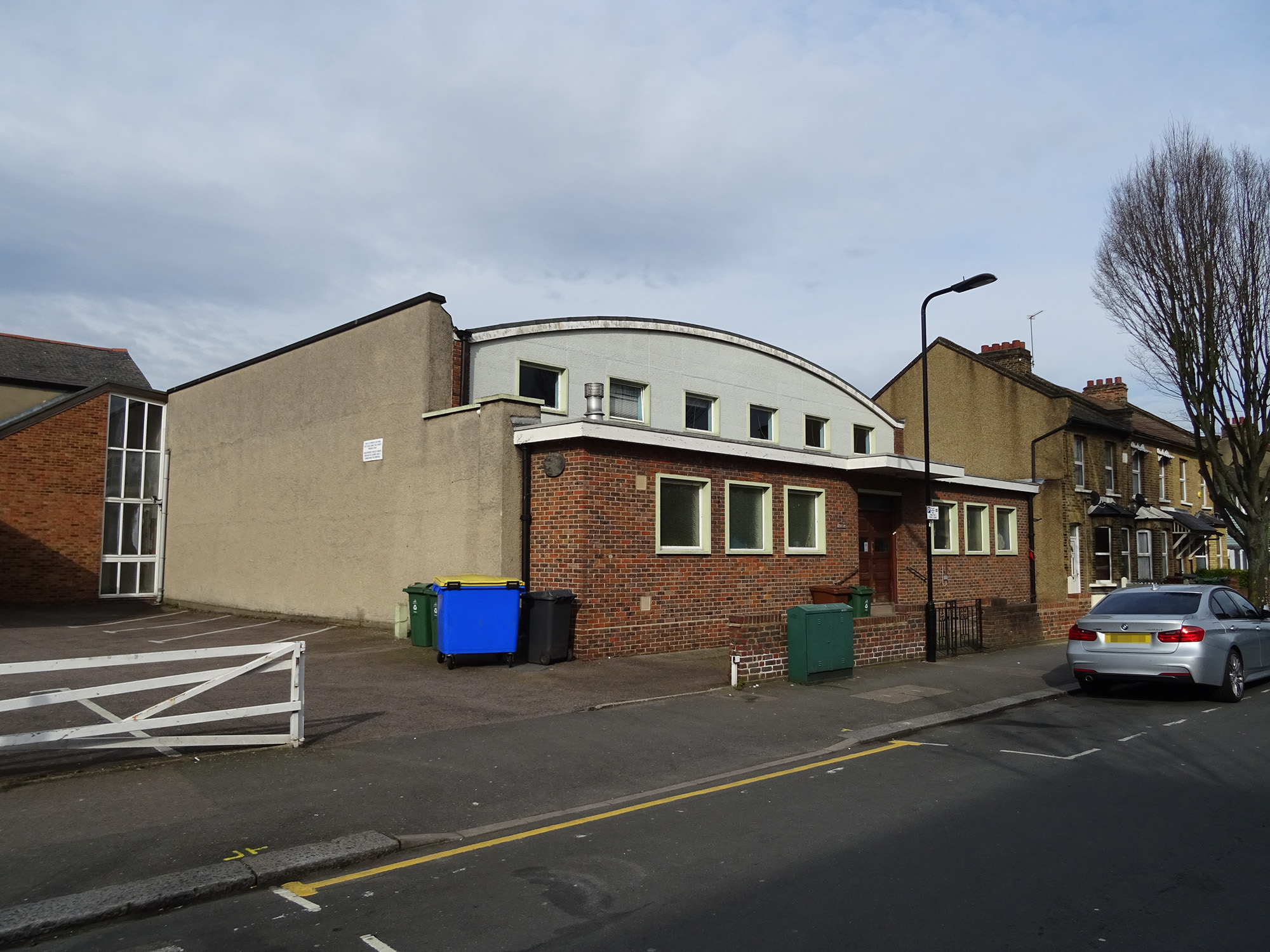
The site of The Cedars, now Leytonstone Methodist chapel

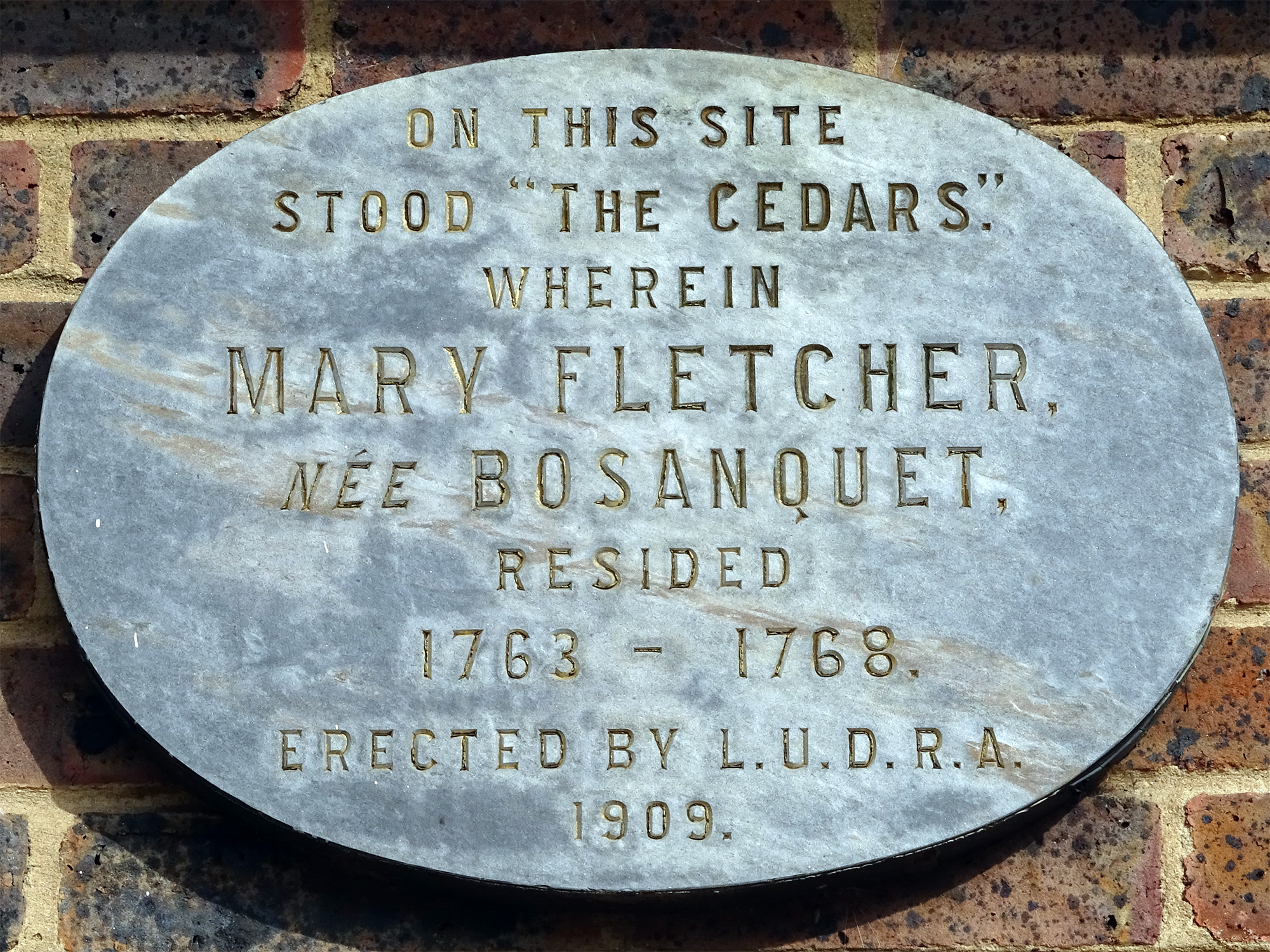
Plaque to The Cedars on the site where it once stood

Fletcher had something of a change of heart over her wealth in 1763; she decided to accept it, but use it for charitable purposes. On 24 March 1763, Fletcher and Sarah Ryan moved to one of the Fletcher family's properties, nicknamed The Cedars, in Leytonstone. She and Ryan felt they were called upon by God to help others. They hoped to establish an orphanage/school modelled on John Wesley's Kingswood School. Ryan had worked at Kingswood, and so provided the expertise Fletcher needed in order to set up a similar school. They hired a maid, and took in Ryan's orphaned niece, Sarah "Sally" Lawrence. As they took in more residents and Ryan's health declined, they hired Ann Tripp as a governess. Over time, other Methodist women joined Fletcher and Ryan in their efforts, including Sarah Crosby and Mary Clark.

The women at The Cedars took in members of the poor from London, including those who had strayed from God's path. Residents wore dark purple cotton uniforms and ate together. The children were taught manners, reading, religion, writing, nursing and domestic skills to prepare them for later life. They were punished harshly if they misbehaved.

Fletcher was not just the owner of the orphanage, but in charge of much of its operations. She would plan and lead worship, administer the finances, teach the children, conduct weekly children's meetings, act as a supervisor for Methodist meetings, and nurse the sick. She would invite sick women into The Cedars to be treated by her; some stayed after being healed to assist Fletcher in her efforts.

Bosanquet and Sarah Crosby instituted nightly Scriptural readings and prayer, as there was no Methodist society in Leytonstone. To improve the religious environment in the orphanage, the women asked John Wesley to supply them with a preacher. Wesley sent a Mr Murlin to preach, who evidently had success, as the orphanage soon became a Methodist society. Fletcher and Crosby continued to hold their own religious services on Thursday nights and began to attract large crowds. So successful were they that The Cedars became a centre of Methodism in Leytonstone. Though some Methodist men began to express opposition toward Fletcher and Crosby's activities, they were unable to stop them.

When Fletcher and Ryan first moved in, a crowd of villagers would throw dirt at anyone coming out of the house and yell at and spy on the residents. Fletcher was once told that four men would attend one of the Methodist meetings held at the home in order to break it up. The men came and Fletcher treated them kindly. She conducted the meeting as usual, and gave each of the men Methodist pamphlets at the end. The men reportedly took the pamphlets, bowed to Fletcher, and left peacefully.

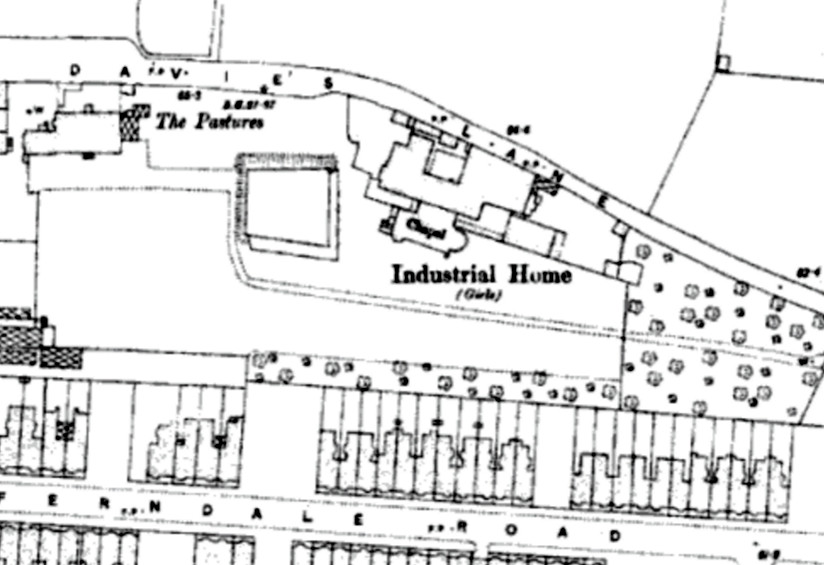
An 1895 map showing the location of 'The Pastures' (top left), formerly the site of The Cedars

Over the five years that the orphanage was in operation, it supported 35 children and 34 adults. There were usually 15 to 20 – mostly girls − staying at The Cedars at a time. The women's work at The Cedars was praised deeply by Wesley.

=== Cross Hall ===
In 1768, the school relocated to a farm named Cross Hall in Morley, Yorkshire. There Fletcher and Ryan began a new orphanage and took in 14 girls. The move from The Cedars to Cross Hall was made to decrease costs, as the women were to grow their own food, to give the children a more pleasant environment, and hopefully to improve Ryan's failing health. However, these ends were not accomplished. Fletcher and the other women had little to no experience of farm life, and growing their own food proved less than successful. Ryan died shortly after their arrival.

Fletcher met criticism for her work at Cross Hall. Some said her punishments of the children were too harsh, others that she was creating a convent, that her educating the children was futile since God was the bringer of success, and some even that she was simply wasting her time. Her family thought that she was wasting her inheritance. Despite these criticisms, however, Fletcher continued to operate Cross Hall until her marriage. It was then closed on 2 January 1782, but not before Fletcher had ensured that all the children in her care had been found new homes or an occupation.

=== Friendship with Sarah Ryan ===
While working together at The Cedars, Fletcher and Sarah Ryan became quite close, Ryan being like a mother to her. John Wesley acknowledged their bond, calling them, "twin souls". After Ryan's death in 1768, Fletcher fell into a depression, her only consolation being dreams she had of Ryan's survival. Fletcher's bond with Ryan was so strong that John Fletcher acknowledged Ryan as a part of their partnership during his marriage with Fletcher.

== Preaching and church work ==
While living and working at The Cedars, Fletcher, with Sarah Crosby, began to hold Methodist meetings at night. In the summer of 1771, Fletcher wrote to John Wesley to defend their work, now continuing at Cross Hall. This is seen as the first full and true defence of women's preaching in Methodism. Fletcher's argument was that women should be able to preach when they experienced an "extraordinary call", or when God asked them to. Wesley accepted the idea and formally began to allow women to preach in Methodism in 1771. However, it has been argued by the scholar Thomas M. Morrow that Wesley only allowed women to preach because they were successful in converting people. He did not have a change of heart, and did not allow women to preach in order to make any sort of statement, only as a technique for expanding his movement.

In February 1773, Fletcher went against Wesley's protocol for women preachers by referencing a text in her sermon. Though Wesley had supported women preaching in public after Fletcher's letter in 1771, he was still hesitant about allowing women to preach in the same ways as men. However, Wesley seemed impressed by her preaching style, and allowed her to continue. She was described as "a mother in Israel" – the title given in the Bible to the prophetess Deborah.

While Fletcher was daring and defensive when it came to her preaching, she was not entirely confident in it. In many of her diary entries and letters she expressed anxiety about leading worship. Fletcher was only able to continue with her work due to the support of her friends and fellow preachers. Her preaching attracted large numbers of people − in September 1776 she addressed a crowd of 2,000 in Golcar. Several times in her life, Fletcher's friends encouraged her to become a travelling preacher, due to her success and ability, but she did not take up the idea and found her passions to be more centred locally.

=== Marriage and ministry ===
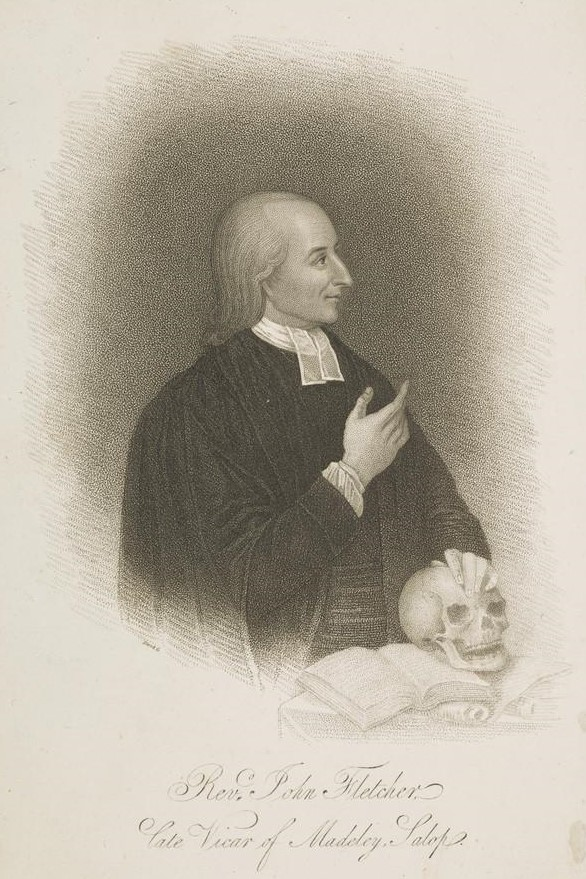
John Fletcher, Mary Fletcher's husband

John Fletcher and Mary Bosanquet first met in 1756 or 1757 at The Foundery. Fletcher was a Swiss-born clergyman who assisted John Wesley. At this time he considered proposing to Miss Bosanquet but decided against it, thinking she was too rich to accept and it would be better if he devoted himself to God.

In June 1781, Miss Bosanquet received a letter from John Fletcher, saying he admired her and had done so since they first met. They were married at Batley Church in Yorkshire on 12 November 1781.

She and Fletcher moved to Madeley, Shropshire, on 2 January 1782 and started a joint ministry there as what was considered the first "clergy couple" among the Methodists. Apparently, Madeley residents were enthralled by their preaching. Previous attempts to convert and preach to the residents had been unsuccessful. Not only did Fletcher preach, but she nursed the sick, met Methodist classes, and held Methodist meetings. She and Fletcher worked to run a school in Madeley, teaching religion, reading and writing. The marriage was short, however, as Fletcher died on 14 August 1785.

=== Later life ===
In 1785, Wesley attempted to persuade Fletcher to leave Madeley for a ministry with the Methodists in London. She refused, believing she was called to carry on her late husband's work in the parish. Fletcher continued to exercise some control over the local church hierarchy. Her husband's successor let her advise him on curate appointments. She was also allowed to continue living in the vicarage for the rest of her life. She continued to preach at Madeley and started to do so at the nearby villages of Coalbrookdale and Coalport. She continued to serve as a Methodist class leader for children and adults.

In 1793, Fletcher discovered a lump in her breast, which she tried to dissolve by praying and taking goosegrass juice as a herbal remedy. Nine months later, Fletcher claimed the method had worked and the lump disappeared. However, it reappeared some years later. Further remedies were tried to unknown effect, but Fletcher did have a lump in her breast upon her death.

In 1799 or 1800, Mary Tooth moved in with Fletcher, and Fletcher began to train Tooth as her successor. In 1803 the Methodist Conference decided that it no longer supported the idea of women preaching. Leading preacher Mary Taft who had caused the controversy took little notice. The Tafts were to stay with her for a week in 1810. They would have met Mary Tooth as she said that she was not parted from her "beloved" for 15 years for a period longer than 24 hours. Tooth took on some of her duties although Fletcher continued her work within the Wesleyan Methodist Connexion until shortly before she died. It was reported that in 1814, when she was 75 years old, that she still preached five times a week. Her last sermon was given on 25 July 1815, and three months before her death she ceased also to take religious meetings and hold classes.

== Death ==
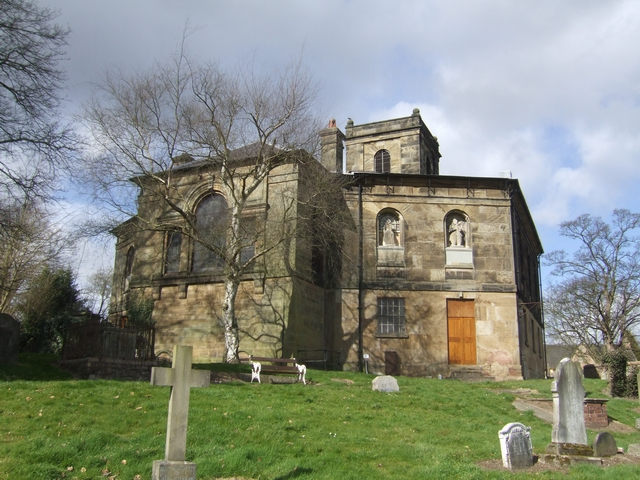
St Michael's Church, where Mary Fletcher was buried

Mary Fletcher died on 9 December 1815, and was buried at St Michael's Church, Madeley, in a shared grave with her husband. In her last days, she had been placed under the care of her friend and successor, Mary Tooth.

== Legacy ==
The Fletcher family held a prominent position at the church in Madeley for three generations. Reports have shown that the churches at Madeley were more popular than those in neighbouring regions even as late as 1851, 36 years after Fletcher's death.

Mary Fletcher's biography was republished in twenty editions in the 50 years after her death and Mary Tooth also wrote a 'Letter to the inhabitants of Madeley on the death of Mary Fletcher' in 1825. In addition she continued her work. Mary Fletcher's converts now had children and grandchildren and Tooth took on the role of being their spiritual guide. In May 1816 she had moved into a new home near the vicarage and in an upper room she created a public meeting place. She had the communion table from the church and a clock from Fletcher's old home and Madeley became a destination for modern pilgrims.

In 1895 Agnes Cotton opened a home for girls in Leytonstone. Cotton purchased what had been The Cedars. She renamed the house as The Pastures, and in time opened a larger home on the same site.

== Works ==
Fletcher published several evangelical pamphlets in her lifetime, addressed mainly to women. For example, Jesus, Altogether Lovely (1766) advises single women to remain faithful to Jesus. An Aunt's Advice to a Niece (1780) outlines further religious instruction for baptism and confirmation. Thoughts on Communion with Happy Spirits (1785) discusses the death of her husband, pondering whether he is still with her in a spiritual sense.

Fletcher published several of her letters in the Methodist Arminian Magazine. Though she did not personally write the work, she transcribed and preserved The Vision, an account of a religious dream. A transcript of one of Mary Fletcher's sermons was discovered recently. Dated 8 June 1794, the sermon was delivered in the vicarage at Madeley and speaks of being faithful and loving towards God.

Mary Tooth passed her autobiography to the Methodist biographer Henry Moore as she requested. Moore spliced the biography together with her letters and diary entries and published them as an anthology entitled The Life of Mrs. Mary Fletcher.

=== List of published works ===
==== Accounts ====
- Fletcher, Mary (1791). An Account of the Death of the Rev. Mr. Fletcher, Vicar of Madeley, in Shropshire.
- Fletcher, Mary (1808). An Account of the Death of Sarah Lawrence.

==== Autobiographical accounts ====
- Fletcher, Mary (1819). Moore, Henry (ed.). The Life of Mrs. Mary Fletcher. Philadelphia: Jonathan Pounder.

==== Letters ====
- Bosanquet, Mary (8 November 1764). A Letter to the Rev. Mr. John Wesley.
- Bosanquet, Mary (2 November 1770). A Letter, Written to Elizabeth A—ws, on Her Removal from England.
- Bosanquet, Mary (9 February 1777). Copy of a Letter to the Late Unfortunate Dr. Dodd, While, Under Sentence of Death, by Miss Mary Bosanquet, Afterwards Wife of the Late Rev. John Fletcher. ProQuest 137184788.
- Fletcher, Mary (18 August 1785). A Letter to the Revd. Mr Wesley.

==== Pamphlets ====
- Bosanquet, Mary (1780). Jesus, Altogether Lovely.
- Bosanquet, Mary (1780). An Aunt's Advice to a Niece.
- Fletcher, Mary (1785). "Thoughts on Communion with Happy Spirits". The Spiritual Magazine.

==== Sermons ====
- Fletcher, Mary (2010) [1794]. Wilson, D. R. (ed.). "A Sermon by Mary Fletcher (née Bosanquet), On Exodus 20, Preached at Madeley in the Parish Vicarage on the Evening of Whitsunday, 8 June 1794". Wesley and Methodist Studies. 2: 120–122. JSTOR 42909787.

==== Transcriptions ====
- Fletcher, Mary (2016). Cope, Rachel; Kime, Bradley (eds.). "'The Vision': A Dream Account Collected and Preserved by Mary Bosanquet Fletcher". Wesley and Methodist Studies. 8 (1): 52–66. doi:10.5325/weslmethstud.8.1.0052. JSTOR 10.5325/weslmethstud.8.1.0052. Published posthumously.
