= Mary Tooth =

British Methodist preacher

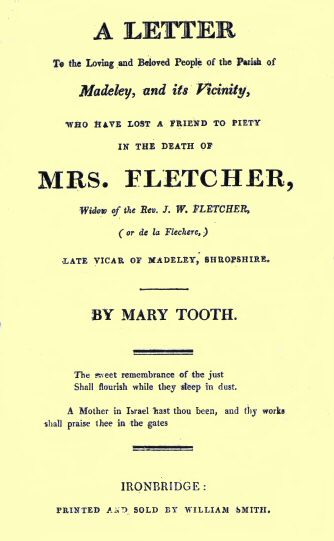
- Born: 30 May 1778; Moseley, England
- Died: 15 November 1843 (aged 65); Madeley, England
- Occupation: Methodist preacher
- Predecessor: Mary Fletcher (preacher)

Mary Tooth (30 May 1778 – 15 November 1843) was an early British Methodist preacher who practised long after women preachers were no longer encouraged by the Methodists.

== Life ==
Tooth was born in Moseley on 30 May 1778 to Mr and Mrs Tooth and baptised on 14 July at St Philip’s Parish Church in Birmingham. Her mother's name was Whittaker and she lived until 1803. Her grandparents were religious and they told her of their Christian faith. She had eight siblings but Mary and two of her sisters were to survive childhood.

At the end of 1795 she began work at Mrs Micklewright's school in Madeley as a teacher and in the following year she discovered the Methodists who had a society there. She soon declared that this was her interest for life. She became a close friend of the preacher Mary Fletcher.

In late 1799 or 1800, Tooth moved in with Mary Fletcher and Fletcher began to train Tooth as her successor. In 1803 the Methodist Conference decided that it no longer supported the idea of women preaching. Leading preacher Mary Taft who had caused the controversy took little notice.

Fletcher had discovered a lump in her breast several years before. Tooth said that she was not parted from her "beloved" Mary Fletcher for the next 15 years for a period longer than 24 hours. Tooth took on some of her duties although Fletcher continued her work within the Wesleyan Methodist Connexion until shortly before she died. It was reported that in 1814, when she was 75 years old, she still preached five times a week. Her last sermon was given on 25 July 1815, and three months before her death she ceased also to take religious meetings and hold classes.

Mary Tooth also wrote a Letter to the inhabitants of Madeley on the death of Mary Fletcher in 1825. In addition she continued Fletcher's work. Her original converts now had children and grandchildren and Tooth took on the role of being their spiritual guide. In May 1816 she moved into a new home near the vicarage and in an upper room she created a public meeting place. She moved in the communion table from the church and a clock from Fletcher's old home as Madeley became a destination for Methodist pilgrims.

Tooth took on a leading role writing many letters. She supported the Methodists and promoted the role of women within the church. She was still responsible for leading three classes when she died in Madeley in November 1843. Her biography was published in the same year.
