= John William Fletcher =

British Methodist cleric (1729–1785)

The Reverend John William Fletcher
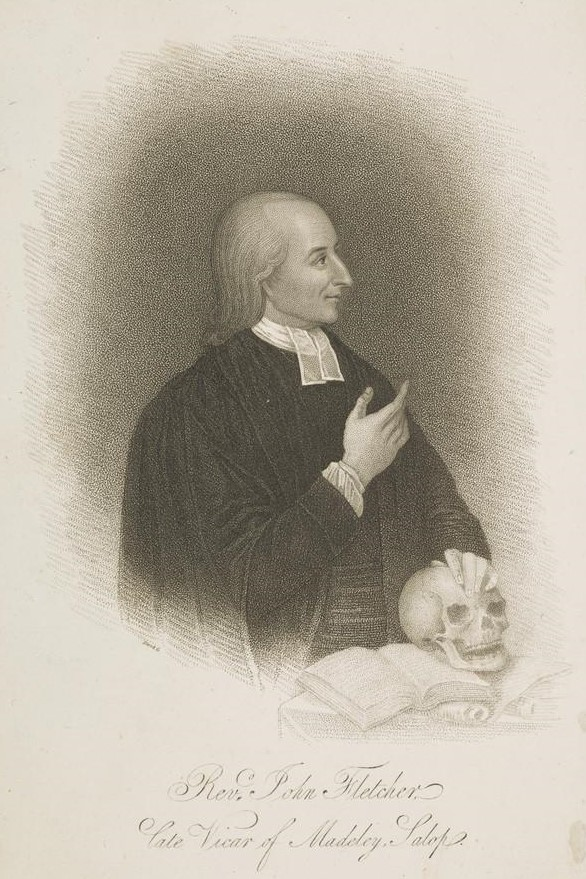
- Born: Jean Guillaume de la Fléchère; 12 September 1729; Nyon, Switzerland
- Died: 14 August 1785 (aged 55); Madeley, Shropshire
- Resting place: St. Michael's Churchyard, Madeley, Shropshire, England
- Education: University of Geneva
- Occupations: Priest of the Church of England, and theologian
- Years active: 1757–1785
- Employer: Church of England
- Known for: Vicar of Madeley, Shropshire; Theologian of the Methodist movement
- Title: Vicar of Madeley, Shropshire
- Predecessor: Rev. Rowland Chambre
- Successor: Rev. Henry Burton (Vicar); Rev. Melville Horne (Curate); Rev. Samuel Walter (Curate)
- Opponents: Sir Richard Hill; Joseph Priestley; Augustus Toplady; Walter Shirley
- Spouse: Mary Fletcher (née Bosanquet) (m. 1781)
- Website: www.thefletcherpage.org

John William Fletcher (born Jean Guillaume de la Fléchère; 12 September 1729 – 14 August 1785) was a Swiss-born English divine and Methodist leader. Of French Huguenot stock, he was born in Nyon in Vaud, Switzerland. Fletcher emigrated to England in 1750 and there he became an Anglican vicar. He began to work with John Wesley, becoming a key interpreter of Wesleyan theology in the 18th century and one of Methodism's first great theologians. Fletcher was renowned in Britain for his piety and generosity; when asked if he had any needs, he responded, "...I want nothing but more grace."

== Early life ==
Jean Guillaume de la Fléchère was born in 1729 and baptized on 19 September 1729 in Nyon. He was the eighth and last child of Jacques de la Fléchère, an army officer who was a member of the La Fléchère nobility, and Suzanne Elisabeth, née Crinsoz de Colombier.

He was educated at Geneva, but, preferring an army career to a clerical one, went to Lisbon and enlisted. An accident prevented his sailing with his regiment to Brazil, and after a visit to Flanders, where an uncle offered to secure a commission for him, he went to England in 1750. He had harboured a secret desire to travel to England, and had studied the English language prior to his arrival in London. In the autumn of 1751, he became tutor to the sons of Thomas and Susanna Hill, a wealthy Shropshire family, who spent part of the year in London. On one of the family's stays in London, Fletcher first heard of the Methodists and became personally acquainted with John and Charles Wesley, as well as his future wife, Mary Bosanquet.

== Ministry ==
In 1757 Fletcher was ordained as deacon (6 March 1757) and priest (13 March 1757) in the Church of England, after preaching his first sermon at Atcham being appointed curate to the Rev. Rowland Chambre in the parish of Madeley, Shropshire.

In addition to performing the duties of his curacy, he sometimes preached with John Wesley and assisted him with clerical duties in Wesley's London chapels. As a preacher in his own right, but also as one of Wesley's coadjutors, Fletcher became known as a fervent supporter of the Evangelical Revival. Fletcher perceived a vocational call from God to parochial ministry, and being led by this calling rather than by the temptation to wealth and influence, he refusing an offer to be presented to the wealthy living of Dunham in Cheshire, accepting instead the humble industrialising parish of Madeley in Shropshire. He had developed a sincere religious and social concern for the people of this populous part of the West Midlands where he had first served in the Christian ministry, and here, for twenty-five years (1760–1785), he lived and worked with unique devotion and zeal, described by his wife as his, "unexampled labours" in the epitaph she penned for his iron tomb. Fletcher was devoted to the Methodist concern for spiritual renewal and revival, and committed himself to the Wesleys by correspondence and by coming to their aid as a theologian, while maintaining a never-wavering commitment to the Church of England. Indeed, much of Fletcher's controversial theological writings claimed their foundation was the 39 Articles, the Book of Common Prayer, and the Homilies of the Church of England. Yet, for all his support of John Wesley's and his Methodist societies which in many cases came into tension with the parish clergy, Fletcher believed the Methodist model functioned best within the parochial system, and himself implemented his own brand of Methodism in his own parish.

John Wesley had chosen Fletcher to lead the Methodist movement upon Wesley's passing, but Fletcher died prior to Wesley.

== Marriage ==
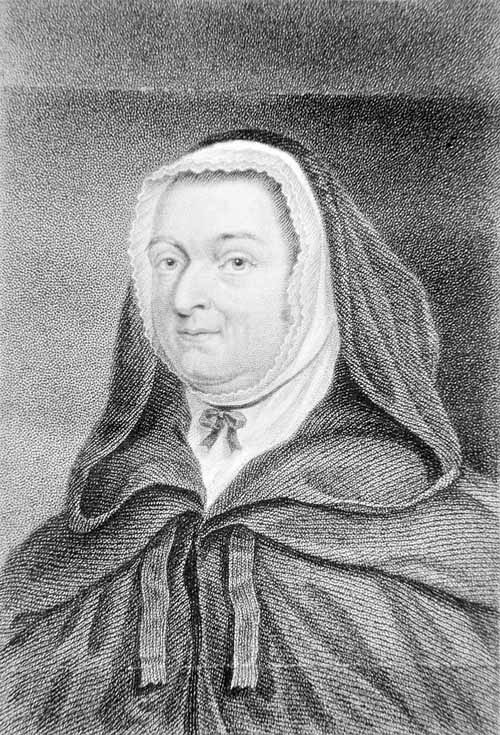
Mary Bosanquet Fletcher

In 1781, Fletcher returned from the Continent where he had been convalescing from a severe respiratory disorder. Upon his return he picked up a correspondence with a woman he had met nearly thirty years previous, Mary Bosanquet, who in the early 1770s had become one of the first woman preachers authorised by John Wesley to preach. Fletcher and Bosanquet first met during the mid-to-late 1770s at The Foundery. When they met, Fletcher had considered proposing to Bosanquet, but thought that she was too rich to accept his proposal, and that he would do better dedicating himself to God. Mr. Fletcher and Miss Bosanquet carried on a correspondence during June 1781, in which Fletcher confessed that he had admired her since they had met. Fletcher and Bosanquet were married at Batley Church in Yorkshire on 12 November 1781.

Fletcher exchanged pulpits with the evangelical vicar of Bradford, John Crosse, to settle his wife's affairs in Yorkshire. They returned to Madeley together on 2 January 1782. Their marriage was to be short-lived, for Fletcher died less than four years later, on 14 August 1785. After his death, Mary Fletcher was allowed to continue living in the vicarage by the new vicar, Henry Burton, a pluralist clergyman who was also the incumbent of Atcham parish, near Shrewsbury. Though John Wesley attempted to persuade Mrs. Fletcher to leave Madeley for a ministry with the Methodists in London, she refused, believing she was called to carry on her late husband's work in the parish. This she did for the next thirty years. She died in the parish and was buried in the same grave as her husband in December 1815.

== Theology ==
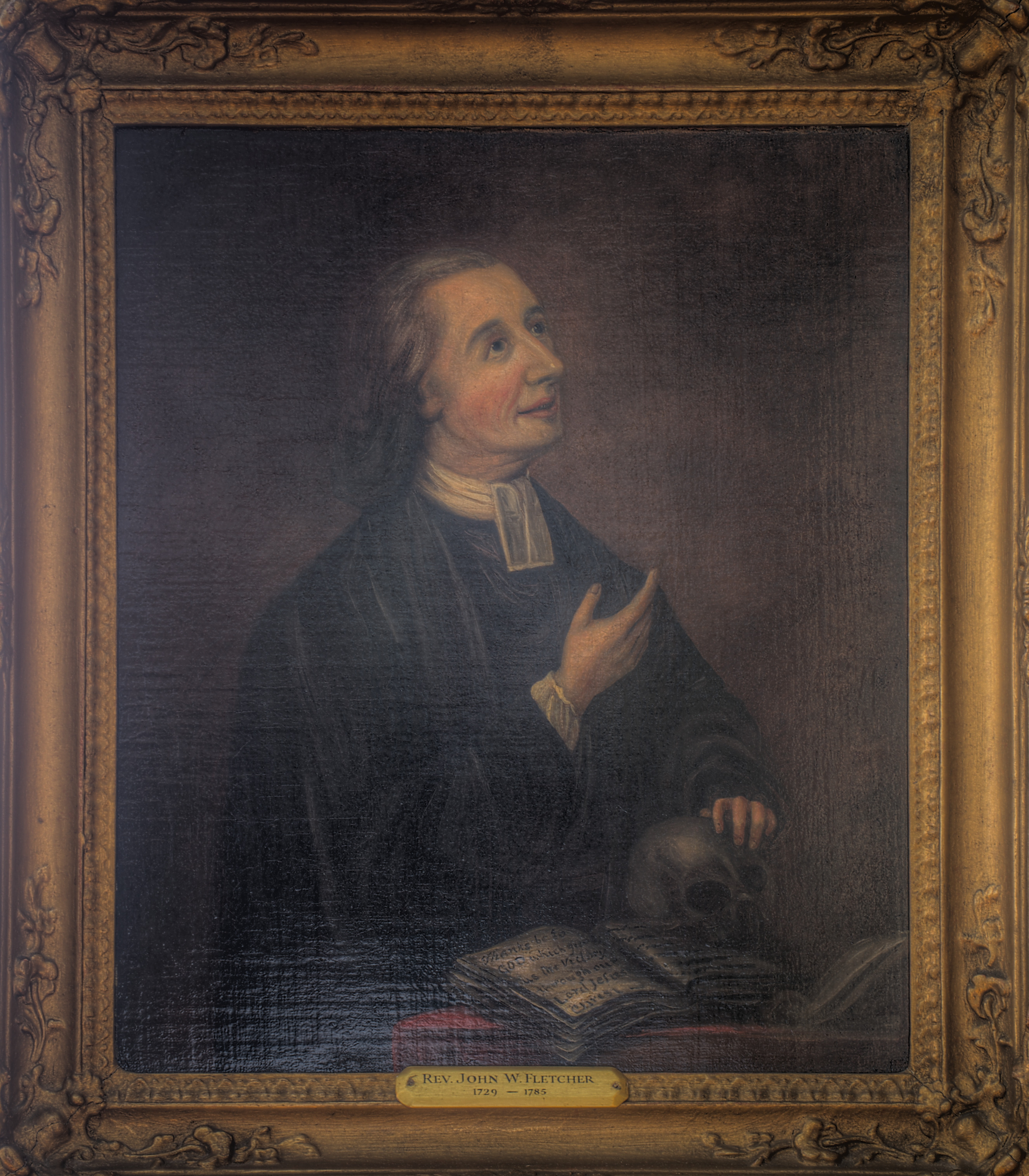
Painting of Fletcher on display at the World Methodist Museum, Lake Junaluska, NC

In theology he upheld the Arminian doctrines of unlimited atonement, free will, and conditional election against the Calvinist doctrines of unconditional election and limited atonement. His Arminian theology is most clearly outlined in his famous Checks to Antinomianism. He attempted to confront his (and John Wesley's) theological adversaries with courtesy and fairness, although some of his contemporaries judged him harshly for his writings. His resignation on doctrinal grounds of the superintendency (1768–1771) of the Countess of Huntingdon's college at Trevecca left no unpleasantness. Fletcher was characterised by saintly piety, rare devotion, and blamelessness of life, and the testimony of his contemporaries to his godliness is unanimous.

Although Fletcher's funeral sermon was preached by his friend Rev. Thomas Hatton, a like-minded clergyman from a neighbouring parish, Wesley wrote an elegiac sermon in the months after Fletcher's death, reflecting upon the text of Psalm 37:37, "Mark the perfect man". He characterised him as "unblamable a character in every respect", the holiest man he had ever met, or ever expected to meet, "this side of eternity". Southey said that, "no age ever provided a man of more fervent piety or more perfect charity, and no church ever possessed a more apostolic minister." His fame was not confined to his own country, for it is said that Voltaire, when challenged to produce a character as perfect as that of Christ, at once mentioned Fletcher of Madeley. There remains to date no complete edition of his Works, although varying editions of collections of his writings were first published after his death, first in 1795, with subsequent editions in 1806, 1822, 1836, 1859–60, 1873, and 1883 (among others, including a twentieth-century reprint by Schmul Publishers).

The chief of his published works, written against Calvinism, were his Five Checks to Antinomianism, Scripture Scales, and his pastoral theology, Portrait of St Paul. See lives by John Wesley (1786); Luke Tyerman (1882); F. W. Macdonald (1885); J. Maratt (1902); also J C Ryle, Christian Leaders of the 18th Century.

Most of Fletcher's theological publications date from the period between 1770 and 1778, when there was great conflict between Wesley and the Methodists and British Calvinists (although, much of the thought found in these treatises can be traced to the early days of his ministry as the Vicar of Madeley). When Wesley's Calvinist opponents made the charge that Wesley had endorsed works righteousness, Fletcher demonstrated that this was not the case. Rather, Fletcher countered that Wesley's language was an attempt to attack antinomianism in the British Church. Fletcher's subsequent publication Checks to Antinomianism supported Wesley further; this was the first distinctively Wesleyan theological writing published by someone other than John or Charles Wesley.

Fletcher often wrote about entire sanctification, which has been influential to the holiness movements in Methodism, as well as in the development of Pentecostal theology. John Wesley influenced, and was influenced by, the writings of Fletcher concerning perfection through the cleansing of the heart to be made perfect in love.

Fletcher became the chief systematiser of Methodist theology. Addressing Wesley's position on the sovereignty of God as it relates to human freedom, Fletcher developed a particular historical perspective espousing a series of three dispensations (time periods) in which God worked uniquely in creation. (This is not to be confused with Dispensational theology, which was fashioned long after Fletcher's death.) Through these dispensations, God's sovereignty was revealed not in terms of ultimate power but in terms of an unfathomable love. Fletcher sought to emphasise human freedom while connecting it firmly with God's grace.

== Writing style ==
Fletcher's writings, while serious in nature, display his keen wit, sometimes demonstrated by the use of clever satire. His typical form for constructing his arguments was a theological treatise written in epistolary fashion, though he used the literary convention of hypothetical Socratic "dialogues", as well as writing sermons and poetry, the most famous poem of which is his La Grace et la Nature. His Portrait of St. Paul, written in French, but translated and published posthumously, fit well within the genre of clerical training books of the period.

He typically wrote of God in terms of divine moral qualities rather than in terms of power or wrath. His themes were:

"1. Man is utterly dependent upon God's gift of salvation, which cannot be earned but only received; and

2. The Christian religion is of a personal and moral character involving ethical demands on man and implying both human ability and human responsibility."

Fletcher himself summarised his theological position:

The error of rigid Calvinists centers in the denial of that evangelical liberty, whereby all men, under various dispensations of grace, may without necessity choose life [...] And the error of rigid Arminians consists in not paying a cheerful homage to redeeming grace, for all the liberty and power which we have to choose life, and to work righteousness since the fall [...] To avoid these two extremes, we need only follow the Scripture-doctrine of free-will restored and assisted by free-grace.

Although the entire Methodist family uses Fletcher's work, his writings have found particular popularity among Holiness theologians.

== Works ==
Below is a selection of Fletcher's notable works :

- Fletcher, John W. (1771). A vindication of the Rev. Mr. Wesley's last minutes. Bristol: William Pine.
- Fletcher, John W. (1772). An appeal to matter of fact and common sense Or a rational demonstration of man's corrupt and lost estate. Bristol: William Pine.
- Fletcher, John W. (1772). A third check to Antinomianism. Bristol: William Pine.
- Fletcher, John W. (1772). Logica Genevensis : or, a fourth check to Antinomianism. Bristol: William Pine.
- Fletcher, John W. (1773). Logica Genevensis continued : Or the first part of the fifth check to antinomianism. Bristol: Printed by R. Hawes.
- Fletcher, John W. (1775). The fictitious and the genuine creed : being "A creed for Arminians,". London: Printed by R. Hawes.
- Fletcher, John W. (1775). A vindication of the Rev. Mr. Wesley's "Calm address to our American colonies". London: Printed, and sold at the Foundry.
- Fletcher, John W. (1775). The last check to Antinomianism. London: Printed by R. Hawes, and sold at the foundery, and by J. Buckland.
- Fletcher, John W. (1776). The Bible and the sword : or, the appointment of the general fast vindicated: in an address to the common people ... London: Printed by R. Hawes.
- Fletcher, John W. (1777). A reply to the principal arguments by which the Calvinists and the Fatalists support the doctrine of absolute necessity. London: Printed by R. Hawes.
- Fletcher, John W. (1833). The works of the Reverend John Fletcher (4 volumes). Vol. 1. New York: B. Waugh & T. Mason. ISBN 9780598538734.
- Fletcher, John W. (1833). The works of the Reverend John Fletcher (4 volumes). Vol. 2. New York: B. Waugh & T. Mason.
- Fletcher, John W. (1833). The works of the Reverend John Fletcher (4 volumes). Vol. 3. New York: B. Waugh & T. Mason. ISBN 9780598538710.
- Fletcher, John W. (1833). The works of the Reverend John Fletcher (4 volumes). Vol. 4. New York: B. Waugh & T. Mason.

== See also ==
- Divergence between Anglicanism and Methodism

== Notes and references ==
=== Sources ===
- Brown, Earl Kent (1983). Women of Mr. Wesley's Methodism. New York: Edwin Mellen. ISBN 978-0889465381.
- Chilcote, Paul Wesley (1993). She Offered Them Christ: The Legacy of Women Preachers in Early Methodism. Eugene, O.R.: Wipf and Stock. ISBN 1579106684.
- Coulton, Barbara (1989). A Shropshire Squire; Noel Hill, First Lord Berwick. Shrewsbury, England: Swan Hill Press, Shrewsbury. ISBN 1-85310-092-7.
- Dickins, Gordon (1987). An Illustrated Literary Guide to Shropshire. Shrewsbury: Shropshire Libraries. p. 31. ISBN 0-903802-37-6.
- Fletcher, John W. (1791). The Portrait of St Paul: or, the True Model for Christians and Pastors. Shrewsbury: Printed and sold by J. and W. Eddowes.
- Fletcher, John W. (1837). Checks to Antinomianism. New York: J. Collard.
- Flick, Stephen (2020). "John William Fletcher (1729-1785)". Christian Heritage Fellowship.
- Moore, H. (1817). The life of Mrs. Mary Fletcher, consort and relict of the Rev. John Fletcher (2 volumes). Birmingham: J. Peart & Son.
- Sangster, W. A. (1956). "Called to Be Saints". Proceedings of the Ninth World Methodist Conference. Nashville: Methodist Publishing House.
- Schaff, Phillip (1909). "FLETCHER, JOHN WILLIAM". The New Schaff-Herzog Encyclopedia of Religious Knowledge: Embracing Biblical, Historical. Vol. 4. New York: Funk and Wagnalls Company.
- Shipley, David Clarke (1942). Methodist Arminianism in the Theology of John Fletcher [Thesis Ph.D. diss.] [New Haven].
- Streiff, Patrick (23 September 2004). "Fletcher, John William [formerly Jean Guillaume de La Fléchère] (bap. 1729, d. 1785), Church of England clergyman and Methodist writer". Oxford Dictionary of National Biography. Vol. 1 (online ed.). Oxford: Oxford University Press. doi:10.1093/ref:odnb/9733. (Subscription, Wikipedia Library access or UK public library membership required.)
- Tyerman, Luke (2018) [1889]. Wesley's Designated Successor: The, Life, Letters and Literary Labors of the Rev. John William Fletcher. Franklin Classics. ISBN 978-0342798735.
- Wesley, John; Jackson, Thomas (1979). The Works of John Wesley (1872). Vol. 1. Kansas City, Mo: Beacon Hill’s.
- Wilson, D. R. (2009). "Thou Shal[t] Walk With Me in White: Afterlife and Vocation in the Ministry of Mary Bosanquet Fletcher". Wesley and Methodist Studies. 1. Center for Process Studies: 71–85.
- Wilson, David Robert (2010). Church and chapel : Parish ministry and Methodism in Madeley, c.1760-1785, with special reference to the ministry of John Fletcher. Manchester: University of Manchester.
