= List of Bible dictionaries =

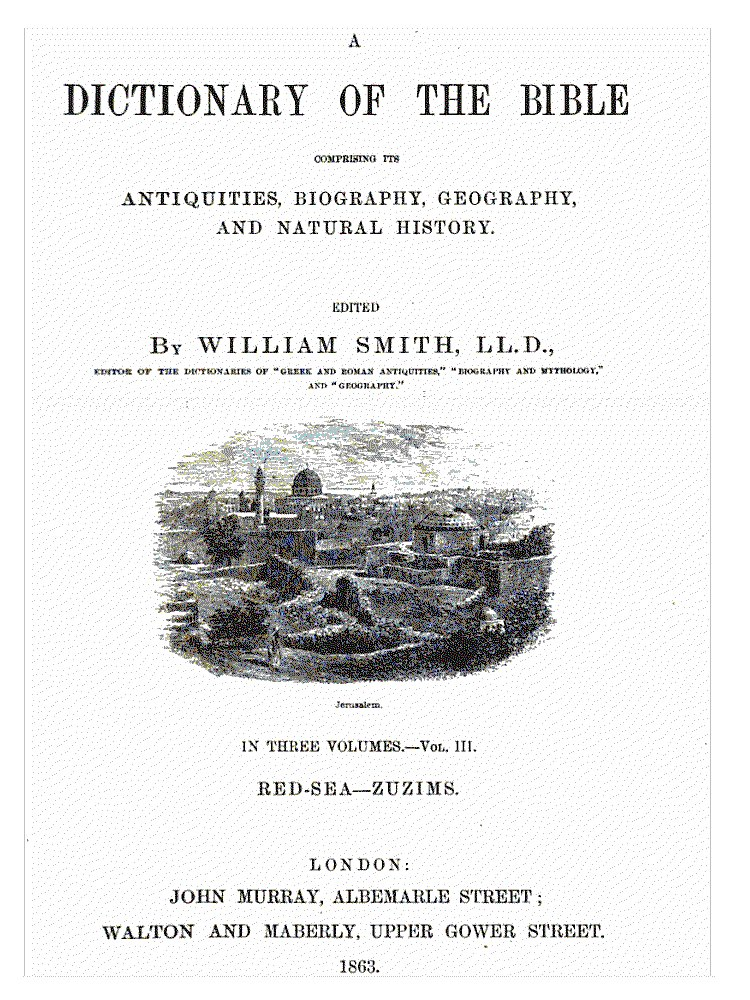
A Dictionary of the Bible (1863), edited by William Smith, title page for the third volume

A Bible dictionary is a reference work containing encyclopedic entries related to the Bible, typically concerning people, places, customs, doctrine and Biblical criticism. Bible dictionaries can be scholarly or popular in tone.

The first dictionary of the Bible in English was the Christian Dictionarie (1612) of Thomas Wilson.

== Bible dictionaries of the 18th century ==
18th century
Year	Title	Editor	Comments
1722	Dictionnaire historique, critique, chronologique, géographique et littéral de la Bible	Augustin Calmet	English translation (1732, 3 vols.) as An historical, critical, geographical, chronological and etymological dictionary of the Holy Bible, by John Colson and Samuel d'Oyly.
1769	A Dictionary of the Holy Bible	John Brown of Haddington	Welsh translation by James Rhys Jones as Geiriadur Beiblaidd, 1869–70.
1770	Vollständiges Biblisches Wörterbuch	Jacob Christof Beck	
1779	A Dictionary of the Bible	Alexander Macbean	
1784–5	Scripture Lexicon	Peter Oliver: might be Peter Oliver, or a Birmingham preacher of the same name according to James Darling, Cyclopaedia bibliographica.	
From 1797	Dictionary of the Bible, translation from Calmet	Anonymous, Charles Taylor	Later as Calmet's Dictionary of the Holy Bible, American edition enlarged by Edward Robinson.

== Bible dictionaries of the 19th century ==
19th century
Year	Title	Editor	Comments
1804	Dictionary of the Bible	James Wood	
1805–08	Geiriadur Ysgrythyrol	Thomas Charles	4 vols.
1810	Dictionary of the Holy Bible	Miles Martindale	2 vols.
1815	A Theological, Biblical, Ecclesiastical Dictionary	John Robinson	
1816	Biblical Cyclopædia	William Jones	
1817	The Diamond Pocket Dictionary of the Holy Bible	William Gurney	The 1829 American edition by Archibald Alexander comments that the book was found to be an abridgement of Brown's work; and Alexander made a fresh version. Welsh translation 1835 by Isaac Jones.
1831	Theological and Biblical Dictionary	Richard Watson	Based on conservative authorities.
1833	Dictionary of the Holy Bible	Edward Robinson	
1837	Complete Index and Concise Dictionary of the Holy Bible	John Barr	
1840	Biblical and Theological Dictionary	Samuel Green	
?–1843	The Bible Cyclopædia	William Goodhugh; William Cooke Taylor	2 vols.
1845	Cyclopaedia of Biblical Literature	John Kitto	2 vols. An abridged version was made by James Taylor, as the Popular Cyclopædia of Biblical Literature (1854).
1845–53	A Biblical Dictionary	James Austin Bastow	3 Vols.
1847	The People's Dictionary of the Bible	John Relly Beard	
1847	A Concise Dictionary of the Holy Bible	James Covel	
1848	Biblical Cyclopaedia	John Eadie	
1851	A Biblical and Theological Dictionary, illustrative of the Old and New Testament	John Farrar	
1854	A Bible Dictionary	Samuel Bulfinch Emmons	
1856	A Dictionary of the most important names, objects, and terms found in the Holy Scriptures	Howard Malcom	
1863	Smith's Bible Dictionary	William Smith	A Concise Dictionary of the Bible for the Use of Families and Students (1865) was abridged from this work by William Aldis Wright.
1864–83	Geiriadur Beiblaidd a Duwinyddol	John Jones	3 vols.
1866	Imperial Bible Dictionary	Patrick Fairbairn	
1866	Treasury of Bible Knowledge	John Ayre	
1867–81	Cyclopaedia of Biblical, Theological and Ecclesiastical Literature	James Strong and John McClintock	10 vols.
1867	Smith's Comprehensive Dictionary of the Bible	Samuel Weed Barnum	
1870	The Household Bible Dictionary	James Aitken Wylie	
1870	Beeton's Bible Dictionary	Samuel Orchart Beeton	
1871	A Bible dictionary for the use of all readers and students of the Holy Scriptures of the Old and New Testaments of the books of the Apocrypha	Charles Boutell	Reissued as Haydn's Bible Dictionary (1879), named for Joseph Timothy Haydn.
1885	Cursus Scripturæ Sacræ	Karl Josef Rudolph Cornely et al.	
1894	The Sunday School Teacher's Bible Manual	Robert Hunter	As Cassell's Concise Bible Dictionary (1901)
1894–1912	Dictionnaire de la Bible	Fulcran Vigouroux	
1897	Easton's Bible Dictionary	Matthew George Easton	
1898–1904	Hastings' Dictionary of the Bible	James Hastings	5 vols.
1899–1903	Encyclopaedia Biblica	Thomas Kelly Cheyne; J. Sutherland Black	4 vols.

== Bible dictionaries of the 20th century ==
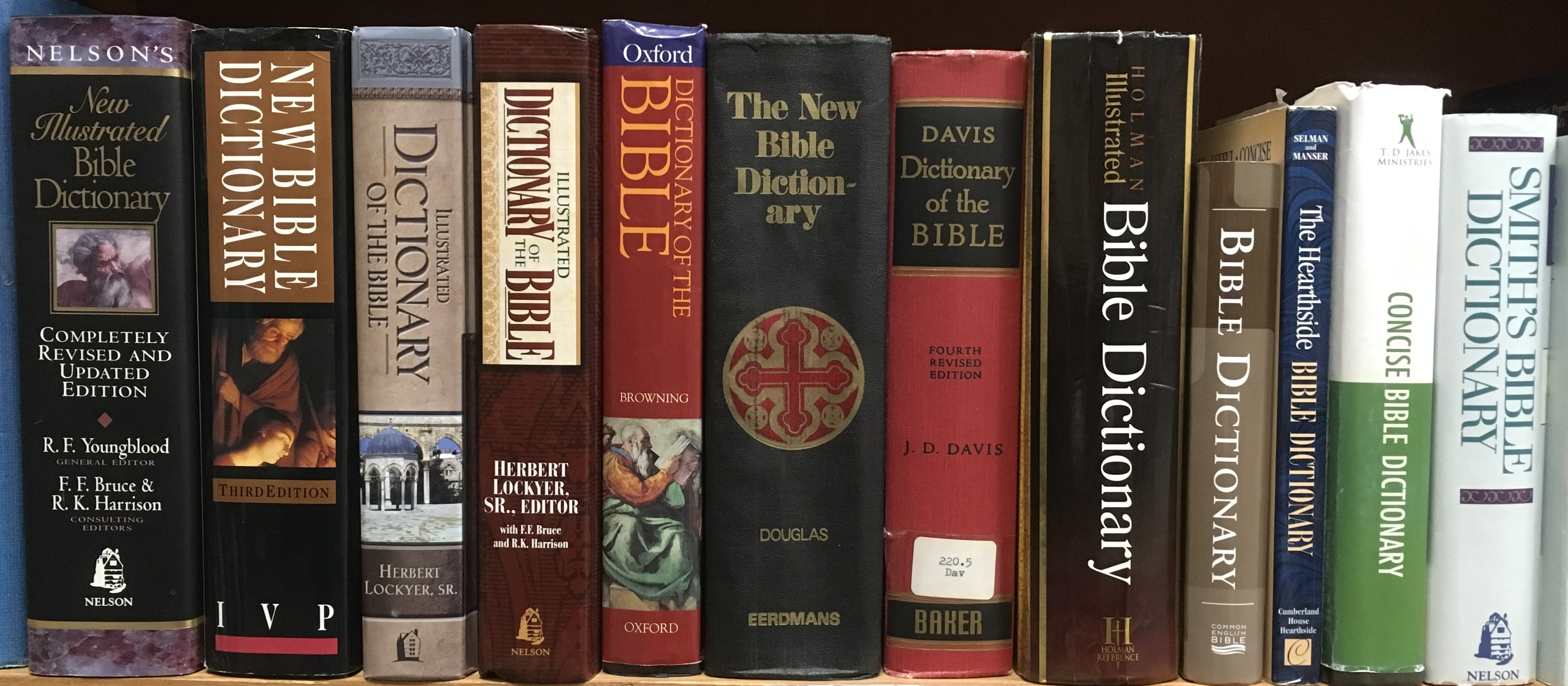
English Bible dictionaries

20th century
Year	Title	Editor	Comments
Barnes's Bible Encyclopedia, Biographical, Geographical, Historical and Doctrinal	1903	Charles Randall Barnes	
Standard Bible Dictionary	1909	Melancthon Williams Jacobus, Jr.	
Temple Dictionary of the Bible	1910	William Ewing and John Ebenezer Honeyman Thomson	
Universal Bible Dictionary	1914	Augustus Robert Buckland and Arthur Lukyn Williams	
International Standard Bible Encyclopedia	1915	James Orr	
A New Comprehensive Dictionary of the Bible	1922	Selah Merrill	
The Popular and Critical Bible Encyclopaedia and Scriptural Dictionary	1922	Samuel Fallows	
Theological Word Book of the Bible	1951	Alan Richardson	
Harper's Bible Dictionary	1952	Madeleine S. and J. Lane Miller	
The New Bible Dictionary	1962	J. D. Douglas	Second Edition 1982, Third Edition 1996
Dictionary of the Bible	1965	John L. McKenzie, SJ	
The New Westminster Dictionary of the Bible	1970	Henry Snyder Gehman	
LDS Bible Dictionary	1979		
Harper's Bible Dictionary	1985	Paul J. Achtemeier	
The Eerdmans Bible Dictionary	1987	Allen C. Myers	
Anchor Bible Dictionary	1992		
Oxford Dictionary of the Bible	1996	W. R. F. Browning	2nd Edition 2009

== Bible dictionaries of the 21st century ==
- New Interpreter's Dictionary of the Bible (2008)

== See also ==
- Bibliography of encyclopedias: religion
