= Bibliography of encyclopedias: religion =

This is a list of encyclopedias as well as encyclopedic and biographical dictionaries published on the subjects of religion and mythology in any language.

Entries are in the English language unless specifically stated as otherwise.

== General religion and mythology ==
- Annotated Dictionary of Modern Religious Movements. Grolier, 1993.
- Askmark, Ragnar, ed. (1952–1957). Nordisk teologisk uppslagsbok for kyrka och skola. Copenhagen: Munksgaard.
- Baumgartner, Anne. Ye Gods: A Dictionary of the Gods. Lyle Stuart, 1984.
- Benowitz, June Melby (1998). Encyclopedia of American women and religion. ABC-CLIO. ISBN 0-87436-887-1.
- Betz, Hans Dieter. Religion in Geschichte und Gegenwart: Handwörterbuch für Theologie und Religionswissenschaft. Mohr, 1998–2000. ISBN 3-16-146942-9.
- Betz, Hans Dieter. Religion past & present: Encyclopedia of theology and religion. Brill, 2007–2010. ISBN 90-04-14666-0.
- Bishop, Peter and Michael Barton. Encyclopedia of World Faiths: An Illustrated Survey of the World's Living Religions. Facts on File, 1988.
- Bowker, John Westerdale. The Oxford dictionary of world religions. Oxford University Press, 1997. ISBN 0-19-213965-7.
- Bradshaw, Paul F. The new Westminster dictionary of liturgy and worship. Westminster John Knox Press, 2002. ISBN 0-664-22655-8.
- Brandon, S. G. F., ed. (1970). Dictionary of Comparative Religion. New York: Scribner.
- Brasher, Brenda E. Encyclopedia of fundamentalism. Routledge, 2001. ISBN 0-415-92244-5.
- Buchberger, Michael, ed. (1957–1965). Lexicon fur Theologie und Kirche (in German). Freiburg: Herder.
- Carlyon, Richard. Guide to the Gods. Morrow, 1982.
- Cookson, Catharine. Encyclopedia of religious freedom. Routledge, 2003. ISBN 0-415-94181-4.
- Cotterell, Arthur. Dictionary of World Mythology. Putnam, 1980; Oxford University Press, 1990.
- Crim, Keith (ed.). Abingdon Dictionary of Living Religions. Nashville: Abingdon.
- Douglas, J. D. New 20th-Century Encyclopedia of Religious Knowledge. 2nd ed., Baker Book House, 1991.
- Eliade, Mircea. The Encyclopedia of Religion. Macmillan, 1986.
- Eliade, Mircea and Ioan Couliano. Eliade Guide to World Religions. HarperCollins, 1991.
- Encyclopedic Dictionary of Religion. Catholic University Press, 1979.
- Ferguson, John, ed. (1977). An Illustrated Encyclopedia of Mysticism and the Mystery Religions. London: Thames and Hudson.
- Funk & Wagnalls Standard Dictionary of Folklore, Mythology, and Legends. Funk & Wagnalls, 1949–1956.
- Galling, Kurt, ed. (1957–1965). Die Religion in Geschichte und Gegenwart. Tubingen: Mohr.
- Guiley, Rosemary, John Zaffis. The encyclopedia of demons and demonology. Facts On File/Checkmark Books, 2009. ISBN 978-0-8160-7314-6.
- Harris, Ian. Contemporary Religions: A World Guide, Longman, 1992.
- Harvey, Graham, Robert J. Wallis. Historical dictionary of shamanism. Scarecrow Press, 2007. ISBN 978-0-8108-5798-8.
- Hastings, James, ed. (1908–1927). Encyclopedia of Religion and Ethics. New York: Scribner.
- Herzog, Johann Jakob, ed. (1896–1913). Realencyklopadie fur protestantische Theologie und Kirche (in German). Leipzig: Hinrichs.
- Hetherington, Norriss S. Encyclopedia of Cosmology: Historical, Philosophical, and Scientific Foundations of Modern Cosmology. Garland, 1993.
- Hinnells, John. Handbook of Living Religions. Viking, 1985.
- Hinnels, John R. A new handbook of living religions. Blackwell, 1997. ISBN 0-631-18275-6.
- Hinnels, John R., ed. (1984). The Penguin Dictionary of Religions. London: Allen Lane.
- Jackson, S. M., ed. (1908–1912). New Schaff-Herzog encyclopedia of religious knowledge. New York: Funk & Wagnalls.
- Johnston, William M. Recent reference books in religion: A guide for students, scholars, researchers, buyers and readers. InterVarsity Press, 1996. ISBN 0-8308-1440-X.
- Jones, Lindsay. Encyclopedia of religion. Macmillan Reference USA, 2005. ISBN 0-02-865733-0.
- Jordan, Michael. Encyclopedia of Gods: Over 2500 Deities of the World. Facts on File, 1993.
- Keller, Rosemary Skinner, Rosemary Radford Ruether, Marie Cantlon (2006). Encyclopedia of Women and Religion in North America. Indiana University Press. ISBN 0-253-34685-1.
- Kennedy, Richard. International Dictionary of Religion: A Profusely Illustrated Guide to the Beliefs of the World. Crossroad, 1984.
- Krause, Gerhard and Gerhard Muller, ed. (1976–1985). Theologische Realenzykopadie (in German). Berlin and New York: W. de Gruyter.
- Landes, Richard Allen. Encyclopedia of millennialism and millennial movements. Routledge, 2000. ISBN 0-415-92246-1.
- Leach, Marjorie. Guide to the Gods. ABC-Clio, 1992.
- Loetscher, Lefferts A., ed. (1955). Twentieth Century Encyclopedia of Religious Knowledge. Grand Rapids, MI: Baker Book House.
- Lossky, Nicholas. Dictionary of the ecumenical movement. WCC Publications, c2002.
- Lurker, Manfred. Dictionary of Gods and Goddesses, Devils and Demons. Routledge, 1987.
- Marquis Who's Who. Who's who in religion. Marquis Who's Who, 1975/76-1992/93.
- Mead, Frank Spencer, ed. (1985). Handbook of Denominations in the United States. Nashville: Abingdon.
- Meagher, Paul Kevin; et al., eds. (1979). Encyclopedic Dictionary of Religion. Washington: Corpus Pubns. for Sisters of St. Joseph of Philadelphia.
- Melton, J. Gordon, ed. (1978). The Encyclopedia of American Religions. Wilmington, N.C.: McGrath.
- Melton, J. Gordon, Marin Baumann, David B. Barrett. Religions of the world: A comprehensive encyclopedia of beliefs and practices. ABC-CLIO, 2002. ISBN 1-57607-223-1.
- Mercatante, Anthony S. The Facts on File Encyclopedia of World Mythology and Legend. Facts on File, 1988.
- Parrinder, Edward Geoffrey, ed. (1981). Dictionary of Non-Christian Religions. Amersham, Bucks.: Hulton.
- Parrinder, Geoffrey. World Religions from Ancient History to the Present. Facts on File, 1984.
- Poupard, Paul, ed. (1984). Dictionnaire des religions (in French). Paris: Presses Universitaires de France.
- Pye, Michael. The Continuum dictionary of religion. Continuum, 1994. ISBN 0-8264-0639-4.
- Rice, Edward (1978). Eastern definitions. Garden City, N.Y.: Doubleday.
- Riggs, Thomas. Worldmark encyclopedia of religious practices. Thomson Gale, 2006. ISBN 0-7876-6611-4.
- Salamone, Frank A. Encyclopedia of religious rites, rituals, and festivals. Routledge, 2004. ISBN 0-415-94180-6.
- Schiele, Friedrich Michael (1909–1910). Die religion in geschichte und gegenwart (in German). Tübingen: Mohr.
- Schulman, Albert M. (1981). The Religious Heritage of America. New York: A. S. Barnes.
- Smith, Jonathan Z., William Scott Green, Jorunn Jacobsen Buckley. The HarperCollins dictionary of religion. HarperSanFrancisco, 1995. ISBN 0-06-067515-2.
- Snodgrass, Mary Ellen. Encyclopedia of world scriptures. McFarland, 2001. ISBN 0-7864-1005-1.
- Taylor, Patrick, Frederick Ivor Case, Sean Meighoo, Joyce Leung. The encyclopedia of Caribbean religions. University of Illinois Press, 2013. ISBN 978-0-252-03723-8.
- Viller, Marcel, Charles Baumgartner, André Rayez. Dictionnaire de spiritualité ascétique et mystique: Doctrine et histoire. G. Beauchesne et ses fils, 1937–1995.
- Young, Serinity, ed. (1998). Encyclopedia of women and world religion. Macmillan Reference USA. ISBN 0-02-864608-8.

=== Agnosticism and atheism ===
- Stein, Gordon (1985). The Encyclopedia of Unbelief. Prometheus Books.

=== Ancient Greek and Roman religion ===
- Bell, Robert. Dictionary of Classical Mythology: Symbols, Attributes & Associations. ABC-Clio, 1982.
- Boardman, John. Lexicon iconographicum mythologiae classicae (LIMC). Artemis, c1981–c1997. ISBN 3-7608-8751-1.
- Grimal, Pierre. Dictionary of Classical Mythology. Blackwell, 1986.
- Reid, Jane Davidson and Chris Rohman. The Oxford guide to classical mythology in the arts, 1300–1990s. Oxford University Press, 1993. ISBN 0-19-504998-5.

=== Baha'i Faith ===
- Adamson, Hugh C. Historical dictionary of the Bahá'í Faith. Scarecrow Press, 2006. ISBN 978-0-8108-5096-5.
- Smith, Peter. A concise encyclopedia of the Bahá'í faith. Oneworld, 2000. ISBN 1-85168-184-1.

=== Bible ===
- Achtemeier, Paul J. Harper's Bible Dictionary. HarperCollins, 1985.
- Achtemeier, Paul J., Roger S. Boraas. The HarperCollins Bible dictionary. HarperSanFrancisco, 1996. ISBN 0-06-060037-3.
- Allmen, Jean Jacques von, ed. (1958). A Companion to the Bible [Vocabulaire biblique]. New York: Oxford University Press.
- Baker Encyclopedia of the Bible. Baker Book House, 1988.
- Balz, Horst; Gerhard Schneider, eds. (1980–1983). Exegetisches Worterbuch zum Neuen Testament (in German). Stuttgart: Kohlhammer.
- Bauer, Johannes B., ed. (1981). Encyclopedia of Biblical Theology: The Complete Sacramentum Mundi. New York: Crossroad.
- Botterweck, G. Johannes; Helmer Ringgren, eds. (1974–1980). Theologisches Worterbuch zum Alten Testament [Theological Dictionary of the Old Testament]. Grand Rapids, MI: Wm. B. Eerdmans.
- Bridges, Ronald; Weigle, Luther A. (1960). The Bible Word Book Concerning Obsolete or Archaic Words in the King James Version of the Bible. New York: Nelson.
- Bromiley, Geoffrey W., ed. (1979–1982). The International Standard Bible Encyclopedia. Grand Rapids, MI: Eerdmans.
- Brown, Colin, ed. (1975–1982). The New International Dictionary of New Testament Theology [Theologisches Begriffslexicon zum Neuen Testament]. Exeter: Paternoster Pr.
- Brownrigg, Robert (1971). Who's Who in the New Testament.
- Buttrick, George Arthur, ed. (1962). The Interpreter's Dictionary of the Bible. New York: Abingdon.
- Cheyne, Thomas Kelly; J. S. Black, eds. (1899–1903). Encyclopedia Biblica. New York: Macmillan.
- Coggins, R. J., J. L. Houlden. A Dictionary of biblical interpretation. SCM Press; Trinity Press International, 1990. ISBN 0-334-00294-X.
- Comay, Joan (1971). Who's Who in the Old Testament.
- Corswant, Willy, ed. (1960). A Dictionary of Life in Bible Times [Dictionnaire d'archeologie biblique]. New York: Oxford University Press.
- Crim, Keith, ed. (1976). The interpreter's dictionary of the Bible: An illustrated encyclopedia identifying and explaining all proper names and significant terms and subjects in the Holy Scriptures, including the Apocrypha, with attention to archaeological discoveries and researches into the life and faith of ancient times: supplementary volume. Nashville: Abingdon.
- Deen, Edith (1955). All of the Women of the Bible. New York: Harper.
- Dheilly, Joseph (1964). Dictionnaire biblique (in French). Desclee.
- Douglas, J. D., ed. (1982). New Bible Dictionary (2nd. ed.). Wheaton, IL: Tyndale House.
- Ewing, W. The Temple dictionary of the Bible. Dutton, 1910.
- Freedman, Davie Noel. The Anchor Bible Dictionary. Doubleday, 1992.
- Gehman, Henry Snyder (1970). The New Westminster Dictionary of the Bible. Philadelphia: Westminster Pr.
- Genz, William. Dictionary of Bible and Religion. Abingdon, 1986.
- Harris, R. Laird, ed. (1980). Theological Wordbook of the New Testament. Chicago: Moody Pr.
- Hartman, Louis F. (1963). Encyclopedic Dictionary of the Bible [Bijbels woordenboek]. New York: McGraw-Hill.
- Hastings, James, ed. (1898–1904). Dictionary of the Bible. New York: Scribner.
- Hastings, James, ed. (1906–1908). Dictionary of Christ and his Gospels. New York: Scribner.
- Hastings, James (1963). Grant, Frederick C. and H. H. Rowley (ed.). Dictionary of the Bible (revised ed.). Scribner.
- Hastings, James, ed. (1916–1922). Dictionary of the Apostolic Church. New York: Scribner.
- Hayes, John Haralson. Dictionary of biblical interpretation. Abingdon Press, 1999. ISBN 0-687-05531-8.
- Holman Bible Dictionary. Holman, 1991.
- Illustrated Bible Dictionary. Tyndale House, 1980.
- Jacobus, Melanchthon Williams. A standard Bible dictionary.
- Jeffrey, David Lyle. A Dictionary of Biblical Tradition in English Literature. Eerdmans, 1992.
- Jenni, Ernst, ed. (1971–1976). Theologisches Handworterbuch zum Alten Testament (in German). Munchen: C. Kaiser.
- Kittel, Gerhard, ed. (1964–1976). Theological Dictionary of the New Testament [Theologisches Worterbuch zum Neuen Testament]. Grand Rapids, MI: Eerdmans.
- Klauck, Hans-Josef. Encyclopedia of the Bible and its reception. Walter de Gruyter, 2009–. ISBN 978-3-11-019904-8.
- Leon-Dufour, Xavier, ed. (1973). Dictionary of Biblical Theology [Vocabulaire de theologie biblique]. New York: Seabury Pr.
- Lockyear, Herbert, ed. (1958). All the Men of the Bible. Grand Rapids, MI: Zondervan.
- Lockyear, Herbert, ed. (1969). All the Trades and Occupations of the Bible. Grand Rapids, MI: Zondervan.
- McKenzie, John L., ed. (1965). Dictionary of the Bible. Milwaukee: Bruce.
- Metzger, Bruce and Michael D. Coogan. Oxford Companion to the Bible. Oxford University Press, 1993. ISBN 0-19-504645-5.
- Meyers, Allen. Eerdman's Bible Dictionary. Eerdmans, 1987.
- Miller, Madeleine Sweeny; J. Lane Miller, eds. (1973). Harper's Bible Dictionary (8th. ed.). New York: Harper & Row.
- Mills, Watson. Mercer Dictionary of the Bible. Mercer University Press, 1990.
- Moller-Christensen and Arne Unhjem (1965). Encyclopedia of Bible Creatures. Philadelphia: Fortress.
- Neusner, Jacob, William Scott Green.Dictionary of Judaism in the biblical period: 450 B.C.E. to 600 C.E. Macmillan Library Reference, 1996. ISBN 0-02-897292-9.
- The new interpreter's dictionary of the Bible. Abingdon Press, 2006–2007. ISBN 0-687-05427-3.
- New Unger's Bible Dictionary. rev. ed., Moody, 1988.
- Odelain, O.; R. Seguineau, eds. (1981). Dictionary of Proper Names and Places in the Bible [Dictionnaire des noms propres de la Bible]. New York: Doubleday.
- Osterloh, Edo; Hans Engalland, eds. (1959). Biblisch-theologisches Handworterbuch zur Lutherbibel und zu neueren Ubersetzungen (in German) (2nd. ed.). Gottingen: Vandenhoeck & Ruprecht.
- Packer, James I., ed. (1980). The Bible Almanac. Nashville, TN: Thomas Nelson. ISBN 9780840751621.
- Pfeiffer, Charles F. The Biblical world: A dictionary of Biblical archaeology. Baker Book House, [1966].
- Pfeiffer, Charles F.; Howard F. Vos; John Rea, eds. (1975). The Wycliffe Bible Encyclopedia. Chicago: Moody Pr.
- Reicke, Bo Ivar; Leonhard Rost, eds. (1962–1979). Biblisch-historisches Handworterbuch. Gottingen: Vandenhoeck & Ruprecht.
- Richards, Lawrence. Revell's Bible Dictionary. Revell, 1990.
- Richardson, Alan, ed. (1950). A Theological Word Book of the Bible. London: SCM Pr.
- Soulen, Richard N., ed. (1976). Handbook of Biblical Criticism. Atlanta: John Knox Press. ISBN 9780804200448.
- Steinmuller, John E.; Kathryn Sullivan, eds. (1956). Catholic Biblical Encyclopedia. New York: J. F. Wagner.
- Turner, Nicholas, ed. (1982). Handbook for Biblical Studies. Philadelphia: Westminster. ISBN 9780664244361.
- Vigouroux, Fulcran Gregoire; Louis Pirot, eds. (1907–1983). Dictionnaire de la Bible (in French). Paris: Letouzey.
- Who's Who in the Bible. New York: Bonanza. 1980. ISBN 9780517321706.
- Wood, D. R. W., I. Howard Marshall, J. D. Douglas. New Bible dictionary. InterVarsity Press, 1996. ISBN 0-8308-1439-6.
- Zohary, Michael (1982). Plants of the Bible. Cambridge: Cambridge University Press. ISBN 9780521249263.
- Zondervan Pictorial Encyclopedia of the Bible. Zondervan, 1974.

==== Biblical archaeology ====
- Avi-Yonah, Michael, ed. (1975–1978). Encyclopedia of Archaeological Excavations in the Holy Land [Entsiklopedyah la-hafrot arke'ologiyoi be-Erets Yisrael]. Englewood Cliffs, NJ: Prentice-Hall.
- Blaiklock, Edward M.; R. K. Harrison, eds. (1983). The New International Dictionary of Biblical Archaeology. Grand Rapids, MI: Regency Reference Library, Zondervan.
- Cabrol, Fernand, Henri Leclercq, Henri Marrou. Dictionnaire d'archéologie chrétienne et de liturgie. Letouzey et Ané, 1907–[1953].
- Negev, Avraham, ed. (1972). Archaeological Encyclopedia of the Holy Land. New York: Putnam's.
- Negev, Avraham, Shimon Gibson. Archaeological encyclopedia of the Holy Land. Continuum, 2001. ISBN 0-8264-1316-1.
- Pfeiffer, Charles F., ed. (1966). The Biblical World: A Dictionary of Biblical Archaeology. Grand Rapids, MI: Baker Book House.
- Stern, Ephraim. The New Encyclopedia of Archaeological Excavations in the Holy Land. rev. ed., Simon & Schuster, 1993.

=== Buddhism ===
- Buswell, Robert E. Encyclopedia of Buddhism. Macmillan Reference USA, 2004. ISBN 0-02-865718-7.
- A Dictionary of Buddhism. New York: Scribner's. 1972. ISBN 9780684127637.
- Fischer-Schreiber, Ingrid, Stephan Schuhmacher, Gert Woerner. The encyclopedia of Eastern philosophy and religion: Buddhism, Hinduism, Taoism, Zen. Shambhala, 1989. ISBN 0-87773-433-X.
- Geaves, Ron.Key words in Hinduism. Georgetown University Press, 2006. ISBN 1-58901-127-9.
- Muller, Charles A., William Edward Soothill (2001). Digital dictionary of Buddhism. Charles Muller.
- Humphreys, Christmas (1976). A Popular Dictionary of Buddhism. Totowa: Curzon Pr.
- Johnston, William M., Claire Renkin. Encyclopedia of monasticism. Fitzroy Dearborn, 2000. ISBN 1-57958-090-4.
- Keown, Damien, Stephen Hodge, Charles Jones. A dictionary of Buddhism. Oxford University Press, 2003. ISBN 0-19-860560-9.
- Keown, Damien, Charles S. Prebish. Encyclopedia of Buddhism. Routledge, 2007. ISBN 978-0-415-31414-5.
- Kohn, Michael H., Ingrid Fischer-Schreiber, Franz-Karl Ehrhard. The Shambhala dictionary of Buddhism and Zen. Shambhala, 1991. ISBN 0-87773-520-4.
- Malalasekera, G. P., ed. (1961–1979). Encyclopedia of Buddhism. Colombo: Govt. Pr.
- Olson, Carl, Charles S. Prebish. Historical dictionary of Buddhism. Scarecrow Press, 2009. ISBN 978-0-8108-5771-1.
- Prebish, Charles S. Historical dictionary of Buddhism. Scarecrow Press, 1993. ISBN 0-8108-2698-4.
- Senta, Nichiren Shoshu Kokusai. A Dictionary of Buddhist terms and concepts. Nichiren Shoshu International Center, 1983. ISBN 4-88872-014-2.
- Snelling, John. The Buddhist handbook: A complete guide to Buddhist schools, teaching, practice, and history. Inner Traditions, 1998. ISBN 0-89281-761-5.

==== Chinese Buddhism ====
- Hackmann, Heinrich Friedrich, ed. (1951–1954). Erklarendes Worterbuch zum chinesischen Buddhismus (in German). Leiden: Brill.
- Soothill, William Edward and Lewis Hodous (1937). A Dictionary of Chinese Buddhism Terms. London: Kegan Paul.

===== Zen Buddhism =====
- Baroni, Helen Josephine. The illustrated encyclopedia of Zen Buddhism. Rosen, 2002. ISBN 0-8239-2240-5.

==== Nichiren Buddhism ====
- Montgomery, Daniel B. Fire in the lotus : the dynamic Buddhism of Nichiren. Mandala, 1991. ISBN 1-85274-091-4.

=== Chinese religion ===
==== Chinese Buddhism ====
- Hackmann, Heinrich Friedrich, ed. (1951–1954). Erklarendes Worterbuch zum chinesischen Buddhismus (in German). Leiden: Brill.
- Soothill, William Edward and Lewis Hodous (1937). A Dictionary of Chinese Buddhism Terms. London: Kegan Paul.

===== Zen Buddhism =====
- Baroni, Helen Josephine. The illustrated encyclopedia of Zen Buddhism. Rosen, 2002. ISBN 0-8239-2240-5.
- Fischer-Schreiber, Ingrid, Stephan Schuhmacher, Gert Woerner. The encyclopedia of Eastern philosophy and religion: Buddhism, Hinduism, Taoism, Zen. Shambhala, 1989. ISBN 0-87773-433-X.

==== Confucianism ====
- Yao, Xinzhong. RoutledgeCurzon encyclopedia of Confucianism. Routledge, 2003. ISBN 0-7007-1199-6.

==== Taoism ====
- Fischer-Schreiber, Ingrid, Stephan Schuhmacher, Gert Woerner. The encyclopedia of Eastern philosophy and religion: Buddhism, Hinduism, Taoism, Zen. Shambhala, 1989. ISBN 0-87773-433-X.
- Fischer-Schreiber, Ingrid, Werner Wünsche. The Shambhala dictionary of Taoism. Shambhala, 1996. ISBN 1-57062-203-5.
- Pas, Julian F., Man Kam Leung. Historical dictionary of Taoism. Scarecrow Press, 1998. ISBN 0-8108-3369-7.

=== Christianity ===
- Anderson, Gerald H. (1999). Biographical Dictionary of Christian Missions. Wm. B. Eerdmans Publishing. ISBN 978-0-8028-4680-8.
- Barrett, David B., ed. (1982). World Christian Encyclopedia. Oxford: Oxford University Press.
- Baudrillart, Alfred; et al., eds. (1912–1983). Dictionnaire d'histoire et de geographie ecclesiastiques (in French). Paris: Letouzey.
- Bowden, John Stephen. Encyclopedia of Christianity. Oxford University Press, 2005. ISBN 978-0-19-522393-4.
- Brauer, Jerald C., ed. (1971). Westminster Dictionary of Church History. Philadelphia: Westminster.
- Brunotte, Heinz; Otto Weber, eds. (1955–1961). Evangelisches Kirchenlexicon (in German). Gottingen: Vandenhoeck & Ruprecht.
- Cabrol, Fernand; Henri Leclerq, eds. (1907–1953). Dictionnaire d'archeologie chretienne et de liturgie. Paris: Letouzey.
- Clifton, Chas. S. Encyclopedia of Heresies and Heretics. ABC-Clio, 1992.
- Cross, F. L.; E. A. Livingstone, eds. (1974). The Oxford Dictionary of the Christian Church. London: Oxford University Press. ISBN 978-0-19-211545-4.
- Davies, John Gordon, ed. (1972). A Dictionary of Liturgy and Worship. New York: Macmillan.
- Day, Peter D. A dictionary of Christian denominations. Continuum, 2003. ISBN 0-8264-5745-2.
- Dictionnaire de spiritualite (in French). Paris: Beauchesne. 1932–1984.
- Döpp, Siegmar, Wilhelm Geerlings, Matthew O'Connell. Dictionary of early Christian literature. Crossroad, 2000. ISBN 978-0-8245-2800-3.
- Douglas, James Dixon, ed. (1978). The New International Dictionary of the Christian Church (Rev. ed.). Exeter: Paternoster.
- Evans, Craig A. Encyclopedia of the historical Jesus. Routledge, [2008]. ISBN 978-0-415-97569-8.
- Geaves, Ron. Key words in Christianity. Georgetown University Press, 2006. ISBN 1-58901-126-0.
- Harrington, Daniel J. Historical dictionary of Jesus. Scarecrow Press, 2010. ISBN 978-0-8108-7667-5.
- Harvey, Van Austin, ed. (1964). A Handbook of Theological Terms. New York: Macmillan.
- Henry, Carl F. H., ed. (1973). Baker's Dictionary of Christian Ethics. Grand Rapids, MI: Baker Book House.
- Johnston, William M., Claire Renkin. Encyclopedia of monasticism. Fitzroy Dearborn, 2000. ISBN 1-57958-090-4.
- Klauser, Theodor, Franz Joseph Dölger, Hans Lietzmann. Reallexikon für Antike und Christentum: Sachwörterbuch zur Auseinandersetzung des Christentums mit der antiken Welt. Hiersemann, 1950–2007.
- Klenicki, Leon, Geoffrey Wigoder. A dictionary of the Jewish-Christian dialogue. Paulist Press, c1995. ISBN 0-8091-3582-5.
- Komonchak, Joseph. New Dictionary of Theology. Michael Glazier, 1987.
- Kurian, George (8 March 2010). Encyclopedia of Christian Civilization, 4 Volume Set. John Wiley & Sons. p. 2037. ISBN 978-1-4051-5762-9.
- Kurian, George Thomas (1 July 2010). The Encyclopedia of Christian Literature. Scarecrow Press. ISBN 978-0-8108-6987-5.
- Livingston, Elizabeth A., ed. (1977). The Concise Oxford Dictionary of the Christian Church. New York: Oxford University Press.
- Macquarrie, John, ed. (1967). Dictionary of Christian Ethics. Philadelphia: Westminster.
- Malloch, James M., ed. (1964). A Practical Church Dictionary. New York: Morehouse-Barlow.
- Metford, J. C. J., ed. (1983). Dictionary of Christian Lore and Legend. London: Thames and Hudson. ISBN 9780500110201.
- Moreau, A. Scott, Harold A. Netland, Charles Edward van Engen. Evangelical dictionary of world missions. Baker Books; Paternoster Press, 2000. ISBN 0-8010-2074-3.
- O'Brien, Thomas C., ed. (1958). Corpus Dictionary of Western Churches. Washington: Corpus Publs.
- Okumene Lexikon (in German). Frankfurt-am-Main: Lembeck, Knecht. 1983.
- Parry, Kenneth, John F. Hinnells. The Blackwell dictionary of Eastern Christianity. Blackwell, [2000]. ISBN 0-631-18966-1.
- Purvis, John Stanley, ed. (1962). Dictionary of Ecclesiastical Terms. London: Nelson.
- Rahner, Karl, ed. (1975). Encyclopedia of Theology: The Concise Sacramentum Mundi. New York: Seabury Pr.
- Reallexikon fur Antike und Christentum (in German). Stuttgart: Hiersemann. 1950–1984.
- Reid, Daniel G. Dictionary of Christianity in America: A Comprehensive Resource on the Religious Impulse That Shaped a Continent. Intervarsity, 1990.
- Richardson, Alan; John Bowden, eds. (1983). A New Dictionary of Christian Theology. London: SCM Pr.
- Smith, William; Samuel Cheetham, eds. (1875–1880). Dictionary of Christian Antiquities. London: Murray.
- Smith, William; Henry Wace, eds. (1877–1887). Dictionary of Christian Biography, Literature, Sects, and Doctrines. London: Murray.
- Tiedemann, R. G. Reference guide to Christian missionary societies in China: From the sixteenth to the twentieth century. M.E. Sharpe, 2009. ISBN 978-0-7656-1808-5.
- Tischler, Nancy M. (2006), All things in the Bible: an encyclopedia of the biblical world, Greenwood Publishing, Westport, Conn. 2 vols, 808 pages. ISBN 978-0-313-33082-7. Also available as free ebook.
- Wace, Henry; William C. Piercy, eds. (1911). Dictionary of Christian Biography and Literature to the End of the Sixth Century A.D. London: Murray.
- Wakefield, Thomas C., ed. (1983). A Dictionary of Christian Spirituality. London: SCM Pr.
- White, Richard Clark, ed. (1960). The Vocabulary of the Church: A Pronunciation Guide. New York: Macmillan.

==== Christian art ====
- Giorgi, Rosa, Stefano Zuffi. Saints in art. J. Paul Getty Museum, 2003. ISBN 0-89236-717-2.
- Rochelle, Mercedes. Post-Biblical saints art index: A locator of paintings, sculptures, mosaics, icons, frescoes, manuscript illuminations, sketches, woodcuts, and engravings, created from the 4th century to 1950, with a directory of the institutions holding them. McFarland, 1994. ISBN 0-89950-942-8.
- Sill, Gertrude Grace. Handbook of Symbols in Christian Art. Macmillan, 1975.
- Speake, Jennifer. The Dent dictionary of symbols in Christian art. J. M. Dent, 1994. ISBN 0-460-86138-7.

==== Biography ====
- Anderson, Gerald H. Biographical dictionary of Christian missions. Macmillan Reference USA, 1998. ISBN 0-02-864604-5.
- Biographisch-bibliographisches Kirchenlexicon. Hamm, Westfalia: Verlag Traugott Bautz. 1975–1978.. Also available online here.
- Biographical dictionary of Chinese Christianity. Overseas Ministries Study Center, 2006–. Available online here.
- Bowden, Henry Warner, ed. (1977). Dictionary of American Religious Biography. Westport, CT: Greenwood Pr. ISBN 9780837189062.
- Carey, Patrick W., Joseph T. Lienhard. Biographical dictionary of Christian theologians. Greenwood Press, 2000. ISBN 0-313-29649-9.
- Haag, Eugene; Emile Haag, eds. (1846–1859). La France protestante (in French). Paris: Cherbuliez.
- Larsen, Timothy, D. W. Bebbington, Mark A. Noll. Biographical dictionary of evangelicals. InterVarsity Press, 2003. ISBN 0-8308-2925-3.
- Moyer, Elgin Sylvester, ed. (1982). Wycliffe Biographical Dictionary of the Church (Revised ed.). Chicago: Moody Press.
- Musser, Donald W., Joseph L. Price. A new handbook of Christian theologians. Abingdon Press, 1996. ISBN 0-687-27803-1.
- Overseas Ministries Study Center. The dictionary of African Christian biography. Overseas Ministries Study Center, 2002–. Available online here.
- Sprague, William Buell, ed. (1857–1869). Annals of the American Pulpit. New York: R. Carter.
- Weis, Frederick Lewis (1936). The Colonial Clergy and the Colonial Churches of New England. Lancaster, MA.
- Weis, Frederick Lewis (1950). The Colonial Clergy of Maryland, Delaware and Georgia. Lancaster, MA.
- Weis, Frederick Lewis (1957). The Colonial Clergy of the Middle Colonies. Worcester, MA: Amer. Antiquarian Soc.
- Weis, Frederick Lewis (1955). The Colonial Clergy of Virginia, North Carolina and South Carolina. Boston, MA.
- Who's Who in Religion (2nd. ed.). Chicago: Marquis. 1977.
- Williams, Ethel I. (1975). Biographical Dictionary of Negro Ministers (Third ed.). Boston: G. K. Hall.

===== Saints =====
- Acta sanctorum quotquot toto orbe coluntur (in Latin). Paris: Editio novissima curante Joanne Carnandet. 1863–1940.
- Attwater, Donald (1958). A Dictionary of Saints: Based on Butler's Lives of the Saints. New York: Kenedy.
- Attwater, Donald (1983). The Penguin Dictionary of Saints (Second ed.). Harmondsworth, Eng. and New York: Penguin. ISBN 9780140511239.
- Baring-Gould, Sabine (1914). The Lives of the Saints. Edinburgh: Grant.
- Bibliotheca Sanctorum (in Italian). Rome: Instituto Giovanni XXIII nella Pontifica Universita Laterense. 1961–1970.
- Benedictine monks of St. Augustine's Abbey, Ramsgate, ed. (1966). Book of Saints (Fifth ed.). London: A. & C. Black.
- Butler, Alban (1926–1938). Lives of the Saints (New ed.). London: Burns.
- Butler, Alban (1956). Lives of the Saints (Complete. ed.). New York: Kenedy.
- Butler, Alban, Paul Burns. Butler's lives of the saints: Supplement of new saints and blesseds. Liturgical Press, 2005–. ISBN 0-8146-1837-5.
- Butler, Alban, David Hugh Farmer, Paul Burns. Butler's lives of the saints. Burns & Oates; Liturgical Press, 1995–2000. ISBN 0-8146-2377-8.
- Coulson, John, ed. (1958). The Saints: A Concise Biographical Dictionary. London: Burns.
- Delaney, John J. (1980). Dictionary of Saints. Garden City, NY: Doubleday. ISBN 9780385135948.
- Farmer, David Hugh (1978). The Oxford Dictionary of Saints. Oxford: Clarendon Pr. ISBN 978-0-19-869120-4.
- Giorgi, Rosa, Stefano Zuffi. Saints in art. J. Paul Getty Museum, 2003. ISBN 0-89236-717-2.
- Guiley, Rosemary. The encyclopedia of saints. Facts on File, 2001. ISBN 0-8160-4133-4.
- Ó Riain, Pádraig. A dictionary of Irish saints. Four Courts Press, c2011.
- Speake, Jennifer. The Dent dictionary of symbols in Christian art. J. M. Dent, 1994. ISBN 0-460-86138-7.

==== Christian history ====
- Di Bernardino, Angelo. Encyclopedia of the Early Church. Oxford University Press, 1992.
- Ferguson, Everett, Michael P. McHugh, Frederick W. Norris. Encyclopedia of early Christianity. Garland, 1998. ISBN 0-8153-3319-6.
- Hillerbrand, Hans Joachim. The Oxford encyclopedia of the Reformation. Oxford University Press, 1996. ISBN 0-19-506493-3.
- Jouanna, Arlette. Histoire et dictionnaire des guerres de religion. R. Laffont, 1998. ISBN 2-221-07425-4.
- Ollard, S. L., Gordon Crosse, Maurice Francis Bond. A dictionary of English church history. A.R. Mowbray; Morehouse-Gorham, [1948].

==== Christian liturgy and worship ====
- Bradshaw, Paul F. The new Westminster dictionary of liturgy and worship. Westminster John Knox Press, 2002. ISBN 0-664-22655-8.
- Pfatteicher, Philip H. A dictionary of liturgical terms. Trinity Press International, 1991. ISBN 1-56338-026-9.

===== Roman Catholic liturgy and worship =====
- Fink, Peter E. The new dictionary of sacramental worship. Liturgical Press, 1990. ISBN 0-8146-5788-5.
- Lang, Jovian. Dictionary of the liturgy. Catholic Book, 1989. ISBN 0-89942-273-X.

==== Christian philosophy and theology ====
- Carey, Patrick W., Joseph T. Lienhard. Biographical dictionary of Christian theologians. Greenwood Press, 2000. ISBN 0-313-29649-9.
- Fabella, Virginia, R. S. Sugirtharajah. Dictionary of Third World theologies. Orbis Books, 2000. ISBN 1-57075-234-6.
- González, Justo L., Carlos F. Cardoza-Orlandi, Suzanne E. Hoeferkamp Segovia. The Westminster dictionary of theologians. Westminster John Knox Press, 2006. ISBN 0-664-22989-1.
- Hart, Trevor A., Richard Bauckham. The dictionary of historical theology. Paternoster Press; W. B. Eerdmans, 2000. ISBN 1-84227-002-8.
- McGrath, Alister E. The Blackwell encyclopedia of modern Christian thought. Blackwell, 1993. ISBN 0-631-16896-6.
- McGuckin, John Anthony. The Westminster handbook to patristic theology. Westminster John Knox Press, 2004. ISBN 0-664-22396-6.
- McKim, Donald K. Westminster dictionary of theological terms. Westminster John Knox Press, 1996. ISBN 0-664-25511-6.
- Muller, Richard A. Dictionary of Latin and Greek theological terms: Drawn principally from Protestant scholastic theology. Baker Book House, 1985. ISBN 0-8010-6185-7.
- Musser, Donald W., Joseph L. Price. New and enlarged handbook of Christian theology. Abingdon Press, 2003. ISBN 0-687-09112-8.
- Musser, Donald W., Joseph L. Price. A new handbook of Christian theologians. Abingdon Press, 1996. ISBN 0-687-27803-1.

===== Augustine of Hippo =====
- Fitzgerald, Allan, John C. Cavadini. Augustine through the ages: An encyclopedia. W.B. Eerdmans, 1999. ISBN 0-8028-3843-X.
- Mayer, Cornelius Petrus, Erich Feldmann. Augustinus-Lexikon. Schwabe, 1986–1996. ISBN 3-7965-0854-5.

===== Christian ethics =====
- Childress, James F. & John Macquarrie. The Westminster Dictionary of Christian Ethics. rev. ed., Westminster, 1986.
- Harrison, R. K. Encyclopedia of Biblical and Christian Ethics. rev. ed., Thomas Nelson, 1992.

==== Eastern Orthodox Church ====
- Day, Peter D. The liturgical dictionary of Eastern Christianity. Liturgical Press, 1993. ISBN 0-8146-5848-2.
- Langford-James, Richard Lloyd (1923). A Dictionary of the Eastern Orthodox Church. London: Faith Pr.
- Parry, Kenneth, John F. Hinnells. The Blackwell dictionary of Eastern Christianity. Blackwell, [2000]. ISBN 0-631-18966-1.
- Prokurat, Michael, Alexander Golitzin, Michael D. Peterson. Historical dictionary of the Orthodox Church. Scarecrow Press, 1996. ISBN 0-8108-3081-7.

==== Evangelicals ====
- Balmer, Randall Herbert. Encyclopedia of evangelicalism. Baylor University Press, 2004. ISBN 1-932792-04-X.
- Hillerbrand, Hans Joachim. The encyclopedia of Protestantism. Routledge, 2004. ISBN 0-415-92472-3.
- Krapohl, Robert H., Charles H. Lippy. The evangelicals: A historical, thematic, and biographical guide. Greenwood Press, 1999. ISBN 0-313-30103-4.
- Larsen, Timothy, D. W. Bebbington, Mark A. Noll. Biographical dictionary of evangelicals. InterVarsity Press, 2003. ISBN 0-8308-2925-3.
- Lewis, Donald M. The Blackwell dictionary of evangelical biography: 1730–1860. Blackwell, 1995. ISBN 0-631-17384-6.
- Moreau, A. Scott, Harold A. Netland, Charles Edward van Engen. Evangelical dictionary of world missions. Baker Books; Paternoster Press, 2000. ISBN 0-8010-2074-3.

==== Mormonism ====
- Bitton, Davis. Historical dictionary of Mormonism. Scarecrow Press, 2000. ISBN 0-8108-3797-8.
- Hillerbrand, Hans Joachim. The encyclopedia of Protestantism. Routledge, 2004. ISBN 0-415-92472-3.
- A Latter-Day Saint library: Including the encyclopedia of Mormonism/Church of Jesus Christ of Latter-Day Saints. Church of Jesus Christ of Latter-Day Saints. Infobases, 1998.
- Ludlow, Daniel H. Encyclopedia of Mormonism. Macmillan, 1992. ISBN 0-02-904040-X.

==== Oriental Orthodox churches ====
- Day, Peter D. The liturgical dictionary of Eastern Christianity. Liturgical Press, 1993. ISBN 0-8146-5848-2.
- Parry, Kenneth, John F. Hinnells. The Blackwell dictionary of Eastern Christianity. Blackwell, [2000]. ISBN 0-631-18966-1.

===== Coptic Orthodox Church =====
- Atiya, Aziz. The Coptic encyclopedia. Macmillan; Collier Macmillan Canada; Maxwell Macmillan International, 1991. ISBN 0-02-897025-X.

==== Patrology ====
- Altaner, Berthold; Alfred Stuiber, eds. (1961). Patrology [Patrologie] (2nd. ed.). New York: Herder.
- Dizionario patristico e di antichita cristiane (in Italian). Marietti: Casale Monferrato. 1983.
- McGuckin, John Anthony. The Westminster handbook to patristic theology. Westminster John Knox Press, 2004. ISBN 0-664-22396-6.
- Quasten, Johannes, ed. (1950–1960). Patrology. Lancaster, MD: Newman.

==== Protestantism ====
- Hillerbrand, Hans Joachim. The encyclopedia of Protestantism. Routledge, 2004. ISBN 0-415-92472-3.
- Melton, J. Gordon. Encyclopedia of Protestantism. Facts On File, 2005. ISBN 0-8160-5456-8.

===== Anabaptist–Mennonite =====
- Dyck, Cornelius J., Dennis D. Martin. The Mennonite encyclopedia: A comprehensive reference work on the Anabaptist-Mennonite movement. Mennonite Brethren, 1955–1990. ISBN 0-8361-3105-3.
- Hege, Christian; Christian Neff, eds. (1913–1967). Mennonitosches Lexikon. Frankfurt am Main: Authors.
- The Mennonite Encyclopedia. Hillsboro, Kansas: Mennonite Brethren Publ. House. 1955–1959.

===== Anglican =====
- Buchanan, Colin Ogilvie. Historical dictionary of Anglicanism. Scarecrow Press, 2006. ISBN 0-8108-5327-2.

====== Church of England ======
- Cockford's Clerical Directory (88th ed.). Oxford: University Press. 1980–1982.
- Fasti ecclesiae anglicanae, 1066–1300 (Rev. ed.). London, Institute of Historical Research: Athlone Pr. 1968–1977.
- Fasti ecclesiae anglicanae, 1541–1857 (Rev. ed.). London: Athlone Press. 1969–1979.
- Harford, George; Morley Stevenson, eds. (1912). The Prayer Book Dictionary. London: Pitman.
- LeNeve, John, ed. (1854). Fasti ecclesiae anglicanane. Oxford: University Press.
- Ollard, S. L., Gordon Crosse, Maurice Francis Bond. A dictionary of English church history. A.R. Mowbray; Morehouse-Gorham, [1948].

====== Protestant Episcopal Church of the United States ======
- Clerical Directory of the Protestant Episcopal Church in the United States of America. New York: Church Hymnal Corp. 1898–1968.
- Episcopal Clerical Directory. New York: Church Hymnal Corp. 1975.
- Harper, Howard V. (1975). The Episcopalian's Dictionary. New York: Seabury Pr.
- Hein, David, Gardiner H. Shattuck. The Episcopalians. Praeger, 2004. ISBN 0-313-22958-9.
- Wall, John N., Philippa J. Anderson. A dictionary for Episcopalians. Cowley Publications, 2000.

===== Baptists =====
- Brackney, William H. Historical dictionary of the Baptists. Scarecrow Press, 2009. ISBN 978-0-8108-5622-6.
- Encyclopedia of Southern Baptists (Rev. ed.). Nashville: Broadman. 1958–1982.
- Leonard, Bill. Dictionary of Baptists in America. InterVarsity Press, 1994. ISBN 0-8308-1447-7.

===== Brethren =====
- The Brethren Encyclopedia. Philadelphia: Brethren Encyclopedia, Inc. 1983–1984. ISBN 0-936693-04-5.

===== Charismatic and Pentecostal Christianity =====
- Burgess, Stanley. Dictionary of Charismatic and Pentecostal Movements. Zondervan, 1989.
- Burgess, Stanley M. Encyclopedia of Pentecostal and charismatic Christianity. Routledge, 2006. ISBN 0-415-96966-2.
- Burgess, Stanley M., Ed M. Van der Maas. The new international dictionary of Pentecostal and charismatic movements. Zondervan, 2002. ISBN 0-310-22481-0.
- DuPree, Sherry Sherrod. Biographical dictionary of African-American, Holiness-Pentecostals, 1880–1990. Middle Atlantic Regional Press, 1989. ISBN 0-9616056-9-3.

===== Church of Scotland =====
- Macgregor, Malcolm (1934). The Sources and Literature of Scottish Church History. Glasgow: McCallum.
- Scott, Hew, ed. (1915). Fasti ecclesiae scoticanae (Rev. ed.). Edinburgh: Oliver and Boyd (variable).
- Watt, Donald Elmslie Robertson (1969). Fasti ecclesiae scoticanae medii aevi ad annum 1638. 2nd draft. Edinburgh: Smith & Ritchie Ltd. for the Scottish Record Society.

===== Lutheran =====
- Bodensieck, Julius, ed. (1965). The Encyclopedia of the Lutheran Church. Minneapolis: Augsburg Publishing House.
- Gassmann, Günther, Duane H. Larson, Mark W. Oldenburg. Historical dictionary of Lutheranism. Scarecrow Press, 2001. ISBN 0-8108-3945-8.
- Luecker, Erwin L., ed. (1975). Lutheran Cyclopedia (Rev. ed.). St. Louis: Concordia.
- Nielsen, Fredrik; Andersen, Johannes Oskar (2010). Kirke-Leksikon for Norden (in Danish). BiblioBazaar. ISBN 978-1-149-77602-5.
- Wiederaenders, Robert C. Historical guide to Lutheran church bodies of North America. Lutheran Historical Conference, 1998.

===== Methodist =====
- Harmon, Nolan B., ed. (1974). The Encyclopedia of World Methodism. Nashville, TN: United Methodist Publishing House. ISBN 9780687117840.
- Methodist who's who. Culley, 1910.
- Who's Who in the Methodist Church (2nd. ed.). Nashville, TN: Abingdon Pr. 1966.
- Yrigoyen, Charles, Susan E. Warrick. Historical dictionary of Methodism. Scarecrow Press, 2005. ISBN 0-8108-5451-1.

====== Holiness movement ======
- DuPree, Sherry Sherrod. Biographical dictionary of African-American, Holiness-Pentecostals, 1880–1990. Middle Atlantic Regional Press, 1989. ISBN 0-9616056-9-3.
- Kostlevy, William. Historical dictionary of the Holiness movement. Scarecrow Press, 2009. ISBN 978-0-8108-5832-9.

===== Quakers =====
- Abbott, Margery Post, Mary ELlen Chijioke, Pink Dandelion. Historical dictionary of the Friends (Quakers). Scarecrow Press, 2003. ISBN 0-8108-4483-4.
- Hinshaw, William Wade, Thomas Worth Marshall. Encyclopedia of American Quaker genealogy. Genealogical Pub., 1991. ISBN 0-8063-0178-3.

===== Reformed =====
- Benedetto, Robert, Donald K. McKim. Historical dictionary of the Reformed Churches. Scarecrow Press, 2010. ISBN 978-0-8108-5807-7.
- McKim, Donald K., David F. Wright. Encyclopedia of the Reformed faith. Westminster/John Knox Press; Saint Andrew Press, 1992. ISBN 0-664-21882-2.
- Reformed Church in America. Commission on History, ed. (1978). Historical Directory of the Reformed Church in America, 1628–1978 (2nd. ed.). Grand Rapids, MI: Eerdmans.

====== Congregationalism ======
- Peel, Albert. The Congregational two hundred, 1530–1948. Independent Press, [1948].

===== Seventh-day Adventism =====
- Land, Gary. Historical dictionary of Seventh-Day Adventists. Scarecrow Press, 2005. ISBN 0-8108-5345-0.

===== Shakers =====
- Duffield, Holley Gene. Historical dictionary of the Shakers. Scarecrow Press, 2000. ISBN 0-8108-3683-1.

===== Unitarian Universalism =====
- Harris, Mark W. Historical dictionary of Unitarian Universalism. Scarecrow Press, 2004. ISBN 0-8108-4869-4.

===== United Church of Christ =====
- Peel, Albert (1948). The Congregational Two Hundred, 1530–1948. London: Independent Pr.

==== Roman Catholic Church ====
- Addis, William E.; Thomas Arnold, eds. (1957). A Catholic Dictionary (16th ed.). London: Routledge and Paul.
- Annuario pontificio per l'anno. Tipografia poliglotta vaticana, 1912–. ISSN 0390-7252.
- Attwater, Donald, ed. (1958). A Catholic Dictionary (3rd ed.). New York: Macmillan.
- The Catholic Encyclopedia Dictionary. New York: Gilmary Soc. 1941.
- Bouyer, Louis, ed. (1965). Dictionary of Theology [Dictionnaire theologique]. New York: Desclee.
- Broderick, Robert. The Catholic Encyclopedia. rev. ed., Thomas Nelson, 1987.
- Bunson, Matthew, Margaret Bunson, Timothy M. Dolan. OSV's encyclopedia of Catholic history. Our Sunday Visitor, 2004. ISBN 1-59276-026-0.
- Catholic Encyclopedia. New York: Encyclopedia Pr. 1907–1922.
- Collinge, William J. Historical dictionary of Catholicism. Scarecrow Press, 1997. ISBN 0-8108-3233-X.
- Coppa, Frank J. Encyclopedia of the Vatican and papacy. Greenwood Press, 1999. ISBN 0-313-28917-4.
- Coulter, Michael L. Encyclopedia of Catholic social thought, social science, and social policy. Scarecrow Press, 2007. ISBN 978-0-8108-5906-7.
- Dictionnaire de theologie catholique (in French). Paris: Letouzey. 1909–1950.
- Enciclopedia cattolica (in Italian). Vatican City: Enciclopedia Cattolica. 1949–1954.
- Glazier, Michael, Monika Hellwig. The modern Catholic encyclopedia. Liturgical Press, 2004. ISBN 0-8146-5219-0.
- Hardon, John A. (1980). Modern Catholic Dictionary. New York: Doubleday. ISBN 9780385121620.
- McBrien, Richard P., Harold W. Attridge. The HarperCollins encyclopedia of Catholicism. HarperCollins, 1995. ISBN 0-00-627931-7.
- Migne, Jacques Paul, ed. (1845–1866). Encyclopedie theologique (in French). Paris: Migne.
- Murray, Alan V. The Crusades: An encyclopedia. ABC-CLIO, 2006. ISBN 1-57607-862-0.
- New Catholic Encyclopedia. New York: McGraw-Hill. 1967–1979. ISBN 9780070102354.
- New Catholic encyclopedia. Thomson/Gale; Catholic University of America, 2003. ISBN 0-7876-4004-2.
- Nevins, Albert J., ed. (1965). Maryknoll Catholic Dictionary. Wilkes-Barre, PA: Dimension Books.
- O'Carroll, Michael, ed. (1983). Theotokos: A Theological Encyclopedia of the Blessed Virgin Mary (Rev. ed.). Wilmington, Delaware: M. Glazier.
- Rahner, Karl; et al., eds. (1968–1970). Sacramentum Mundi: An Encyclopedia of Theology. New York: Herder & Herder.
- Wetzer, Heinrich Joseph, ed. (1882–1901). Wetzer und Welte's Kirchenlexikon. Freiburg im Breisgau: Herder.

===== Biography =====
- Delaney, John J., ed. (1984). Dictionary of American Catholic Biography. Garden City, NY: Doubleday. ISBN 9780385178785.
- Delaney, John J.; James Edward Tobin, eds. (1961). Dictionary of Catholic Biography. Garden City, NY: Doubleday.
- de Troyer, Benjamin, ed. (1969–1970). Bio-bibliographia Franciscana Neerlandica (in Dutch). Nieuwkoop.
- de Troyer, Benjamin, ed. (1974). Bio-bibliographia franciscana neerlandica ante seculum XVI (in Dutch). Nieuwkoop.
- Lentz, Harris M. Popes and cardinals of the 20th century: A biographical dictionary. McFarland, 2002. ISBN 0-7864-1094-9.

====== Roman Catholic popes ======
- Coppa, Frank J. Encyclopedia of the Vatican and papacy. Greenwood Press, 1999. ISBN 0-313-28917-4.
- Coppa, Frank J. The great popes through history: An encyclopedia. Greenwood Press, 2002. ISBN 0-313-29533-6.
- Kelly, J. N. D., Michael Walsh. The Oxford dictionary of Popes. Oxford University Press, 2006. ISBN 978-0-19-861433-3.
- Levillain, Philippe. The papacy: An encyclopedia. Routledge, 2002. ISBN 0-415-92228-3.
- Mann, Horace Kinder (1925–1932). The Lives of the Popes in the Early Middle Ages. London: Kegan Paul.

===== Documents =====
- Carlen, Mary Claudia (1958). Dictionary of Papal Pronouncements: Leo XIII to Pius XII, 1878–1957. New York: Kenedy.
- Dizionario del Concilio ecumenico Vaticano secondo (in Italian). Roma: UNEDI. 1969.

===== Eastern Catholicism =====
- Day, Peter D. The liturgical dictionary of Eastern Christianity. Liturgical Press, 1993. ISBN 0-8146-5848-2.
- Parry, Kenneth, John F. Hinnells. The Blackwell dictionary of Eastern Christianity. Blackwell, [2000]. ISBN 0-631-18966-1.

===== Religious orders =====
- Cottineau, L. H. (1935–1970). Repertoire topo-bibliographique des abbayes et prieures (in French). Macon: Protat.
- Dizionario degli instituti di perfezione (in Italian). Rome: Edizione Paoline. 1974–2003.
- Helyot, Pierre (1859–1863). Dictionnaire des ordres religieux (in French). Paris: Migne.
- Knowles, David and Richard Neville Hadcock (1972). Medieval Religious Houses, England and Wales (Revised ed.). New York: St. Martin's Press.
- de Troyer, Benjamin, ed. (1969–1970). Bio-bibliographia Franciscana Neerlandica (in Dutch). Nieuwkoop.
- de Troyer, Benjamin, ed. (1974). Bio-bibliographia franciscana neerlandica ante seculum XVI (in Dutch). Nieuwkoop.

===== Roman Catholic liturgy and worship =====
- Lang, Jovian. Dictionary of the liturgy. Catholic Book, 1989. ISBN 0-89942-273-X.

=== Hinduism ===
- Dowson, John (1972). A Classical Dictionary of Hindu Mythology and Religion (12th ed.). London: Routledge and Paul.
- Fischer-Schreiber, Ingrid, Stephan Schuhmacher, Gert Woerner. The encyclopedia of Eastern philosophy and religion: Buddhism, Hinduism, Taoism, Zen. Shambhala, 1989. ISBN 0-87773-433-X.
- Geaves, Ron. Key words in Hinduism. Georgetown University Press, 2006. ISBN 1-58901-127-9.
- Jacobsen, Knut A., Helene Basu, Angelika Malinar, Vasudha Narayanan. Brill's encyclopedia of Hinduism. Brill, 2009–. ISBN 978-90-04-17641-6.
- Johnson, W. J. A dictionary of Hinduism. Oxford University Press, 2009. ISBN 978-0-19-861025-0.
- Klostermaier, Klaus K. A concise encyclopedia of Hinduism. Oneworld, 1998. ISBN 1-85168-175-2.
- Meister, Michael W., Madhusudan A. Dhaky American Institute of Indian Studies. Encyclopedia of Indian temple architecture. Philadelphia: American Institute of Indian Studies; University of Pennsylvania Press, 1983–. ISBN 0-8122-7840-2.
- Margaret Stutley (1977). A Dictionary of Hinduism. London: Routledge. ISBN 978-0-429-62754-5. OL 35543927M.
- Sullivan, Bruce M. The A to Z of Hinduism. Scarecrow Press, 2001. ISBN 0-8108-4070-7.
- Sullivan, Bruce M. Historical dictionary of Hinduism. Scarecrow Press, 1997. ISBN 0-8108-3327-1.
- Walker, George Benjamin (1968). Hindu World: An Encyclopedic Survey of Hinduism. London: Allen & Unwin.
- India Heritage Research Foundation (IHRF). Encyclopedia of Hinduism. Mandala Publishing, 2013. ISBN 978-1-60-887175-9

=== Islam ===
- Adamec, Ludwig W. Historical dictionary of Islam. Scarecrow Press, 2001. ISBN 0-8108-3962-8.
- Alam, Mohammad Manzoor, Z. M. Khan. 100 great Muslim leaders of the 20th century. Institute of Objective Studies, 2005. ISBN 81-85220-06-9.
- Bearman, P. J., Th. Bianquis, C. E. Bosworth, E. van Donzel, W. P. Heinrichs (2004). Encyclopedia of Islam online. Leiden: Brill. ISSN 1573-3912.
- Behn, Wolfgang. Concise biographical companion to index Islamicus: An international who's who in Islamic studies from its beginnings down to the twentieth century: Bio-bibliographical supplement to index Islamicus, 1665–1980. Brill, 2004–2006. ISBN 90-04-14117-0.
- Bewley, Aisha Abdurrahman. Muslim women: A biographical dictionary. Ta-Ha, 2004. ISBN 1-84200-053-5.
- Campo, Juan Eduardo (1 February 2009). Encyclopedia of Islam. Facts On File. ISBN 978-0-8160-7745-8.
- Clements, Frank. Historical dictionary of Arab and Islamic organizations. Scarecrow Press, 2001. ISBN 0-8108-3977-6.
- Coughlin, Kathryn M. Muslim cultures today: A reference guide. Greenwood Press, 2006. ISBN 0-313-32386-0.
- E. J. Brill's First Encyclopedia of Islam, 1913–1936, E. J. Brill, 1993.
- Esposito, John L. The Oxford dictionary of Islam. Oxford University Press, 2003. ISBN 0-19-512558-4.
- Esposito, John L. The Oxford encyclopedia of the modern Islamic world. Oxford University Press, 1995. ISBN 0-19-506613-8.
- Geaves, Ron. Key words in Islam. Georgetown University Press, 2006. ISBN 1-58901-124-4.
- Ghazanfar, Shaikh M. Islamic civilization: History, contributions, and influence: A compendium of literature. Scarecrow Press, 2006. ISBN 0-8108-5264-0.
- Gibb, H. A. R., J. H. Kramers, E. Levi-Provencal, J. Schacht ... (1954–1983). Encyclopedia of Islam (New ed.). Leiden: Brill.
- Gibb, H. A. R. and J. H. Kramers (1953). Shorter Encyclopedia of Islam. Leiden: Brill.
- Glasse, Cyril. Concise Encyclopedia of Islam. HarperCollins, 1989.
- Glassé, Cyril; Smith, Huston (1 February 2003). The New Encyclopedia of Islam. Rowman Altamira. ISBN 978-0-7591-0190-6.
- Houtsma, Th., M. Seligsohn, T. W. Arnold, and A. Schaade. Encyclopedia of Islam. Brill, 1908–10.
- Handworterbuch des Islam. Leiden: Brill. 1941.
- Joseph, Suad, Afsaneh Najmabadi. Encyclopedia of women and Islamic cultures. Brill, 2003–2007. ISBN 978-90-04-13247-4.
- Kramme, U., Ž. Urra Muena. Arab-Islamic biographical archive (AIBA). K. G. Saur, 1994–2002. ISBN 3-598-33895-3.
- Leaman, Oliver. The biographical encyclopedia of Islamic philosophy. Thoemmes Continuum, 2006. ISBN 1-84371-148-6.
- Madelung, Wilferd, Farhad Daftary, Kāẓim Mūsavī Bujnūrdī. Encyclopaedia Islamica. Brill, in association with The Institute of Ismaili Studies, 2009–. ISBN 978-90-04-16860-2.
- Mawṣililī, Ahmad. Historical dictionary of Islamic fundamentalist movements in the Arab world, Iran, and Turkey. Scarecrow Press, 1999. ISBN 0-8108-3609-2.
- Meri, Josef W. (31 October 2005). Medieval Islamic Civilization: An Encyclopedia. Psychology Press. ISBN 978-0-415-96690-0.
- Meri, Josef W., Jere L. Bacharach. Medieval Islamic civilization: An encyclopedia. Routledge, 2006. ISBN 0-415-96691-4.
- Netton, Ian Richard. A popular dictionary of Islam. Humanities Press International, 1992. ISBN 0-391-03756-0.
- Noegel, Scott B., Brannon M. Wheeler. Historical dictionary of prophets in Islam and Judaism. Scarecrow Press, 2002. ISBN 0-8108-4305-6.
- Petersen, Andrew. Dictionary of Islamic architecture. Routledge, 1996. ISBN 0-415-06084-2.
- Petersen, Andrew (11 March 2002). Dictionary of Islamic Architecture. Taylor & Francis. ISBN 978-0-203-20387-3.
- Shaikh, Farzana. Islam and Islamic Groups: A Worldwide Reference Guide. Gale Research, 1992.
- Singh, Nagendra Kr. Encyclopaedia of Muslim biography: India, Pakistan, Bangladesh. A. P. H., 2001. ISBN 81-7648-230-7.
- Weekes, Richard V. Muslim peoples: A world ethnographic survey. Greenwood Press, 1984. ISBN 0-313-23392-6.

==== Qur'an ====
- Leaman, Oliver. The Qur'ān: An encyclopedia. Routledge, 2006. ISBN 0-415-32639-7.
- McAuliffe, Jane Dammen et al. (2001–2006), Encyclopaedia of the Qur'an, 1st Edition., 5 vols, c. 2,500 pages, plus index., Leiden: Brill Publishers. ISBN 978-90-04-14743-0.
- Mir, Mustansir. Dictionary of Qur'ānic terms and concepts. Garland, 1987. ISBN 0-8240-8546-9.

==== Sufism ====
- Renard, John. Historical dictionary of Sufism. Scarecrow Press, 2005. ISBN 0-8108-5342-6.

=== Jainism ===
- Chanchreek, K. L., Mahesh K. Jain. Encyclopedia of Jain Religion. Shree Publishers and Distributors, 2005. ISBN 81-88658-84-7.
- Wiley, Kristi L. Historical dictionary of Jainism. Scarecrow Press, 2004. ISBN 0-8108-5051-6.

=== Judaism ===
- Alpher, Joseph. Encyclopedia of Jewish History: Events and Eras of the Jewish History. Facts on File, 1986.
- Ausubel, Nathan (1964). The Book of Jewish Knowledge. New York: Crown.
- Birnbaum, Philip. A book of Jewish concepts. Hebrew, [1975]. ISBN 0-88482-876-X.
- Cohn-Sherbok, Dan. Blackwell Dictionary of Judaica. Blackwell, 1992.
- Edelheit, Hershel, Abraham J. Edelheit. History of Zionism: A handbook and dictionary. Westview, [2000]. ISBN 0-8133-2981-7.
- Ehrlich, Mark Avrum (2009). Encyclopedia of the Jewish Diaspora: Origins, Experiences, and Culture. ABC-CLIO. p. 116. ISBN 978-1-85109-873-6.
- Encyclopedia Judaica. New York: Macmillan. 1972.
- Encyclopedia Judaica Yearbook, 1973-. Jerusalem: Encyclopedia Judaica. 1973.
- Encyclopedia Judaica: Decennial Book, 1973–1982. Jerusalem: Encyclopedia Judaica. 1982.
- Encyclopedia Judaica: Das Judentum in Geschichte und Gegenwart (in German). Berlin: Verlag Eschkol. 1928–1934.
- Encyclopedie de la mystique juive (in French). Paris: Berg International. 1977.
- Fischel, Jack and Sanford Pinsker. Jewish-American History and Culture: An Encyclopedia. Garland, 1992.
- Frankel, Ellen and Betsy Platin Teutsch. Encyclopedia of Jewish Symbols. Jason Aronson, 1992.
- Geaves, Ron. Key words in Judaism. Georgetown University Press, 2006. ISBN 1-58901-128-7.
- Judisches Lexikon (in German). Berlin: Judischer Verlag. 1927–1930.
- Klenicki, Leon, Geoffrey Wigoder. A dictionary of the Jewish-Christian dialogue. Paulist Press, c1995. ISBN 0-8091-3582-5.
- Landman, Isaac, ed. (1939–1944). Universal Jewish Encyclopedia. New York: Universal Jewish Encyclopedia, Inc.
- Lévy, Joseph Josy, Marc Eliany, Josué Elkouby. Dictionnaire biographique du monde juif sépharade et méditérranéen. Éditions Élysée, [2001]. ISBN 0-88545-098-1.
- Lexikon des Judentums (in German). Guttersloh, Germany: Bertelsmann. 1967.
- Medoff, Rafael, Chaim Isaac Waxman. Historical dictionary of Zionism. Scarecrow Press, 2000. ISBN 0-8108-3773-0.
- Neusner, Jacob, Alan J. Avery-Peck, William Scott Green. The encyclopaedia of Judaism. Brill, 2005. ISBN 90-04-14787-X.
- Noegel, Scott B., Brannon M. Wheeler. Historical dictionary of prophets in Islam and Judaism. Scarecrow Press, 2002. ISBN 0-8108-4305-6.
- Patai, Raphael, ed. (1971). Encyclopedia of Zionism and Israel. New York: Herzl Pr.
- Roth, Cecil & Geoffrey Wigoder. Encyclopedia Judaica. Kester, 1982.
- Schiffman, Lawrence H., James C. VanderKam. Encyclopedia of the Dead Sea scrolls. Oxford University Press, 2000. ISBN 0-19-508450-0.
- Shulman, Albert M., ed. (1971). Gateway to Judaism: Encyclopedia Home Reference. South Brunswick, NJ: T. Yoseloff.
- Singer, Isidore, ed. (1901–1906). Jewish Encyclopedia. New York: Funk & Wagnalls., 12 vols, over 18,000 articles. LCCN 16-14703. Free online access available.
- Skolnik, Fred, Michael Berenbaum. Encyclopaedia Judaica. Macmillan Reference USA; Keter, 2007. ISBN 978-0-02-865928-2.
- Solomon, Nathan. Historical dictionary of Judaism. Scarecrow Press, 2006. ISBN 0-8108-5504-6.
- Werblowsky, Raphael Jehuda Zwi; Geoffrey Wigoder, eds. (1966). The Encyclopedia of the Jewish Religion. Jerusalem: Massada-P. E. C. Pr.
- Wigoder, Geoffrey. Encyclopedia of Judaism. Macmillan, 1989.
- Wigoder, Geoffrey. Encyclopedic Dictionary of Judaica. Keter, 1974.
- Wigoder, Geoffrey, ed. (1975). Everyman's Judaica: An Encyclopedic Dictionary. Jerusalem: Keter Publ. House.
- Wigoder, Geoffrey. New encyclopedia of Zionism and Israel. Fairleigh Dickinson University Press; Associated University Presses, 1994. ISBN 0-8386-3433-8.
- Wigoder, Geoffrey, ed. (1977). The New Standard Jewish Encyclopedia (New rev. ed.). Garden City, NY: Doubleday.
- Zevin, Shlomo Josef, ed. (1969–1974). Encyclopedia Talmudica [Entsiklopedah talmudit]. Jerusalem: Talmudic Encyclopedia Inst.

==== Biography ====
- Cohn-Sherbok, Dan. The dictionary of Jewish biography. Oxford University Press, 2005. ISBN 0-19-522391-8.
- Hyman, Paula, Deborah Dash Moore, Phyllis Holman Weisbard. Jewish women in America: An historical encyclopedia. Routledge, 1997. ISBN 0-415-91936-3.
- Lapide, Pinchas; Hilmar Schmuck, eds. (1994). Jewish biographical archive [Jüdisches biographisches archiv]. München, Germany: K. G. Saur. ISBN 3-598-33604-7.
- Lévy, Joseph Josy, Marc Eliany, Josué Elkouby. Dictionnaire biographique du monde juif sépharade et méditérranéen. Éditions Élysée, [2001]. ISBN 0-88545-098-1. Also available on the internet as Dictionnaire Biographique du Monde Juif Sépharade et Méditérranéen, here
- Marcus, Jacob Rader, Judith M. Daniels. The concise dictionary of American Jewish biography. Carlson Publ., 1994. ISBN 0-926019-74-0.
- Morgenstern, Hans. Jüdisches biographisches Lexikon: eine Sammlung von bedeutenden Persönlichkeiten jüdischer Herkunft ab 1800. Berlin Münster: Lit, 2011. ISBN 978-3-7000-0703-6.
- Polner, Murray. American Jewish biographies. Facts on File, [1982]. ISBN 0-87196-462-7.
- Rosenbloom, Joseph R., ed. (1960). A Biographical Dictionary of Early American Jews. Lexington: University of Kentucky Pr.
- Who's who in Israel and Jewish personalities from all over the world. Bronfman, 1945–2001.
- Who's who in world Jewry. Pitman, 1955–1988. ISSN 0511-9138.
- Wininger, Salomon, ed. (1925–1937). Grosse judische National-Biographie (in German). Jerusalem: Talmudic Encyclopedia Inst.

==== Handbooks ====
- Kaplan, Aryeh (1979). The Handbook of Jewish Thought. Moznaim Publishing Corporation.

Birnbaum, Philip (1975). A Book of Jewish Concepts (Rev. ed.). New York: Hebrew Pub. Co. ISBN 9780884828761.

- Klein, Isaac (1979). A Guide to Jewish Religious Practice (Rev. ed.). New York: Jewish Theological Seminary of America. ISBN 9780873340045.
- Trepp, Leo (1980). The Complete Book of Jewish Observance (Rev. ed.). New York: Summit Books.

==== History ====
- Abramson, Glenda, Dovid Katz. The Blackwell companion to Jewish culture: From the eighteenth century to the present. Blackwell Reference, 1989. ISBN 0-631-15111-7.
- Gribetz, Judah. Timetables of Jewish History: A Chronology of the Most Important People and Events in Jewish History. Simon & Schuster, 1993.
- Kantor, Mattis. Jewish Time Line Encyclopedia. Jason Aronson, 1989.
- Neusner, Jacob, William Scott Green.Dictionary of Judaism in the biblical period: 450 B.C.E. to 600 C.E. Macmillan Library Reference, 1996. ISBN 0-02-897292-9.
- Shamir, Ilana and Shlomo Shavit. Young Reader's Encyclopedia of Jewish History. Viking Kestral, 1987.
- Spector, Shmuel, Geoffrey Wigoder. The encyclopedia of Jewish life before and during the Holocaust. Yad Vashem; New York University Press, 2001. ISBN 0-8147-9356-8.

=== Native American religions ===
- Bastian, Dawn E., Judy K. Mitchell. Handbook of Native American mythology. ABC-CLIO, 2004. ISBN 1-85109-533-0.
- Crawford, Suzanne J., Dennis F. Kelley. American Indian religious traditions: An encyclopedia. ABC-CLIO, 2005. ISBN 1-57607-517-6.
- Gill, Sam and Irene Sullivan. Dictionary of Native American Mythology. ABC-Clio, 1992.
- Hirschfelder, Arlene B., Paulette Fairbanks Molin, Walter R. Echo-Hawk. Encyclopedia of Native American religions: An introduction. Facts On File, 2000. ISBN 0-8160-3949-6.
- Johnson, Troy R. Distinguished Native American spiritual practitioners and healers. Oryx Press, 2002. ISBN 1-57356-358-7.
- Lyon, William S. Encyclopedia of Native American healing. ABC-CLIO, 1996. ISBN 0-87436-852-9.
- Lyon, William S. Encyclopedia of Native American shamanism: Sacred ceremonies of North America. ABC-CLIO, 1998. ISBN 0-87436-933-9.

=== New religious movements ===
- Chryssides, George D. Historical dictionary of new religious movements. Scarecrow Press, 2001. ISBN 0-8108-4095-2.
- Clarke, Peter B. Encyclopedia of new religious movements. Routledge, 2006. ISBN 0-415-26707-2.
- Lewis, James R. The encyclopedia of cults, sects, and new religions. Prometheus Books, 2002. ISBN 1-57392-888-7.
- Melton, J. Gordon. Biographical dictionary of American cult and sect leaders. Garland, 1986. ISBN 0-8240-9037-3.
- Melton, J. Gordon. Encyclopedic Handbook of Cults in America. 2nd ed., Garland, 1992. ISBN 0-8153-0502-8.
- Melton, J. Gordon, Jerome Clark, Aidan A. Kelly. New Age encyclopedia: A guide to the beliefs, concepts, terms, people, and organizations that make up the new global movement toward spiritual development, health and healing, higher consciousness, and related subjects. Gale Research, 1990. ISBN 0-8103-7159-6.
- Partridge, Christopher H. New religions: a guide: New religious movements, sects, and alternative spiritualities. Oxford University Press, 2004. ISBN 0-19-522042-0.

==== Wicca and witchcraft ====
- Encyclopedia of Witchcraft and Demonology. Crown, 1959.
- Guiley, Rosemary Ellen. The Encyclopedia of Witches and Witchcraft. Facts on File, 1989.

=== Philosophy of religion ===
- Brown, Stephen F., Juan Carlos Flores. Historical dictionary of medieval philosophy and theology. Scarecrow Press, 2007. ISBN 0-8108-5326-4.
- MacGregor, Geddes.Dictionary of religion and philosophy. Paragon House, 1989. ISBN 1-55778-019-6.
- Russell, Letty M., J. Shannon Clarkson. Dictionary of feminist theologies. Westminster John Knox Press, 1996. ISBN 0-664-22058-4.
- Thiselton, Anthony C. A concise encyclopedia of the philosophy of religion. Baker Academic, 2005. ISBN 0-8010-3120-6.

=== Religion by region ===
==== African religion ====
- Glazier, Stephen D. Encyclopedia of African and African-American religions. Routledge, 2001. ISBN 0-415-92245-3.
- The Dictionary of African Christian Biography: Recording the Untold Stories of African Christians who Have Transformed Africa and the Christian World. 2003.

==== European religion ====
===== English religion =====
- Ollard, S. L., Gordon Crosse, Maurice Francis Bond. A dictionary of English church history. A.R. Mowbray; Morehouse-Gorham, [1948].

==== North American religion ====
- Keller, Rosemary Skinner, Rosemary Radford Ruether, Marie Cantlon. Encyclopedia of women and religion in North America. Indiana University Press, 2006. ISBN 0-253-34685-1.

===== American (U.S.) religion =====
- Benowitz, June Melby. Encyclopedia of American women and religion. ABC-CLIO, 1998. ISBN 0-87436-887-1.
- Bowden, Henry Warner. Dictionary of American religious biography. Greenwood Press, 1993. ISBN 0-313-27825-3.
- De La Torre, Miguel A. Hispanic American religious cultures. ABC-CLIO, 2009. ISBN 978-1-59884-139-8.
- Fischel, Jack and Sanford Pinsker. Jewish-American History and Culture: An Encyclopedia. Garland, 1992.
- Hill, Samuel S. Encyclopedia of Religion in the South. Mercer University Press, 1984.
- Krapohl, Robert H., Charles H. Lippy. The evangelicals: A historical, thematic, and biographical guide. Greenwood Press, 1999. ISBN 0-313-30103-4.
- Leonard, Bill. Dictionary of Baptists in America. InterVarsity Press, 1994. ISBN 0-8308-1447-7.
- Lippy, Charles H., Peter W. Williams. Encyclopedia of religion in America. CQ Press, 2010. ISBN 978-0-87289-580-5.
- Lippy, Charles S. & Peter W. Williams. Encyclopedia of the American Religious Experience: Studies of Traditions and Movements. Scribner's, 1988.
- Meadth, Frank. Handbook of Denominations in the United States. Abingdon, 1990.
- Melton, J. Gordon. Biographical dictionary of American cult and sect leaders. Garland, 1986. ISBN 0-8240-9037-3.
- Melton, J. Gordon. The Encyclopedia of American Religions. 4th ed., Gale Research, 1992.
- Melton, J. Gordon, James Sauer. The encyclopedia of American religions, religious creeds: A compilation of more than 450 creeds, confessions, statements of faith, and summaries of doctrine of religious and spiritual groups in the United States and Canada. Gale Research, 1988–1994. ISBN 0-8103-2132-7.
- Melton, J. Gordon. Encyclopedic Handbook of Cults in America. 2nd ed., Garland, 1992. ISBN 0-8153-0502-8.
- Melton, J. Gordon, James A. Beverley, Constance M. Jones, Pamela Susan Nadell. Melton's encyclopedia of American religions. Gale Cengage Learning, 2009. ISBN 978-0-7876-9696-2.
- Melton, J. Gordon. Religious leaders of America. Gale Research, 1991–. ISSN 1057-2961.
- Murphy, Larry, J. Gordon Melton, Gary L. Ward. Encyclopedia of African American Religions. Garland, 1993.
- Piepkorn, Arthur. Profiles in Belief: The Religious Bodies of the United States and Canada. Harper, 1977–79.
- Queen, Edward L., Stephen R. Prothero, Gardiner H. Shattuck. Encyclopedia of American religious history. Facts on File, 2001. ISBN 0-8160-4335-3.
- Reid, Daniel G. Dictionary of Christianity in America: A Comprehensive Resource on the Religious Impulse That Shaped a Continent. Intervarsity, 1990.
- Roof, Wade Clark.Contemporary American religion. Macmillan Reference USA, 2000. ISBN 0-02-864926-5.
- Shriver, George H., Bill Leonard. Encyclopedia of religious controversies in the United States. Greenwood Press, 1997. ISBN 0-313-29691-X.
- Wiederaenders, Robert C. Historical guide to Lutheran church bodies of North America. Lutheran Historical Conference, 1998.
- Williamson, William. Encyclopedia of Religions in the United States: One Hundred Religious Groups Speak for Themselves. Crossroad, 1992.

====== African-American religion ======
- DuPree, Sherry Sherrod. Biographical dictionary of African-American, Holiness-Pentecostals, 1880–1990. Middle Atlantic Regional Press, 1989. ISBN 0-9616056-9-3.
- Glazier, Stephen D. Encyclopedia of African and African-American religions. Routledge, 2001. ISBN 0-415-92245-3.
- Payne, Wardell J. Directory of African American religious bodies: A compendium by the Howard University School of Divinity. Howard University Press, 1995. ISBN 0-88258-184-8.

===== Canadian religion =====
- Piepkorn, Arthur. Profiles in Belief: The Religious Bodies of the United States and Canada. Harper, 1977–79.

==== Bolivian religion ====
- Candia, Antonio Paredes. Diccionario mitológico de Bolivia: Dioses, símbolos, héroes. Ediciones Isla; Librería-Editorial Popular, 1981.

=== Religious education ===
- Cully, Iris V. & Kendig Brubaker. Harper's Encyclopedia of Religious Education. HarperCollins, 1990.

=== Religious music ===
- Foley, Edward, Mark Paul Bangert. Worship music: A concise dictionary. Liturgical Press, 2000. ISBN 0-8146-5889-X.
- Swain, Joseph Peter. Historical dictionary of sacred music. Scarecrow Press, 2006. ISBN 978-0-8108-5530-4.

==== Christian music ====
- Julian, John, ed. (1907). A Dictionary of Hymnology [Patrologie] (Rev. ed.). New York: Scribner.
- Poultney, David. Dictionary of Western Church Music. American Library Association, 1991.

=== Science and religion ===
- Ecker, Ronald L. (1990). Dictionary of Science and Creationism. Prometheus Books.
- van Huyssteen, Wentzel (2003). Encyclopedia of science and religion. Macmillan Reference. ISBN 0-02-865704-7.

=== Shinto ===
- Picken, Stuart D. B. (2006). The A to Z of Shinto. Scarecrow Press. ISBN 0-8108-5586-0.

=== Sikhism ===
- Cole, W. Owen, Piara Singh Sambhi. A popular dictionary of Sikhism. NTC Pub. Group, 1997. ISBN 0-8442-0424-2.
- Dogra, R. C., Urmila Dogra. The Sikh world: An encyclopaedic survey of Sikh religion and culture. UBSPD, 2003. ISBN 81-7476-443-7.
- The Encyclopaedia of Sikhism. Punjabi University, 1992–1998. ISBN 81-7380-530-X.
- McLeod, W. H. Historical dictionary of Sikhism. Scarecrow Press, 2005. ISBN 0-8108-5088-5.

== See also ==
- Bibliography of encyclopedias
