= Joseph L. Price =

American professor

Joseph L. Price is an American professor. Since 1982, Price has been a professor of religious studies at Whittier College, a secular liberal arts college in Whittier, California. His teaching of sports and religion has brought media attention and he has been featured as a guest speaker on NPR, appeared in a segment on the CBS Good Morning, and in a documentary produced by the NFL.

== Personal life ==
Price is the son and grandson of ministers. Since early childhood, Price has been a major baseball fan. Before becoming a professor of religious studies, Price frequently taught biblical studies to adult classes in different churches.

Price met and married his wife Bonnie, an elementary school teacher, in Kentucky in 1973.

In 1982, he received a doctorate from the University of Chicago Divinity School.

== Career ==
Price is the Genevieve Shaul Connick Professor of Religious Studies at Whittier College. With a doctorate in theology and culture, he has taught more than thirty different courses, ranging from "The Life and Teaching of Jesus" to "Latin American Liberation Theologies" and from "Cinema and Religion" to "Sport, Play, and Ritual."

He is the author and co-editor of several theological works, including Tillich and A New Handbook of Christian Theology, he has also published numerous essays and books on sports and religion, including From Season to Season: Sports as American Religion and Rounding the Bases: Baseball and Religion in America.

Combining his interests in sports, ritual studies, and music, he has sung the national anthem for more than 125 professional baseball games in 20 Major League ballparks (including Candlestick Park, Dodger Stadium, Angel Stadium, and Comiskey Park) and 100 minor league stadiums in 42 states. His personal quest, which began in 1977, is to perform in every major ballpark in the country. In 2011, he undertook a cross-country tour that saw him perform the anthem in 104 different minor league ballparks, resulting in the book Perfect Pitch: The National Anthem for the National Pastime (2018).

In 2015, Price co-founded the Institute for Baseball Studies on the campus of Whittier College. He is currently the Institute's co-director chair. The Institute is the first humanities-based research center of its kind related with a college or university in the United States. The Institute's collection includes photos of Shoeless Joe Jackson; Babe Ruth on a movie set "The Catch"; and papers of different baseball historians and journalists, among other archives. The institute is open to the public on Fridays.

== Relevant literature ==
- Price, Donald L. and Donald Musser. Nov. 2025. We won: The Autobiography of a Friendship. Macon, GA: Mercer University Press.
