= William Scott Green =

- Title: Fain Family Endowed Chair in Judaic Studies
- Spouse: Rebecca MacMillan Fox
- Awards: Eastman Medal, University of Rochester

Academic background
- Education: Brown University (PhD), Dartmouth College (AB)
- Thesis: The legal traditions of Joshua ben Ḥananiah in Mishnah -Tosefta and related materials. (1974)
- Doctoral advisor: Jacob Neusner

Academic work
- Institutions: University of Rochester, University of Miami

William Scott Green is professor of religious studies and holds the Fain Family Endowed Chair in Judaic Studies at the University of Miami. He previously taught at the University of Rochester, where he is Philip S. Bernstein Professor Emeritus of Judaic Studies, and was an administrator there, now holding the title of Dean Emeritus of the College.

== Early life and education ==
Green's father, William S. Green, was a lawyer from Manchester, New Hampshire and served as the state's deputy attorney general. His mother, Joan Green, was a social worker.

Green attended Mount Hermon School and received his undergraduate education at Dartmouth College, where he was awarded an A.B. in religion. In 1967, he was editor of The Dartmouth, the college's newspaper. He was a member of the class of 1968. At Dartmouth, he became a student of Jacob Neusner, who was teaching there at the time.

He earned a Ph.D. from Brown University. He had followed Neusner there from Dartmouth, becoming one of his first graduate students.

== Career ==
Green became a faculty member at the University of Rochester in 1974.

By 1981, Green was an associate professor at the University of Rochester and chair of the program in religious studies. He would be founding chair of the university's Department of Religion and Classics.

Green's doctoral research was published by Brill in 1981 as The Traditions of Joshua Ben Hananiah.

In the 1981–82 academic year, he was R.T. French Visiting Fellow at Worcester College of Oxford University.

He was appointed professor of religion at the University of Rochester in 1985. In 1991, he was named Philip S Bernstein Professor of Judaic Studies. He was dean of undergraduate studies from 1991 to 1996. From 1996 to 2006 he was dean of the college. He collaborated with a faculty committee to introduce the university's "Rochester Curriculum," which prioritized the ability of students to pursue intellectual passions.

Green left Rochester in 2006 and moved to the University of Miami, where he became professor of religious studies, senior vice provost, and dean of undergraduate education.

In 2010, Green received Rochester's Eastman Medal at commencement.

He left his administrative post at the University of Miami in 2020, but remained on the faculty.

== Editor ==
Green took over as editor of the Journal of the American Academy of Religion in 1984.

== Personal life ==
Green married Rebecca MacMillan Fox in 1981 at the home of her sister and brother-in-law Elizabeth Fox-Genovese and Eugene Dominic Genovese. The ceremony was performed by Neusner.
