= John Farrar (minister) =

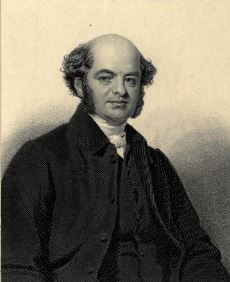

President of the Methodist Conference
- In office 1854–1855
- Preceded by: John Lomas
- Succeeded by: Isaac Keeling
- In office 1870–1871
- Preceded by: Frederick James Jobson
- Succeeded by: John H James

Personal details
- Born: 29 July 1802 Alnwick, Northumberland
- Died: 19 November 1884 (aged 82) Headingley, Leeds
- Occupation: Methodist minister

Rev. John Farrar (1802–1884) was a Methodist minister. He was Secretary of the annual British Methodist Conference on fourteen occasions, and was twice its elected President. Farrar was tutor and governor of several Wesleyan colleges. These included the early Wesleyan training college at Abney House, near London; and British Methodism's first purpose-built college at Richmond, now Richmond University.

== Life ==
Farrar, the third and youngest son of the Rev. John Farrar (d.1837), a Wesleyan minister, was born at Alnwick, Northumberland, on 29 July 1802. On the opening of Woodhouse Grove School, Yorkshire, for the education of the sons of ministers, on 12 January 1812, he became one of its first pupils. On leaving school, he was employed as a teacher in an academy conducted by Mr. Green at Cottingham, near Hull. In August 1822, he entered the Wesleyan ministry, and spent his four years of probation as second-master in Woodhouse Grove School. He was afterwards resident minister successively at Sheffield, Huddersfield, Macclesfield and London, until in 1839 he was appointed tutor and governor of Abney House Training College in Stoke Newington, London, the larger part of whose grounds had recently become an arboretum and cemetery, Abney Park Cemetery.

Upon its opening in 1843, John Farrar became classics tutor at the Wesleyan Theological Institution at Richmond, Surrey, where he spent fourteen years. In 1858, he returned to Woodhouse Grove School, as governor and chaplain. On the foundation of the Wesleyan Theological College at Headingley, Leeds, in 1868, he became the first governor, and retained the chair until failing health compelled his retirement in 1876. During his residence here, the jubilee of his ministry occurred, when he was presented with an organ for the college, where a marble bust of himself now preserves the memory of his connection with the institution.

In 1854, the Wesleyan conference, appreciating his administrative qualities, elected Farrar president of the conference held at Birmingham; and on the occasion of the Burslem conference in 1870 he had the rare honour of being elected president a second time. Three years before his first election as president he became Secretary to the Conference, a position to which he was repeatedly re-elected, and for eighteen years, between 1858 and 1876, he was Chairman of the Leeds district. He lived to take part in the Wesleyans' closing (June 1883) and refounding (September 1883) of Woodhouse Grove School, to widen its intake of pupils.

Farrar wrote several books, including two religious dictionaries, one dealing with the Bible and its contents, the other referring to ecclesiastical events.

He married the youngest daughter of another Wesleyan minister, the Rev. Miles Martindale, whose own knowledge of the Methodist movement greatly assisted him in many of the offices which he held. He died at Headingley, Leeds, on 19 November 1884, and was buried near London at Abney Park Cemetery, Stoke Newington, on 25 November.

== Publications ==
1. The Proper Names of the Bible, their Orthography, Pronunciation, and Signification. 1839; 2nd edition, 1844.
2. A Biblical and Theological Dictionary, illustrative of the Old and New Testament. 1851.
3. An Ecclesiastical Dictionary, explanatory of the History, Antiquities, Heresies, Sects, and Religious Denominations of the Christian Church. 1853.
4. A Manual of Biblical Geography, Descriptive, Physical, and Historical. 1857.
5. A Key to the Pronunciation of the Names of Persons and Places mentioned in the Bible. 1857
