= Miles Martindale =

English Wesleyan minister

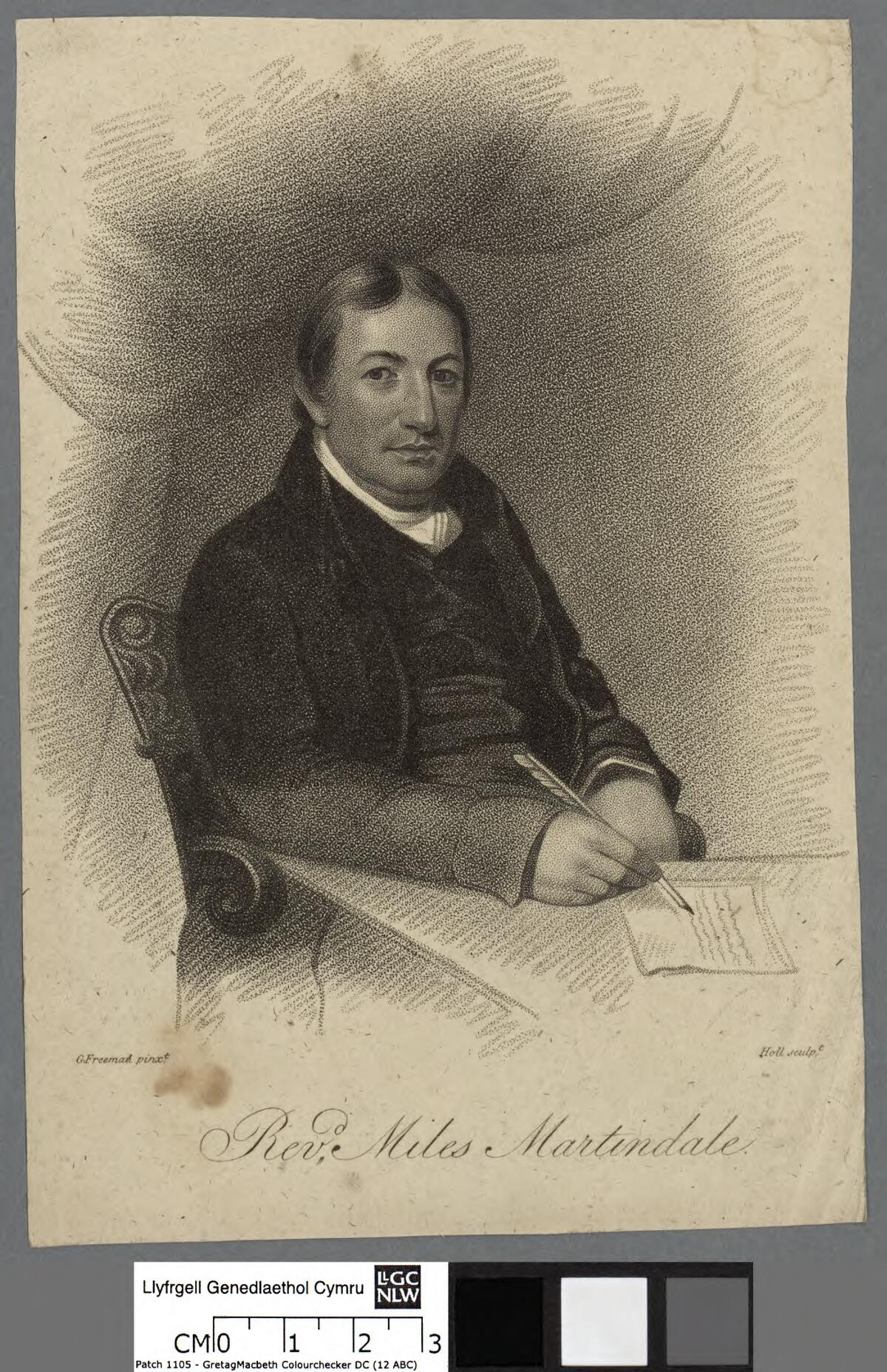
Portrait of Miles Martindale

Miles Martindale (1756–1824) was an English Wesleyan minister.

== Life ==
The son of Paul Martindale, he was born in 1756 at Moss Bank, near St Helens, Lancashire. He had little education slender education, but was self-taught in French, Latin, and Greek. In 1776 he went to live at Liverpool; the next year he married, and about the same time he became a Methodist.

From 1786 to 1789 Martindale was a local preacher, mainly at Scorton in the Wirral. In 1789 he was received as a Wesleyan minister, and remained in the regular itinerancy 27 years, when he was appointed governor of Woodhouse Grove School, Yorkshire (1816).

Martindale died of cholera on 6 August 1824, while attending the Wesleyan conference at Leeds.

== Works ==
Martindale published, besides sermons:

- 'Elegy on the Death of Wesley,' 1791.
- 'Britannia's Glory,' a poem, 1793.
- 'Original Poems, Sacred and Moral,' 1806.
- 'Grace and Nature, a Poem in twenty-four Cantos,' translated from the French of John William Fletcher, 1810.
- 'Dictionary of the Holy Bible,' 1818, 2 vols.
- 'Essay on the Eloquence of the Pulpit,' translated from the French of Joseph-Marie-Anne Gros de Besplas., 1819.

== Family ==
Martindale was married to Margaret King, who died in 1840, and left three daughters: one of whom married John Farrar; another was the wife of the Rev. James Brownell; and the third became matron of Wesley College, Sheffield.

== Notes ==
Attribution

This article incorporates text from a publication now in the public domain: Lee, Sidney, ed. (1893). "Martindale, Miles". Dictionary of National Biography. Vol. 36. London: Smith, Elder & Co.
