= Skirt =

Clothing worn from the waist or hips

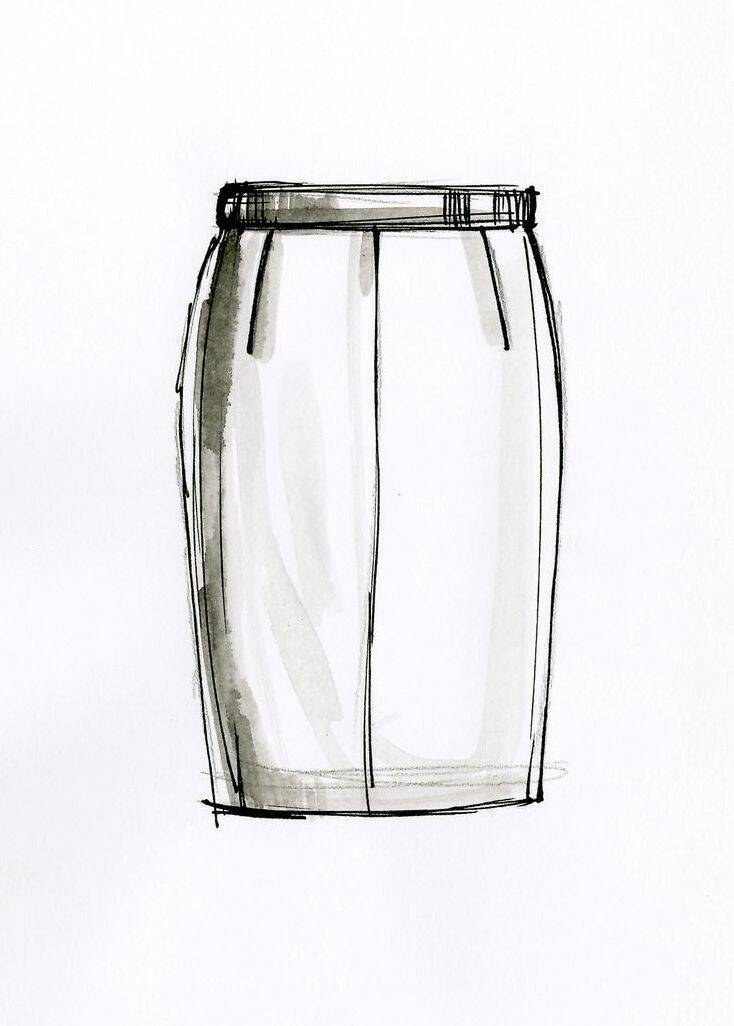
- Type: Clothing worn from the waist.
- Material: fabric

A skirt is the lower part of a dress or a separate outer garment that covers a person from the waist downwards.

At its simplest, a skirt can be a draped garment made out of a single piece of fabric (such as pareos). However, most skirts are fitted to the body at the waist and fuller below, with the fullness introduced by means of darts, gores, pleats, or panels. Modern skirts are usually made of light to mid-weight fabrics, such as denim, jersey, worsted, or poplin. Skirts of thin or clingy fabrics are often worn with slips to make the material of the skirt drape better and for modesty.

In modern times, skirts are commonly worn by women and girls. Some exceptions include the izaar, worn in multiple Muslim cultures, and the kilt, a traditional men's garment in Scotland, Ireland, and England.

The hemline of skirts can vary from micro to floor-length and can vary according to cultural conceptions of modesty and aesthetics as well as the wearer's personal taste, which can be influenced by such factors as fashion and social context. Most skirts are complete garments, but some skirt-looking panels may be part of another garment such as leggings, shorts, and swimsuits.

== History ==
=== Prehistory and ancient history ===
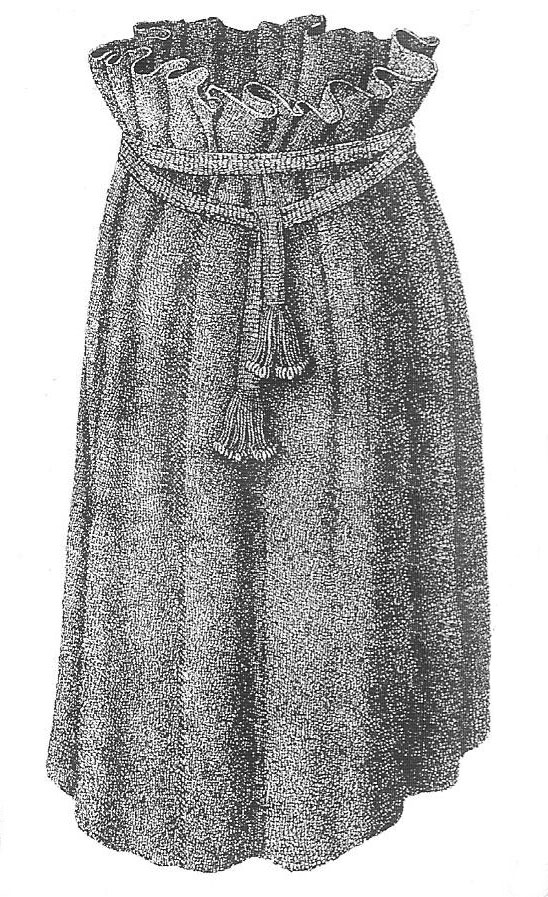
Drawing of a girl's skirt made of wool yarn found in a Bronze Age tomb in Borum Eshøj, Denmark

Skirts have been worn since prehistoric times as the simplest way to cover the lower body. Figurines produced by the Vinča culture (c. 5700–4500 BC) located on the territory of present-day Serbia and neighboring Balkans from the start of the Copper Age show women in skirt-like garments.

A straw-woven skirt dating to 3900 BC was discovered in Armenia at the Areni-1 cave. Skirts were the standard attire for men and women in all ancient cultures in the Near East and Egypt. The Sumerians in Mesopotamia wore kaunakes (Ancient Greek: καυνάκης, romanized: kaunákēs, ultimately from Sumerian: 𒌆𒄖𒅘𒆪 ^{TÚG}GU-NAK-KU), a type of fur skirt tied to a belt. The term originally referred to a sheep's fleece, but eventually came to be applied to the garment itself. Eventually, the animal pelts were replaced by "kaunakes cloth", a textile that imitated fleecy sheepskin. Kaunakes cloth also served as a symbol in religious iconography, such as in the fleecy cloak of John the Baptist.

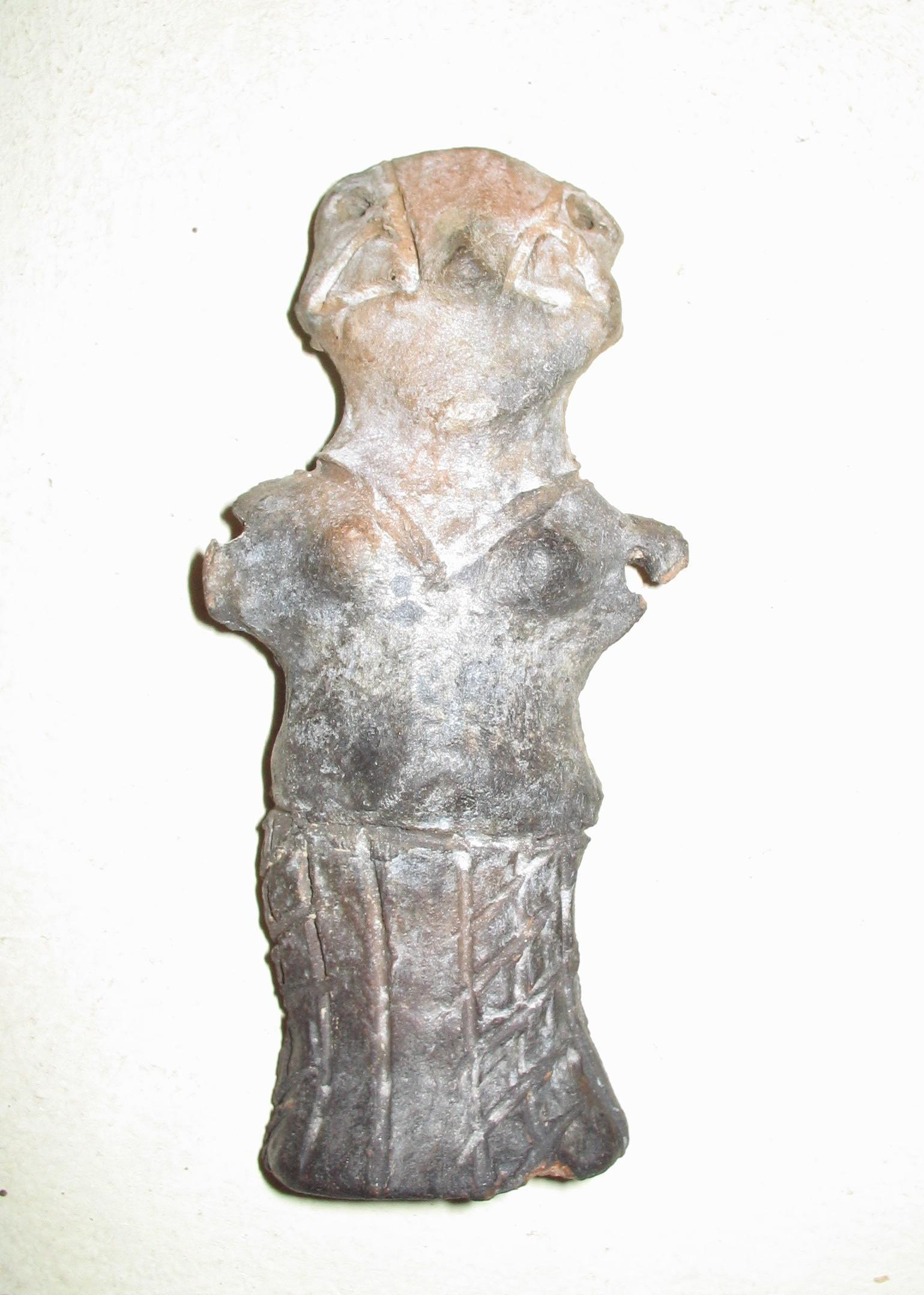
Vinča figurine depicting a skirt

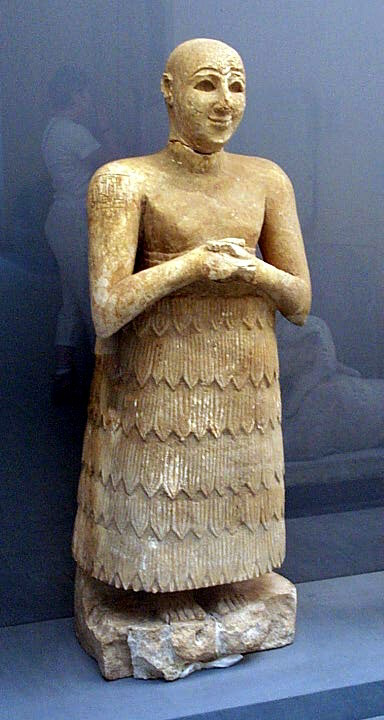
Sumerian man wearing a kaunakes, c. 3000 BC

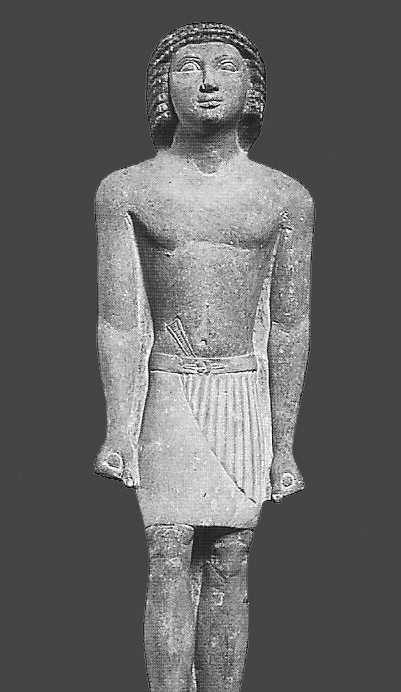
Statue of Ramaat, an official from Giza wearing a pleated Egyptian kilt, c. 2250 BC

Ancient Egyptian garments were mainly made of linen. For the upper classes, they were beautifully woven and intricately pleated. Around 2130 BC, during the Old Kingdom of Egypt, men wore wraparound skirts (kilts) known as the shendyt. They were made of a rectangular piece of cloth wrapped around the lower body and tied in front. By the Middle Kingdom of Egypt, longer skirts, reaching from the waist to ankles and sometimes hanging from the armpits, became fashionable. During the New Kingdom of Egypt, kilts with a pleated triangular section became fashionable for men. Beneath these, a shente, or triangular loincloth whose ends were fastened with cord ties, was worn.

During the Bronze Age, in the Southern parts of Western and Central Europe, wraparound dress-like garments were preferred. However, in Northern Europe, people also wore skirts and blouses.

=== Early modern history ===
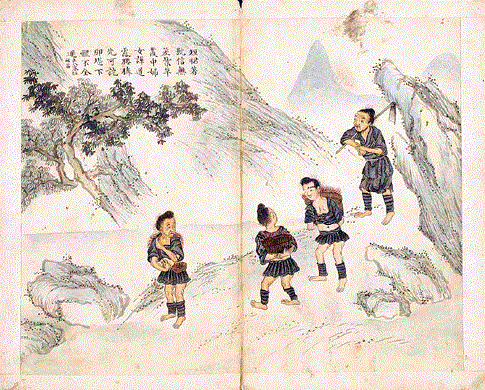
Duan Qun Miao women from a One Hundred Miao Pictures album, pre-1912

In the Middle Ages, men and women preferred dress-like garments. The lower part of men's dresses were much shorter in length compared to those for women. They were wide cut and often pleated or gored so that horse riding was more comfortable. Even a knight's armor had a short metal skirt below the breastplate. It covered the straps attaching the upper legs iron cuisse to the breastplate. Technological advances in weaving in the 13th–15th century, like foot-treadle floor looms and scissors with pivoted blades and handles, improved the tailoring of trousers and tights. They became fashionable for men and henceforth became standard male attire whilst becoming taboo for women.

One of the earliest known cultures to have females wear clothing resembling miniskirts were the Duan Qun Miao (Chinese: 短裙苗), which literally means "Short Skirt Miao". This was in reference to the short miniskirts "that barely cover the buttocks" worn by women of the tribe, and which were probably shocking to observers in premodern and early modern times.

In the Middle Ages, some upper-class women wore skirts over three meters in diameter at the bottom. At the other extreme, the miniskirts of the 1960s were minimal garments that may have barely covered the underwear when the woman was seated. Costume historians typically use the word "petticoat" to describe skirt-like garments of the 18th century or earlier.

=== 19th century ===
The Evolution of the Skirt, Harry Julius, 1916

During the 19th century, the cut of women's dresses in western culture varied more widely than in any other century. Waistlines started just below the bust (the Empire silhouette) and gradually sank to the natural waist. Skirts started fairly narrow and increased dramatically to the hoopskirt and crinoline-supported styles of the 1860s; then fullness was draped and drawn to the back by means of bustles. In the 1890s, the rainy daisy skirt was introduced for walking or sportswear. It had a significantly shorter hemline, measuring as much as six inches off the ground, and eventually influenced the wider introduction of shorter hemlines in the early 20th century.

In the 19th century, in the United States and United Kingdom, there was a movement against skirts as part of the Victorian dress reform movement, and in the United States, the National Dress Reform Association. There was also the invention of different ways to wear skirts. For example, in 1851, early women's rights advocate Elizabeth Smith Miller introduced Amelia Bloomer to a garment initially known as the "Turkish dress", which featured a knee-length skirt over Turkish-style pantaloons. Bloomer came to advocate and promote the dress, including instructions for making it, in The Lily, a newspaper dedicated to the "Emancipation of Woman from Intemperance, Injustice, Prejudice, and Bigotry". This inspired a craze for the dress, which came to be known as bloomers. Elizabeth Cady Stanton, Susan B. Anthony, and Lucy Stone, other early advocates for women's rights, also adopted this style of dress in the 1850s, referring to it as the "freedom dress". Concurrently, some female labourers, notably the pit brow women working at coal pits in the Wigan area, began wearing trousers beneath a short skirt as a practical component of their uniform. This attracted the attention of the public, and various photographers produced records of the women's unconventional manner of dress through the mid to late 19th century.

=== 20th and 21st centuries ===
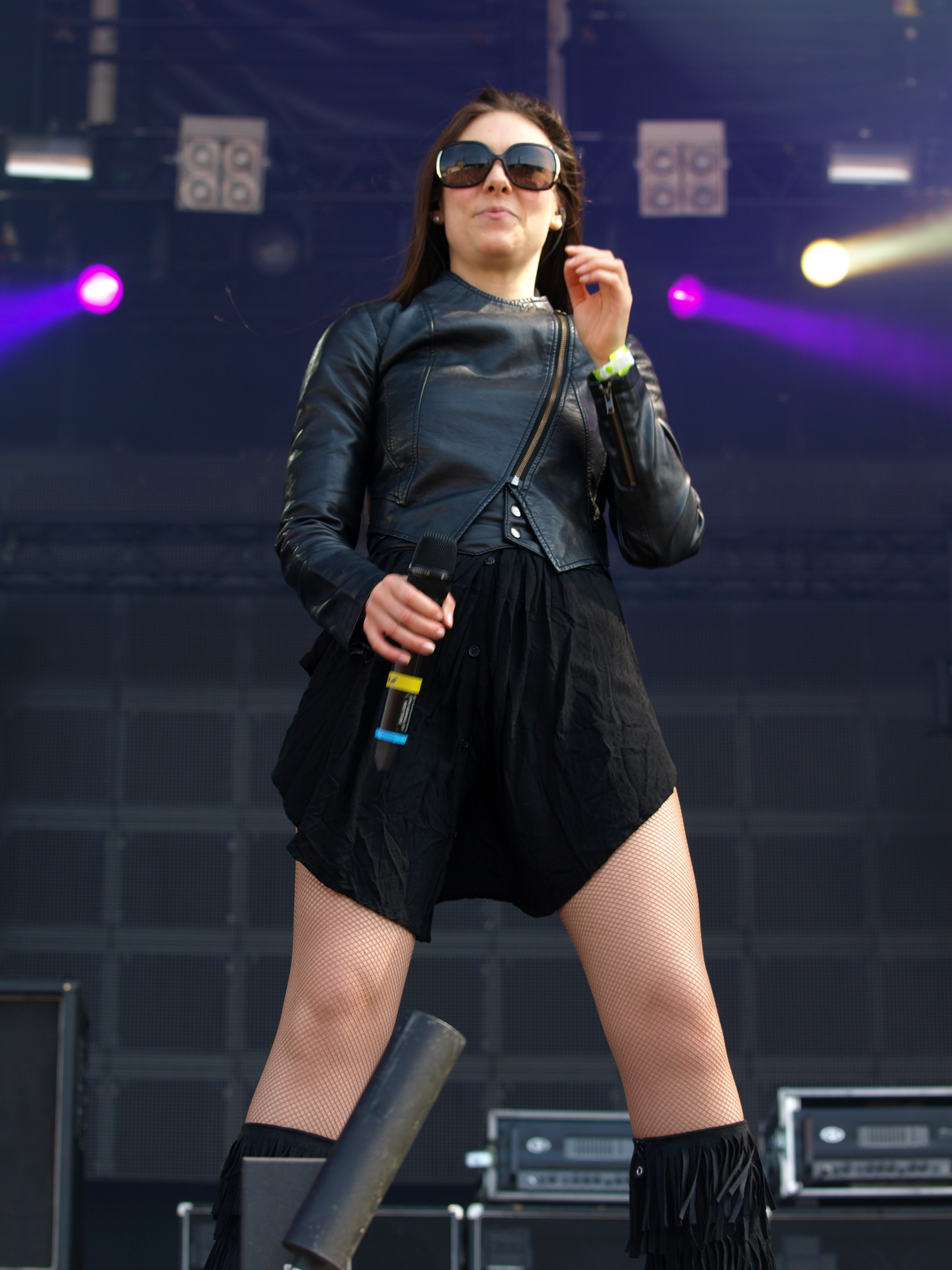
A 21st-century skirt

After 1915, ankle-length skirts were not generally worn in the daytime. For the next fifty years fashionable skirts became short (1920s), then long (1930s), then shorter (in the War Years with their restrictions on fabric), then long (the "New Look"), then shortest of all from 1967 to 1970, when skirts became as short as possible while avoiding exposure of underwear, which was considered taboo.

Since the 1970s and the rise of pants/trousers for women as an option for all but the most formal of occasions, no one skirt length has dominated fashion for long, with short and ankle-length styles often appearing side by side in fashion magazines and catalogs.

Fashion designers such as Jean Paul Gaultier, Vivienne Westwood, Kenzo and Marc Jacobs have also shown men's skirts. Transgressing social codes, Gaultier frequently introduces the skirt into his men's wear collections as a means of injecting novelty into male attire, most famously the sarong seen on David Beckham.

== Styles ==
=== Lengths ===
Image	Name	Description
	Maxi skirt	An ankle-length daytime skirt, popular with women in the late 1960s as a reaction against miniskirts.
	Midi skirt	A skirt with hem halfway between ankle and knee, below the widest part of the calf. Popularized by designers in 1967 as a reaction to very short mini skirts.
	Knee-length skirt	A skirt which approximately reaches the knee.
	Miniskirt	Sometimes hyphenated as mini-skirt, separated as mini skirt, or shortened to simply mini, a miniskirt is a skirt with its hemline well above the knees, generally at mid-thigh level, normally no longer than 10 cm (4 in) below the buttocks.
	Microskirt	A shorter version of the miniskirt, called the microskirt or micro-mini, which emerged toward the end of the 1960s.
	High-low skirt	A skirt with an asymmetrical hemline.

=== Basic types ===
Image	Name	Description
	A-line skirt	A skirt that is fitted at the hips and gradually widens towards the hem, giving the impression of the shape of a capital letter A.
	Bell-shaped skirt	A bell-shaped skirt, flared noticeably from the waist but then, unlike a church bell, cylindrical for much of its length.
	Circle skirt	A skirt cut in sections to make one or more circles with a hole for the waist, so the skirt is very full but hangs smoothly from the waist without darts, pleats, or gathers.
	Culottes	A form of divided skirt, split skirt, or pantskirt constructed like a pair of shorts, but hanging like a skirt.
	Full skirt	A skirt with fullness gathered into the waistband.
	Gored skirt	A skirt that fits through the waistline and flares at the hem. May be made from four to twenty-four shaped sections. Dates from the 14th century and much used in the 19th century. Very popular in the late 1860s, mid-1890s, early 20th century, 1930s, 1940s, and now worn as a classic skirt style.
	Inverted pleated skirt	A skirt made by bringing two folds of fabric to a center line in front and/ or back. May be cut straight at sides or be slightly flared. Has been a basic type of skirt since the 1920s.
	Pleated skirt	A skirt with regular pleats or folds, which can be stitched flat to hip-level or free-hanging.
	Slit skirt/Split skirt	A skirt that has one or more slits (or splits).
	Pencil skirt	A slim-fitting skirt with a straight, narrow cut. Generally the hem falls to, or is just below, the knee and is tailored for a close fit. It is named for its shape: long and slim like a pencil.
	Underskirt	Simple, basic skirt over which an overskirt, or drapery, hangs.
	Wrap or wraparound skirt	A skirt that wraps around the waist with an overlap of material.

=== Some non-basic types ===
Image	Name	Description
	Ballerina skirt	Also referred to as a Juliet skirt or a romance skirt, it is a full skirt that is worn by ballet dancers and is composed of multiple layers of fabric. Ballet dancers wear the longer version of the skirt, while for fashion purposes the skirt is worn shorter, like a mini skirt for better dancing, the cocktail version.
	Broomstick skirt	A light-weight ankle-length skirt with many crumpled pleats formed by compressing and twisting the garment while wet, such as around a broomstick.
	Bubble skirt	Also called a balloon skirt. A voluminous skirt with a hem that is tucked back under to create a "bubble effect" at the bottom. Popular in the 1950s, 1980s, and again in the 2010s.
	Cargo skirt	A plain utilitarian skirt with belt loops and numerous large pockets, based on the military style of cargo pants and popularised in the 1990s.
	Dirndl	A skirt in the Bavarian-Austrian dirndl style, made of a straight length of fabric gathered at the waist. The style derives from Tyrolean peasant costume.
	Denim skirt	A skirt made of denim, often designed like 5-pocket jeans, but found in a large variety of styles.
	Godet skirt	A skirt with godets, triangular pieces of fabric inserted upward from the hem to create more fullness. Popular in the 1930s.
	Hobble skirt	A skirt with a narrow enough hem to significantly impede the wearer's stride. It was called a "hobble skirt" because it seemed to hobble any woman as she walked. Hobble skirts were a short-lived fashion trend that peaked between 1908 and 1914.
	Kilt-skirt	A wrap-around skirt with overlapping aprons in front and pleated around the back. Though traditionally designed as women's wear, it is fashioned to mimic the general appearance of a man's kilt.
	Leather skirt	A skirt made of leather.
	Lehenga	Also called Ghagra or Garara. A long, pleated skirt, often embroidered, worn mostly as the bottom part of the Gagra choli in North India and Pakistan.
	Mandala skirt	A skirt with a mandala motif.
	Mini-crini	A mini-length version of the crinoline, designed by Vivienne Westwood in the mid-1980s.
	Poodle skirt	A wide swing felt skirt of a solid color displaying a design appliquéd or transferred to the fabric, created by Juli Lynne Charlot in 1947. The design was often a coiffed poodle. Later substitutes for the poodle patch included flamingoes, flowers, and hot rod cars.
	Puffball skirt	Also called "puff" or "pouf". A bouffant skirt caught in at the hem to create a puffed silhouette. Popular in the mid-late 1980s when it was inspired by Vivienne Westwood’s "mini-crini".
	Rah-rah skirt/Cheerleader skirt	A short, tiered, and often colourful skirt fashionable in the early-mid-1980s.
	Sarong	A square or rectangle of fabric wrapped around the body and tied on one hip to create a skirt that can be worn by both sexes.
	Skort	A skirt with a pair of integral shorts hidden underneath.
	Skater skirt	A short, high-waisted circle skirt with a hemline above the knee, often made of lighter materials to give the flowing effect that mimics the skirts of figure skaters.
	Spank skirt	Also called spanking skirt. A skirt that has an additional opening in back designed to expose the buttocks, so that the wearer can be spanked without removing or repositioning the skirt. Considered fetish wear, these kinds of skirts are typically tight-fitting and made of fetishistic materials such as leather, PVC or latex.
	Squaw dress	A one or two piece outfit based on Native American clothing. Fashionable in the 1940s and 1950s.
	Swing skirt	A flared skirt, circular or cut in gores, fitted at hips with a wide flare at the hem. Popular in the late 1930s and at interval since. Very popular in the mid-1980s.
	T-skirt	A skirt made from a tee-shirt. The T-skirt is generally modified to result in a pencil skirt, with invisible zippers, full length two-way separating side zippers, as well as artful fabric overlays and yokes.
	Tiered skirt	A skirt made of several horizontal layers, each wider than the one above, and divided by stitching. Layers may look identical in solid-colored garments, or may differ when made of printed fabrics.
	Prairie skirt	Variant of a tiered skirt, a flared skirt with one or more flounces or tiers (1970s and on).
	Trouser skirt	A straight skirt with the part above the hips tailored like men's trousers, with belt loops, pockets, and fly front.
	Tulip skirt	A skirt wrapped over at its front and that bears angled ends which make it form a tulip shape.

== Male wear ==
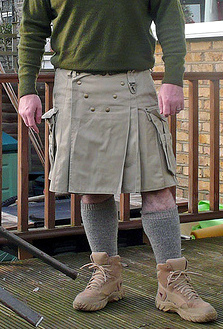
A man wearing a Utilikilt, 2010

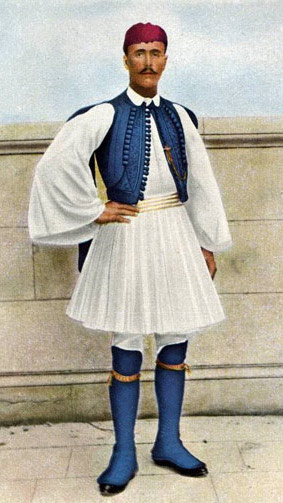
A man wearing a fustanella

There are a number of garments marketed to men which fall under the category of "skirt" or "dress". These go by a variety of names and form part of the traditional dress for men from various cultures. Usage varies – the dhoti is part of everyday dress on the Indian subcontinent while the kilt is more usually restricted to occasional wear and the fustanella is used almost exclusively as costume. Robes, which are a type of dress for men, have existed in a number of cultures, including the Japanese kimono, the Chinese cheongsam, the Arabic thobe, and the African Senegalese kaftan. Robes are also used in some religious orders, such as the cassock in Christianity and various robes and cloaks that may be used in pagan rituals. Examples of men's skirts and skirt-like garments from various cultures include:

- The fustanella is a full-pleated skirt worn by men in Albania and Greece and other parts of the Balkans. By the mid-20th century, it was relegated to ceremonial use and as period or traditional costume. It is worn by the Evzones, or Evzoni (Greek: Εύζωνες, Εύζωνοι, pronounced [evˈzones, evˈzoni]), which is the name of several historical elite light infantry and mountain units of the Greek Army. Today, it refers to the members of the Presidential Guard who parade the presidential mansion wearing a short version of this historic costume.
- The gho is a knee-length robe worn by men in Bhutan. They are required to wear it every day as part of national dress in government offices, in schools and on formal occasions.
- The hakama is worn in Japan. There are two types of hakama, divided umanori (馬乗り, "horse-riding hakama") and undivided andon hakama (行灯袴, "lantern hakama"). The umanori type has wide and divided legs, similar to culottes. Some hakamas are pleated.
- The kilt is a skirt of Gaelic and Celtic history, part of the Scottish national dress in particular, and is worn formally and to a lesser extent informally. Irish and Welsh kilts also exist but are not so much a part of national identity.
- The sarong is a piece of cloth that may be wrapped around the waist to form a skirt-like garment. Sarongs exist in various cultures under various names, including the pareo and lavalava of the Hawaiian islands and Polynesia (Samoa, Tonga, Tahiti, and Fiji), the Indian dhoti and lungi, and the South Indian and Maldivian mundu.

Aside from the wearing of kilts, in the Western world skirts, dresses, and similar garments are generally viewed exclusively as women's clothing which, historically, was not always the case. However, some Western men have taken up skirts as forms of civil protest. Other Western men advocate skirts as a measure of co-equality between women and men.

== Norms and policies ==
The skirt is a part of uniforms for girls in schools around the world, with lengths varying depending on local culture. The pleated tartan skirt began as a component of girls' school uniforms in the early twentieth century in the United Kingdom. Most UK schools now allow girls to wear trousers, but many girls still wear skirts in primary and secondary schools, even where the choice of trousers is given. In the late 20th and early 21st century, many schools began changing their uniform rules to allow trousers for girls amidst opposition to skirts-only policies. Although it is commonly accepted that girls may wear trousers to school, no test case is known to have been brought before the courts, making the legal position uncertain on requiring skirts as part of girls' uniforms. The rule is still enforced in many schools, particularly independent and selective state schools. In fact, United Kingdom government guidelines expressly state the decision of allowing girls to wear trousers is with individual schools. In June 1999, University Professor Claire Hale took legal action against Whickham School when they refused permission to allow her daughter Jo Hale to wear trousers. Amongst others, the Equal Opportunities Commission decided to back the case. On 24 February 2000 the school avoided a legal battle by announcing that, in future, girls would be able to wear trousers.

In the 1980s in Puerto Rico, Ana Irma Rivera Lassén was not allowed to enter court in trousers and was told to wear a skirt. She sued the judge and won.

In 2022, the United States Court of Appeals for the Fourth Circuit ruled against the Charter Day School in North Carolina, which had required girls to wear skirts due to the idea that girls are "fragile vessels" deserving "gentle" treatment from boys. The court ruled the requirement was unconstitutional.

Since 2004, the International Skating Union has allowed women to wear trousers instead of skirts in competition if they wish.

== Dancing ==
Many forms of dancing require women to wear skirts or dresses, either by convention or competition rules. In Scottish highland dancing, for example, women wear the Aboyne dress, which actually involves a skirt, for the national dances, and wear a kilt-based outfit for the Highland dances.

== See also ==
- Hakama
- Qun
- Sampot
- Sulu
- Trousers
- Trousers as women's clothing
- Victorian dress reform
