= Carpenter jeans =

Style of Pants

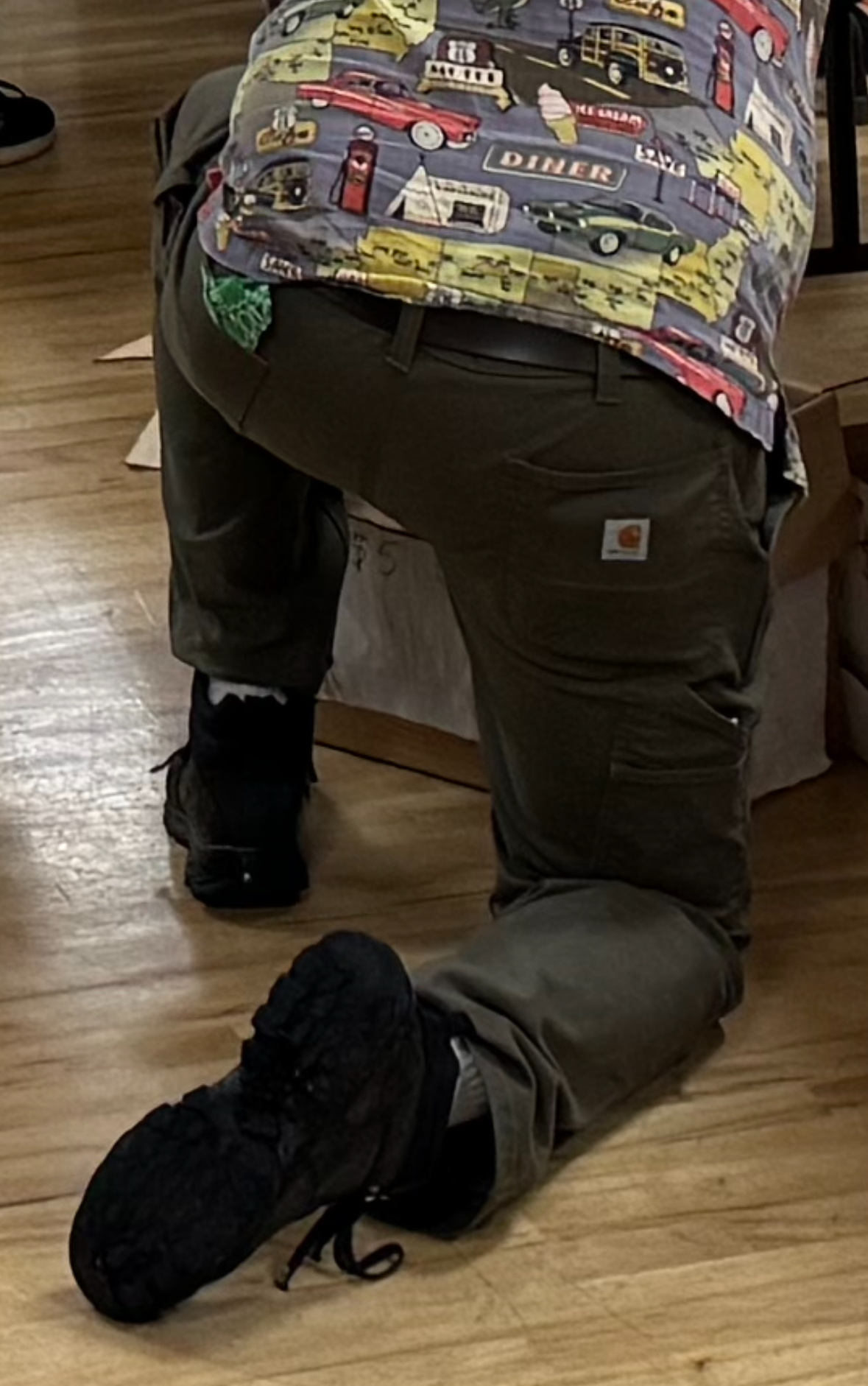
Carhartt Carpenter Pants on a Man Kneeling at a show

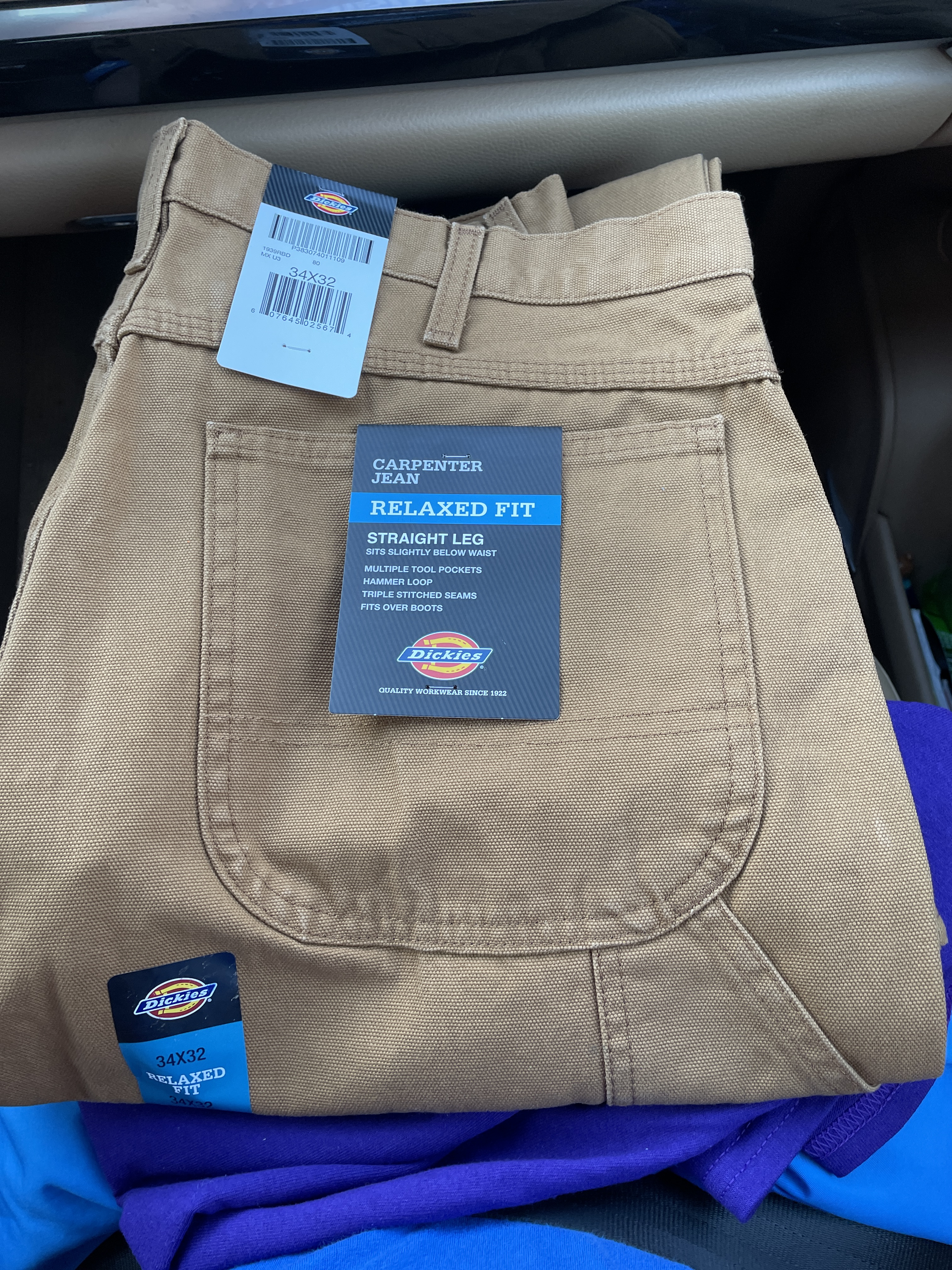

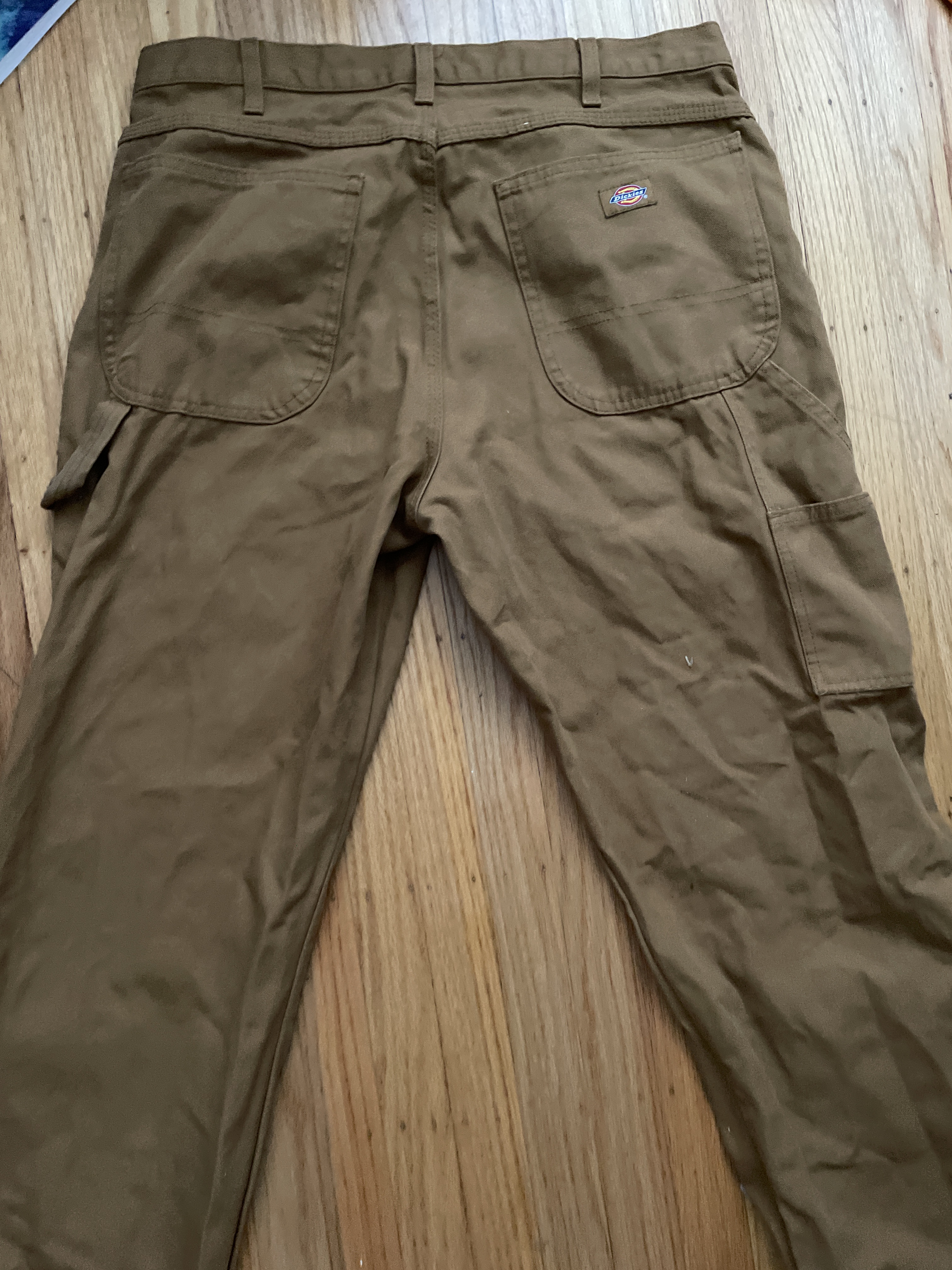
Brown Carpenter Jeans from Dickies

Carpenter jeans are jeans with many pockets and loops which can be used to carry objects such as tools and are often loose around the leg to be able to accommodate the affixed items. They are often worn by construction workers and carpenters, hence the name, to carry their tools so that their hands can be kept free yet the tools are still easily accessible.

== Characteristics ==
Carpenter jeans are usually made of denim or canvas, and colors may vary; brown and blue are popular colors. A 'hammer loop' is usually located on the left leg; although this was originally designed with the intention of allowing carpenters to carry tools without the need for a tool belt, most carpenters do not use the loop, because the hammer often falls out or bangs around the leg. Other features include extra pockets, sometimes located on the outer thighs, some might have built-in knee pads for extra safety, and extra rivets for durability. Another feature is wider belt loops, to accommodate a wider, thicker belt because of the weight of the tools carried in the pockets and loops.

Most carpenter jeans are made for function, not fashion, and are usually of a softer denim; some might be covered in fleece on the inside. Carpenter jeans are more comfortable than the original utilitarian jeans, with a looser fit. Carpenter jeans were quite popular in the late 1990s and early 2000s hip hop scene especially those sold by Tommy Hilfiger who placed their trademark logo on the hammer loop.

== See also ==
- Cargo pants
- Tactical pants
