= ZFX Inc. =

US performer-flying-effects company

- Company type: Private
- Industry: Theater; Special Effects; Flying Harnesses; Automation; Black Wire Rope
- Founded: Las Vegas, Nevada; Incorporated February 7, 1995
- Headquarters: Louisville, Kentucky
- Number of locations: Utrecht, the Netherlands
- Area served: Worldwide
- Number of employees: 50 (2011)
- Website: zfxflying.com

ZFX Inc., commonly known as ZFX Flying, is a performer-flying-effects company based in Louisville, Kentucky, and Utrecht, the Netherlands. The company name is pronounced "Zee Eff Eks" (using the American English pronunciation of the letter Z). Founded in Las Vegas in 1994 it has provided flying effects for hundreds of professional and amateur versions of Peter Pan and the Wizard of Oz. and Broadway productions such as Wicked.

Its flying directors are known for wearing the Utilikilt as the official company uniform. It has the most E.T.C.P double certified (Theater and Arena) riggers of any employer.

In 2010 they branched out from flying performers in live productions to also flying mannequins in retail stores. Starting with the Uniqlo flagship store in Shanghai they worked with the architectural firm Bohlin Cywinski Jackson in making multiple mannequins flying in a 20-meter atrium and an overhead carousel of rotating mannequins in acrylic pods. Those concepts helped Bohlin Cywinski Jackson to win the EuroShop RetailDesign award in 2012.

The company is the largest producer of black-oxide-coated wire rope in the world, producing black wire rope for internal use and also for the majority of the Cirque du Soleil shows.

It is also known for its collection of antique industrial and entertainment rigging including Nicopress tools and the oldest known working CM Lodestar.
