= Tactical pants =

Trousers with versatile modifications

Tactical pants are trousers with versatile modifications intended for everyday workwear for civil defense, emergency medical technicians, fire service professionals, plainclothes law enforcement officers (e.g. FBI agents, undercover special police such as SWAT), security guards, intelligence agencies and military/paramilitary personnel (particularly private contractors). They are closely related to cargo pants but are typically solid in color.

Tactical pants were originally worn by mountain climbers as more durable outdoor apparel, but are now available in different styles. Various styles use arrangements such as lower leg straps for stealth, additional pockets for storage, and are reinforced with bar tacks, gussets, knee pad inserts and certain brands are coated with Teflon.
