= Godet (sewing) =

Circular sector of fabric set into a garment

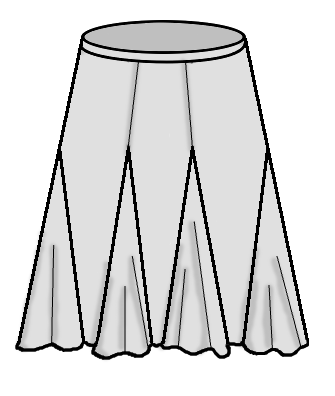
A skirt with godets on the seams.

A godet (/ɡoʊˈdeɪ/ or /ɡoʊˈdɛt/) is an extra piece of fabric in the shape of a circular sector which is set into a garment, usually a dress or skirt. The addition of a godet causes the article of clothing in question to flare, thus adding width and volume. The most popular use of godets is in petticoats. Adding a godet to a piece of clothing also gives the wearer a wider range of motion.

== See also ==
- Gore (fabrics)
- Gusset
- Pleat
