= Cargo pants =

Loosely cut trousers

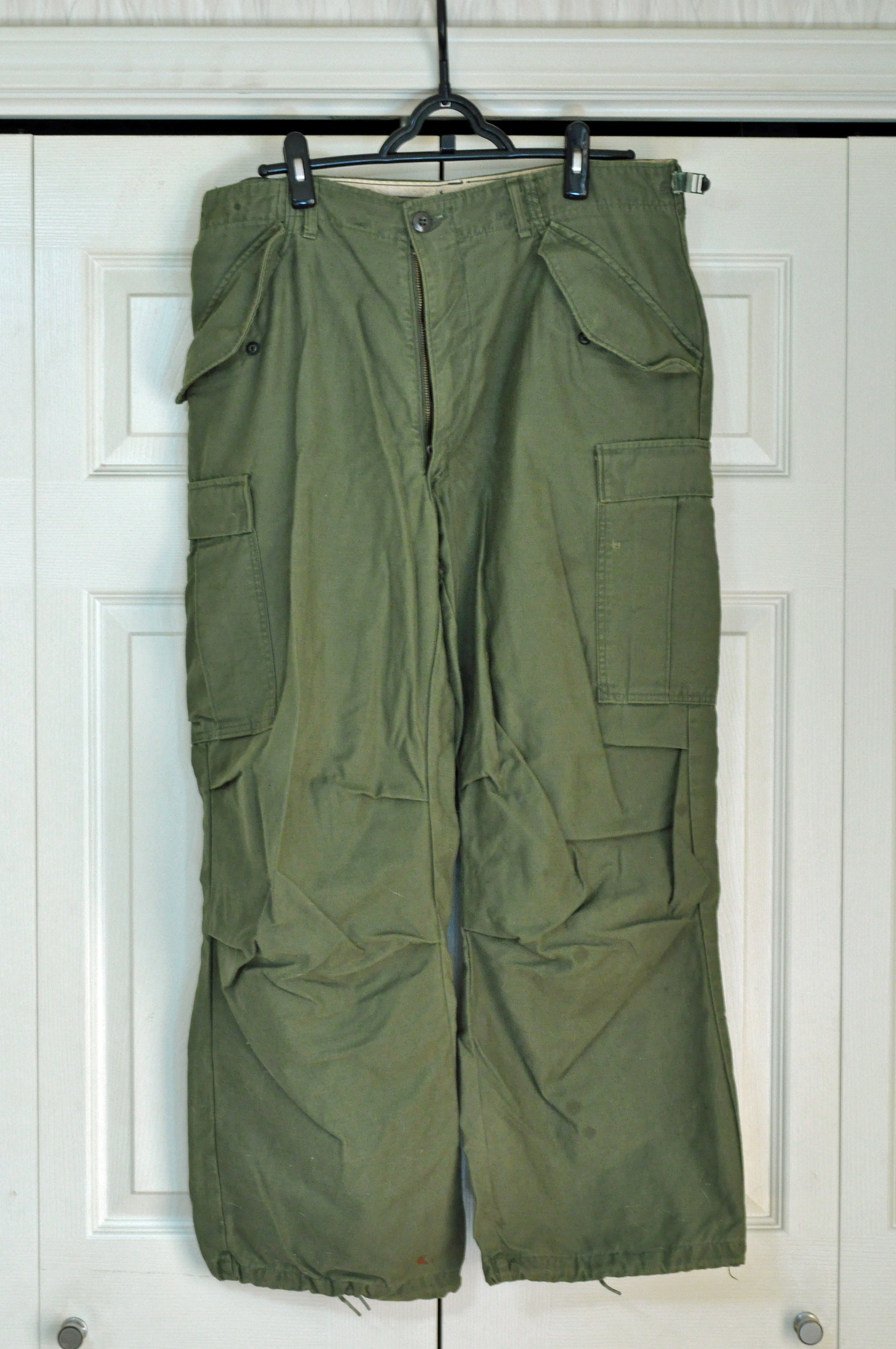
Pair of cargo pants

Cargo pants or cargo trousers, also sometimes called combat pants or combat trousers after their original purpose as military workwear, are loosely cut pants originally designed for rough work environments and outdoor activities, distinguished by numerous large utility pockets.

Cargo shorts are a short version of the cargo pants, with the legs usually extending down to near-knee lengths.

Both cargo pants and shorts have since become popular as urban casual wear, since they are loose-fitting and quite convenient for carrying extra items.

== Description ==
A cargo pocket is a form of a patch pocket, often bellowed to increase capacity, and closed with a flap secured by a button, snap, Velcro, or magnet common on battledress, hunting, and sporting clothing. In some designs, cargo pockets may be hidden within the legs.

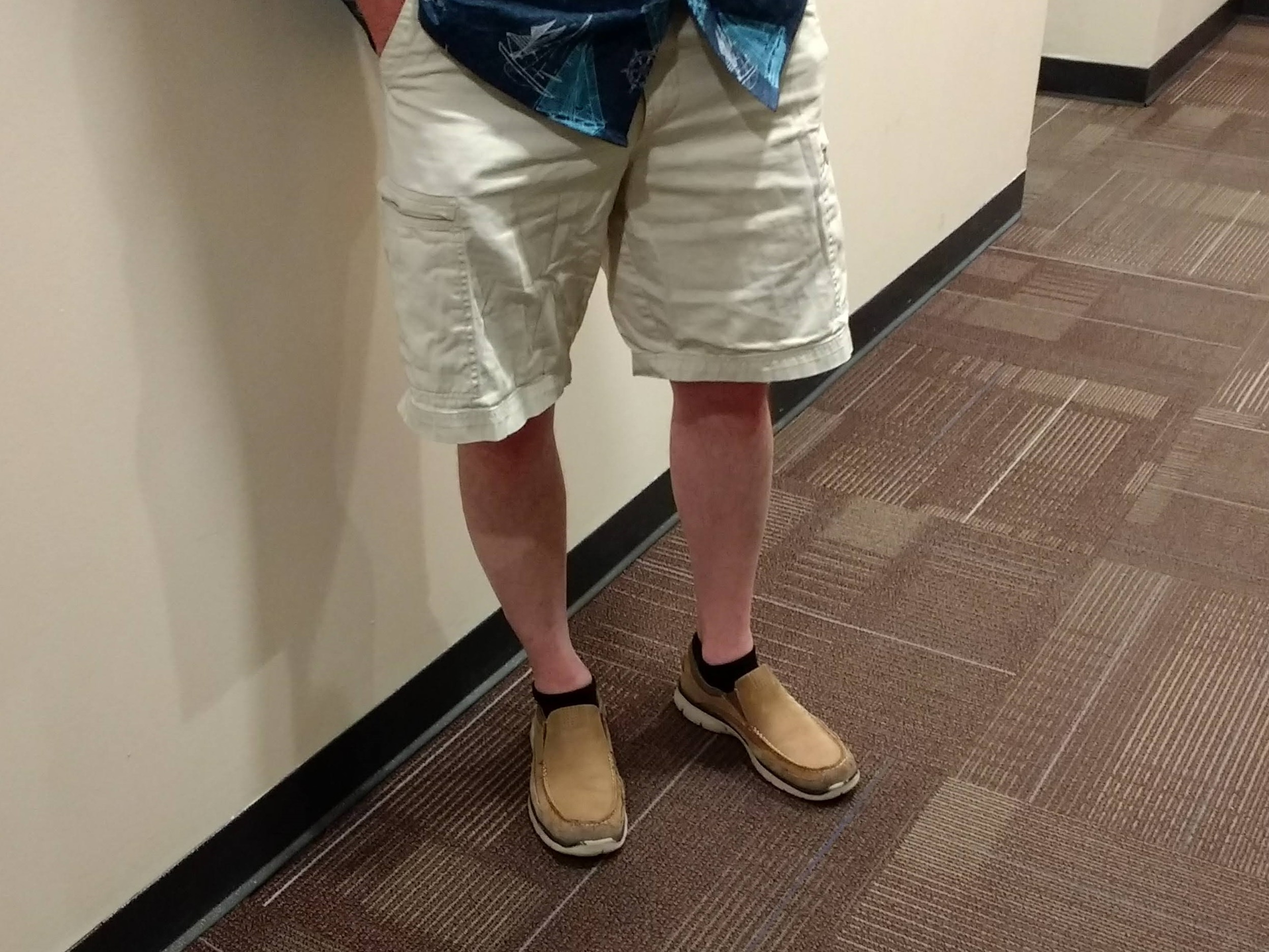
Khaki-colored cargo shorts in an office setting

Cargo pants are made of hard-wearing fabric and ruggedly stitched. Increasingly they are made of quick-drying synthetic or cotton-synthetic blends, and often feature oversized belt loops to accommodate wide webbing belts.

The garments are characteristically designed to allow bending at the knee and hip, and are sewn with felled seams for strength and durability.

== History ==
Battle dress was first worn by members of the British Armed Forces in 1938, and was introduced to the United States in the mid-1940s during World War II. The large pockets characteristic of cargo pants were originally designed for British forces to hold field dressings, maps, and other items. The concept was copied in the U.S. paratrooper uniform to allow more room to hold K rations and extra ammunition. Cargo pants were a popular fashion trend in the early 2000s. They have enjoyed renewed popularity in the 2020s as part of the 'Y2K' fashion trend, where 2000s fashion trends have been brought back into fashion.

== Variations ==
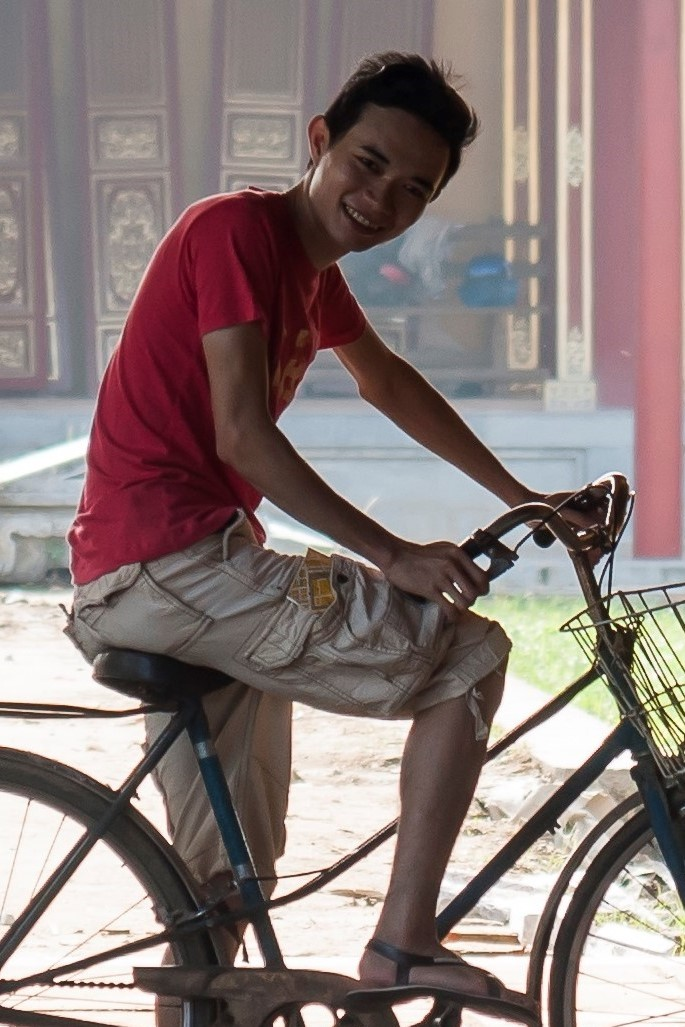
Young man wearing cargo shorts, Vietnam, 2010

=== Cargo shorts ===
Cargo shorts are cargo pants shortened at the knee. Some cargo pants are made with removable lower legs allowing conversion into shorts.

In 1980, cargo shorts were marketed as ideal for the sportsman or fisherman, with the pocket flaps ensuring that pocket contents were secure and unlikely to fall out. By the mid-to-late 1990s, cargo shorts found popularity among mainstream men's fashion.

=== EMT pants ===
EMT pants are cargo pants with six pockets on one or both legs, each with a zippered pocket on top of the cargo pocket, a wide pocket with a flap with increased carrying capacity, besom pockets on calves for glove storage, and three pockets for scissors (two fitted with snap closures).

== See also ==
- Carpenter jeans
- Tactical pants
