= Gore (fabrics) =

Triangular piece of cloth used in dress making or hat making

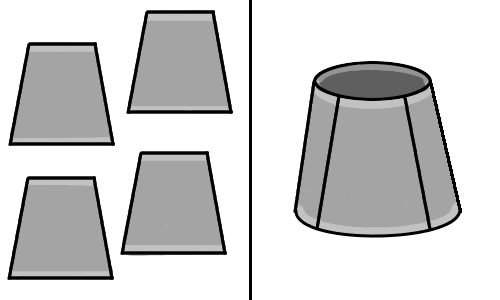
Four trapezoidal gores make a skirt

In clothing and similar applications, a gore is a triangular or trapezoidal piece of a textile as might be used in shaping a garment to fit contours of the body.

The word is derived from Old English gār, meaning spear. In the course of time the word came to be used for a piece of cloth used in making clothes. In dressmaking and hatmaking, it refers to triangular or rhomboid pieces of fabric which are combined to create a fuller three dimensional effect. In knitting gloves and mittens, a "thumb gore" is often incorporated from the wrist part way to the tip of the thumb to accommodate the gradually increasing width of the hand.

The part of a bra that links the two bra cups is called the "centre gore".

== See also ==
- Gusset
- Godet (sewing)
