= Qumbaz =

Traditional Levantine robe

Qumbaz قُمْبَاز
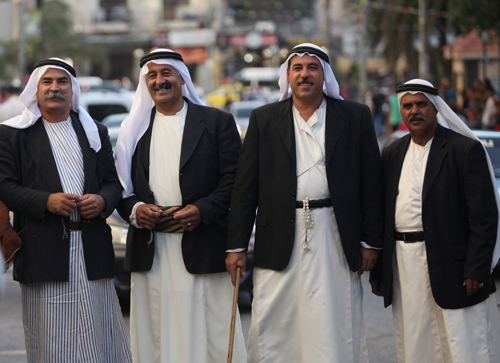
- Palestinian men wearing traditional qumbaz garments
- Type: Traditional Levantine men's robe
- Material: Cotton, linen, wool, and silk
- Place of origin: the Levant

A qumbaz (Arabic: قُمباز) is a traditional long coat or robe that is historically worn by men in parts of the Levant, particularly Palestine, Syria, and Lebanon. It is an ankle-length outer garment with narrow sleeves and a rounded neckline, traditionally made from textiles such as cotton, wool, or silk, and often features striped patterns.

== History ==
The Qumbaz was historically a significant garment worn by men in the Levant, particularly in rural and urban communities. It formed part of traditional men's dress in regions including Palestine, Syria, Jordan and Lebanon, where it was worn alongside garments such as sashes and belts, along with traditional head coverings. The garment was associated with traditional identity, and it developed according to the availability of materials, season, and occasion. Everyday versions were often made from cotton or linen, while finer garments were made from silk and worn for more significant occasions.

During the 20th century, the use of the Qumbaz declined as modern clothing became more widespread, especially in urban areas. Today, it is mainly preserved as part of Levantine cultural heritage and appears in traditional events and amongst some communities, particularly in rural areas.

== Etymology ==
Research into the origin of the word qumbaz shows that some consider its formal Arabic equivalent to be qaba' (القباء). Dozy, in his dictionary Supplement to the Arabic dictionaries, described the qumbaz as a type of qaba', a wide garment with sleeves worn by men. The Arabic term itself is considered by some sources to be derived from Persian, referring to a garment that is open at the front.

The use of the term qumbaz developed across the Levant, where it became associated with different regional names and variations of the garment. In some areas, related forms were used to describe specific styles or types of the robe, reflecting differences in local clothing traditions and dialects.

== Design and manufacture ==
The Qumbaz is a long robe that is similar in appearance to the jellabiya, but it distinguished by being open at the front, narrow at the upper section, and gradually widening toward the bottom. The two front sides overlap and are fastened together with ties, with the collar often decorated with covered buttons. Its construction varied according to season, with summer varieties made from lighter fabrics such as linen, while winter garments are often made from thicker woolen cloth for warmth.

== Cultural significance ==
The Qumbaz remains an important symbol of traditional Levantine dress and cultural identity. Traditional clothing has been used to represent regional identity, social traditions, status, and historical continuity.

== See also ==
- Thawb
- Sirwal
