= Gusset =

Piece of fabric

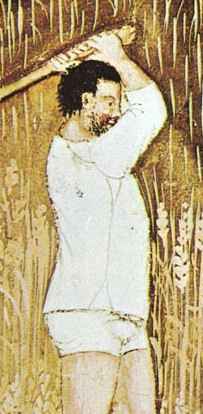
Late medieval shirt with gussets in the seams at shoulder, underarm, and hem. From a copy of the Tacuinum Sanitatis, 14th century.

In sewing, a gusset is a triangular or rhomboidal piece of fabric inserted into a seam to add breadth or reduce stress from tight-fitting clothing. Gussets were used at the shoulders, underarms, and hems of traditional shirts and chemises made of rectangular lengths of linen to shape the garments to the body.

== Applications ==
Gussets are used in manufacturing of modern tights and pantyhose to add breadth at the crotch seam. As with other synthetic underwear, these gussets are often made of moisture-wicking breathable fabrics such as cotton, to keep the genital area dry and ventilated.

Gussets are also used when making three-piece bags, for example in a pattern for a bag as a long, wide piece which connects the front piece and back piece. By becoming the sides and bottom of the bag, the gusset opens the bag up beyond what simply attaching the front to the back would do. With reference to the dimension of the gusset, the measurements of a flat bottom bag may be quoted as L×W×G. Pillows too, are often gusseted, generally an inch or two. The side panels thicken the pillow, allowing more stuffing without bulging.

== Other uses ==
The meaning of gusset has expanded beyond fabric, broadly to denote an added patch of joining material that provides structural support. For example, metal gussets are used in bicycle frames to add strength and rigidity. Gussets may be used in retort pouches and other forms of packaging to allow the package to stand. Gusset plates, usually triangular, are often used to join metal plates and can be seen in many metal framed constructions. Presentation folders or accordion folders may employ gussets to expand when holding more than just a few sheets of paper. The gusset is also a charge in heraldry, as is the gyron (an Old French word for gusset).

== See also ==
- Godet (sewing)
- Gore (fabrics)
- Gusset (heraldry)
