= Sulu (skirt) =

Traditional skirt or kilt of Fiji

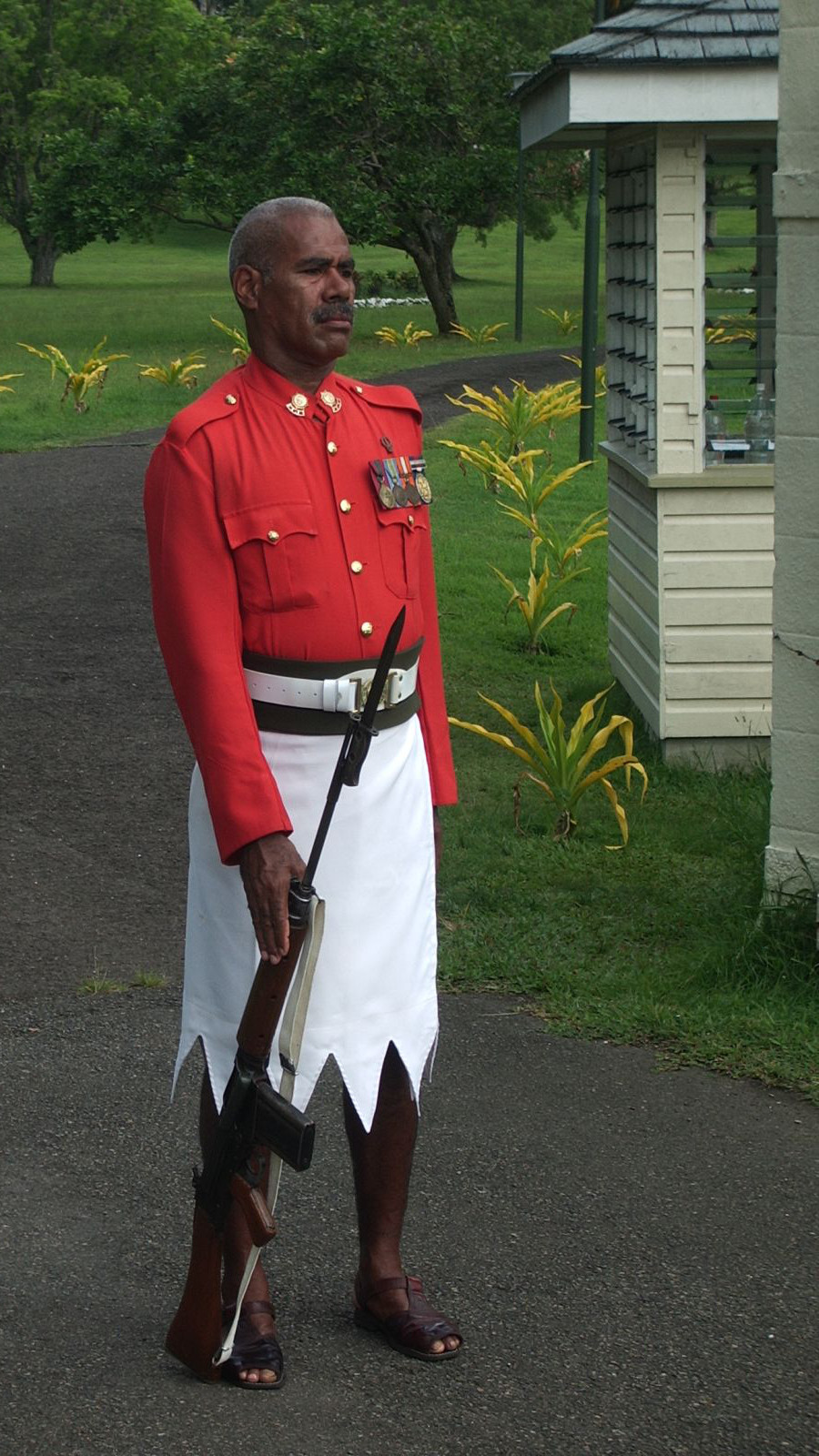
Guard at the Fiji presidential palace

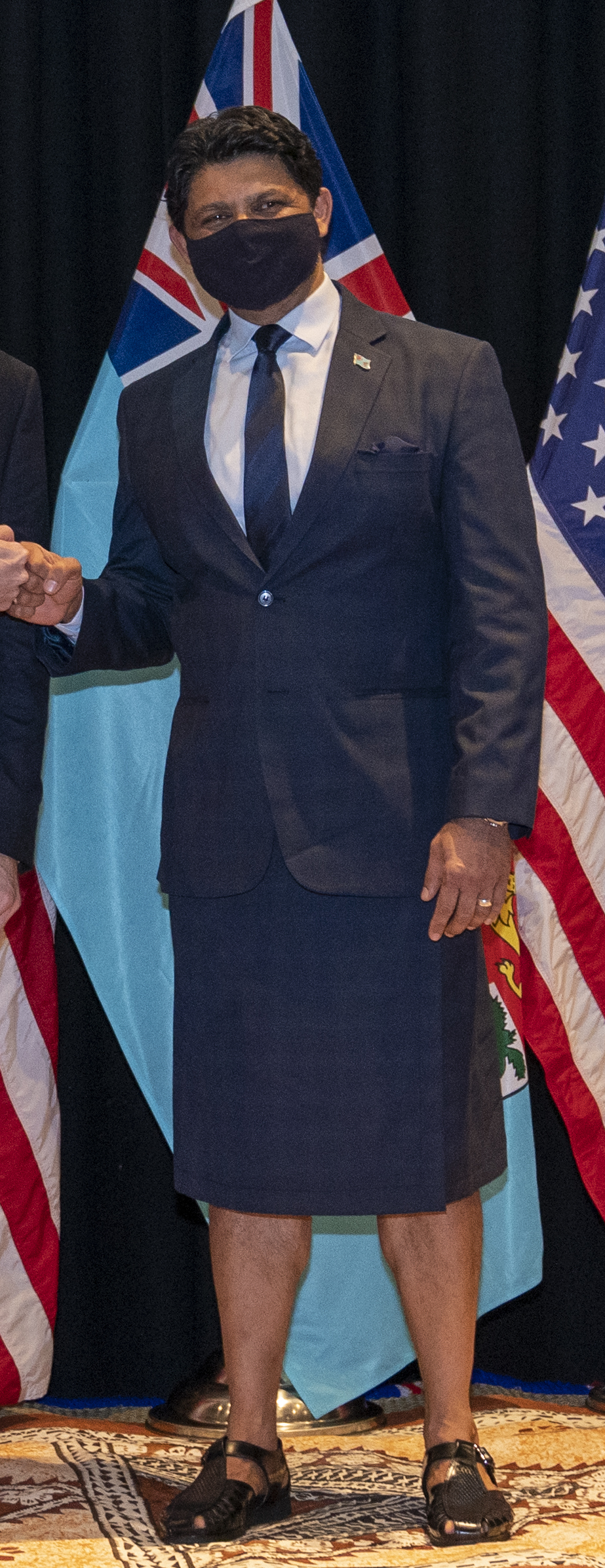
Acting Prime Minister Aiyaz Sayed-Khaiyum at a diplomatic visit

A sulu is a kilt-like garment worn by men and women in Fiji since colonisation in the nineteenth century.

== Etymology ==
The word sulu (pronunciation: soo-loo) literally means clothes or cloth in the iTaukei language.

== Description ==
The first sulus were brought by missionaries coming from Tonga in the nineteenth century and were initially worn by iTaukei Fijians to indicate their conversion to Christianity. It is now regarded as Fiji's national dress even though pre-colonial iTaukei Fijian traditional clothing consisted of loincloth garments such as the malo and the liku.

It consists of a rectangle of cloth of varying length, between below-knee and ankle-length, wrapped around the hips and traditionally fastened by tying at the waist or has an elastic waist. Modern men's sulus may be fastened with buckles. This version of the sulu is believed to have been designed for formal wear by Ratu Sir Lala Sukuna.

The casual or everyday unisex sulus are known as sulu-vaka-toga (meaning Tongan sulu). Together with women's church or formal ceremony dress, simple sulus with an elastic waist that extend to the ankles are known as sulu-i-ra. The more elegant full-length ones for dressy occasions as sulu jaba. Men's sulus are known as sulu vakataga (sulu with pockets).

Tailored sulus with pockets are commonly worn as part of Fijian men's business and formal wear, with shirt and sandals and optionally western-style jacket and tie. In certain situations, such as entering a church, wearing a sulu is seen as respectful. Tailored sulus also feature in police and military uniforms. Official uniform sulus come to below the knees and feature a distinctive zigzag hem.

In Fiji the sulu is seen as an expression of ethnic Fijian identity. While wearing a sulu is often mandatory for Fijians in certain settings, previously, members of other ethnicities were sometimes discouraged from wearing it.
