= Kaunakes =

Woollen skirt or cloak worn around 2,500 BC

A kaunakes (Note: Sometimes spelled kaunakès, as in French. (Ancient Greek: καυνάκης, romanized: kaunákēs, or γαυνάκης; Classical Syriac: ܓܘܢܟܐ, romanized: gawnɘḵā; Akkadian: 𒌆𒄖𒅘𒆪 ^{TÚG}GU-NAK-KU; or persis; or Latin: gaunaca or gausapa)) was a woollen mantle that originated in Sumer. It was woven in a tufted pattern, suggesting overlapping petals or feathers by sewing tufts onto the garment or looping them into the fabric.

== Background ==
=== Pre-Dynastic period (4000-2700 BC): kilts and "net-dresses" ===
The earliest type of dress attested in early Sumerian art is not the kaunakes, but rather a kilt or "net dress" which quite closely fits the lower body, while the upper body remains bare. This early net dress looks much more similar to standard textile than the later kaunakes, which look more like sheepskin with ample bell-shaped volume around the waist and the legs.

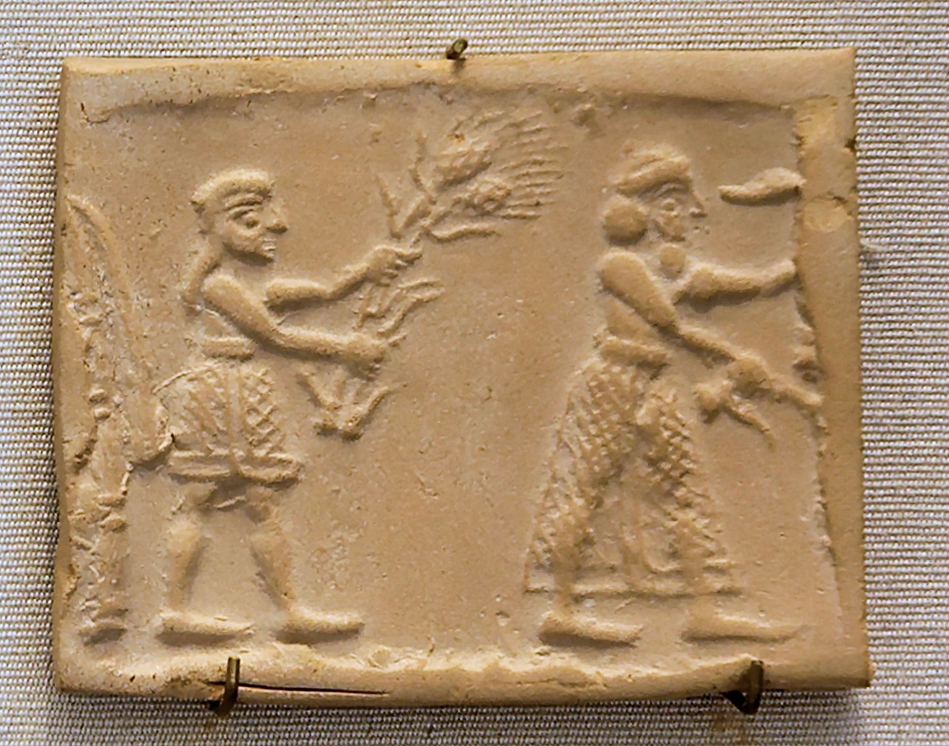
Clay impression of a cylinder seal from Uruk, with "net-dress", 3100 BC

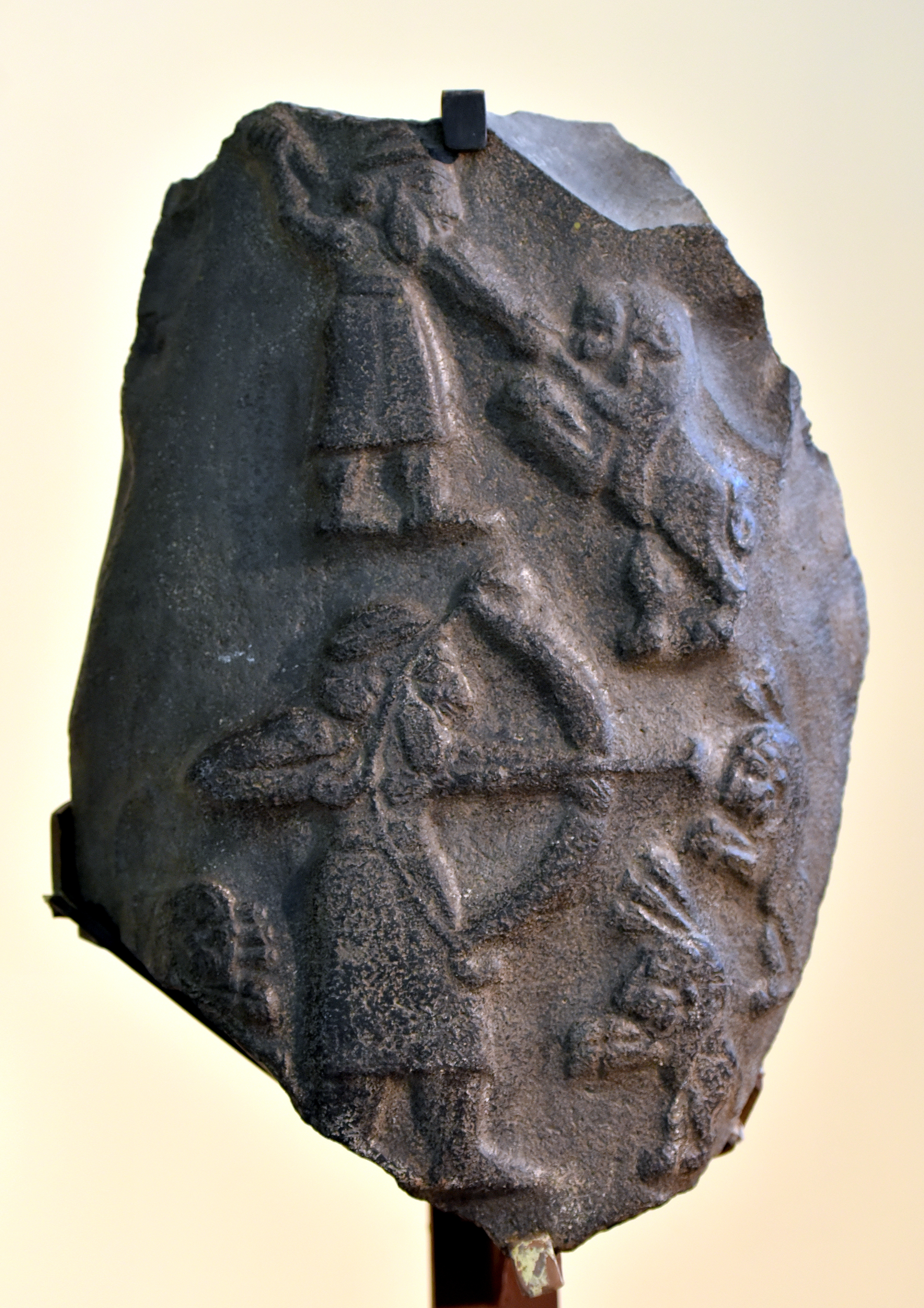
Kilts being worn on the Stele of the lion hunt (3000-2900 BC)

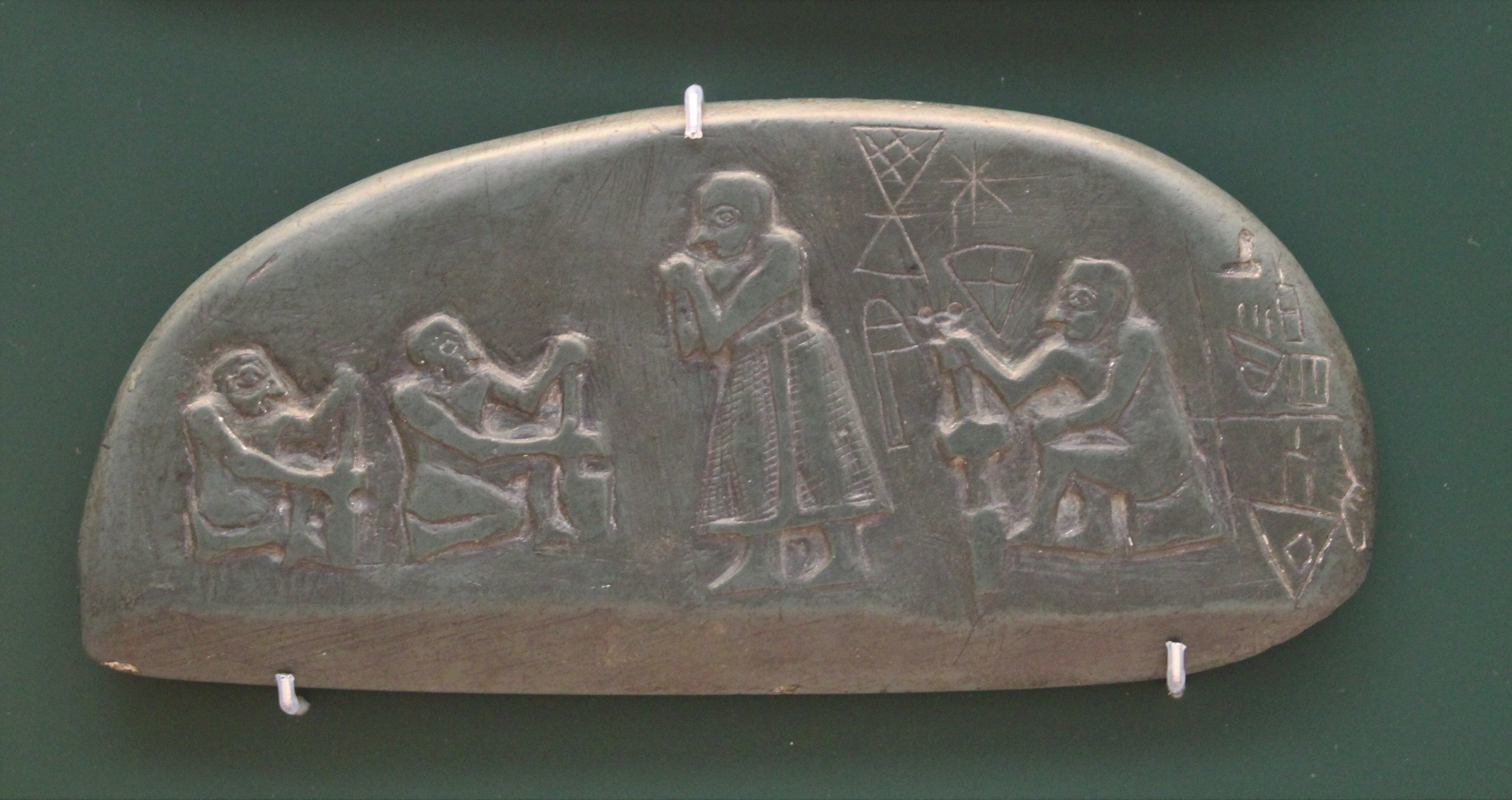
A "net dress" being worn on the Blau Monuments (3000-2900 BC)

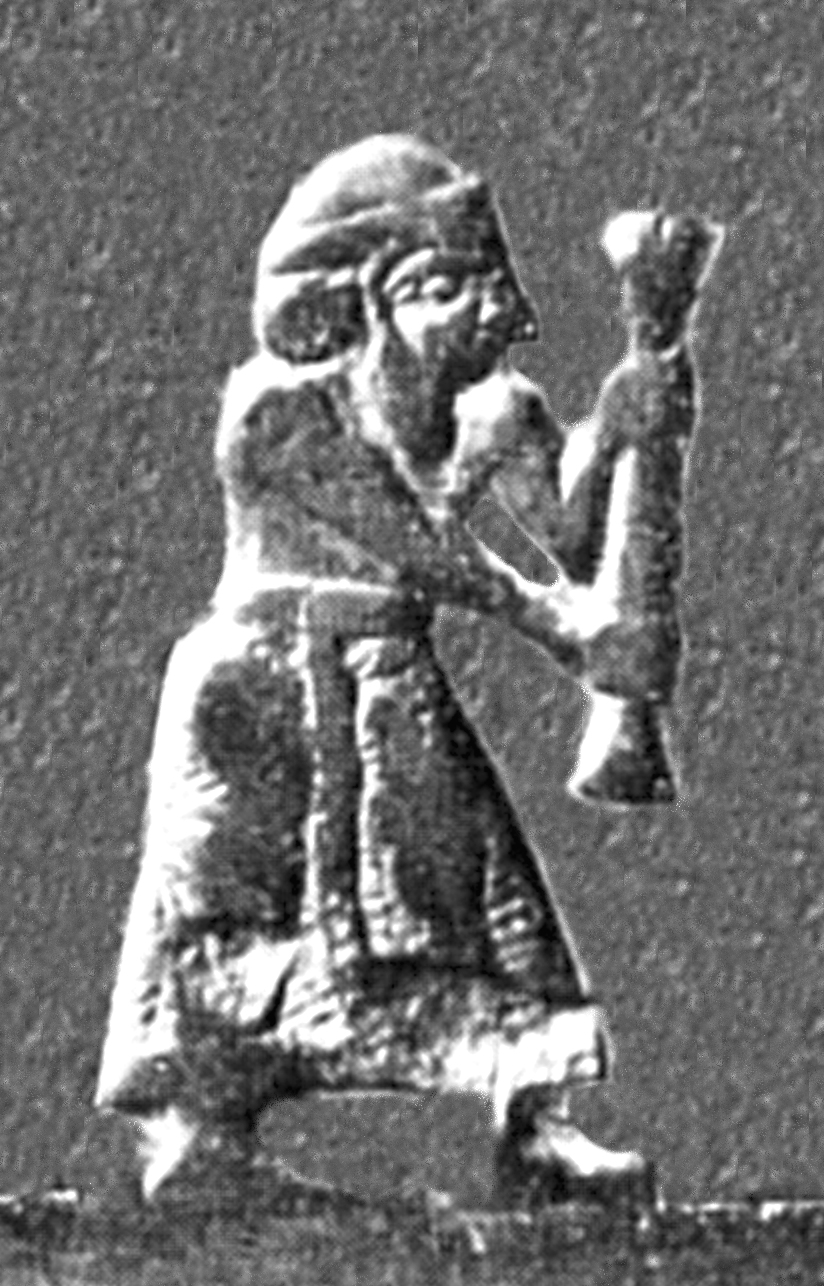
A kilt or "net-dress" on the Blau Monuments (3000-2900 BC)

=== Early Dynastic Period (2700-2350 BC): kaunakes ===
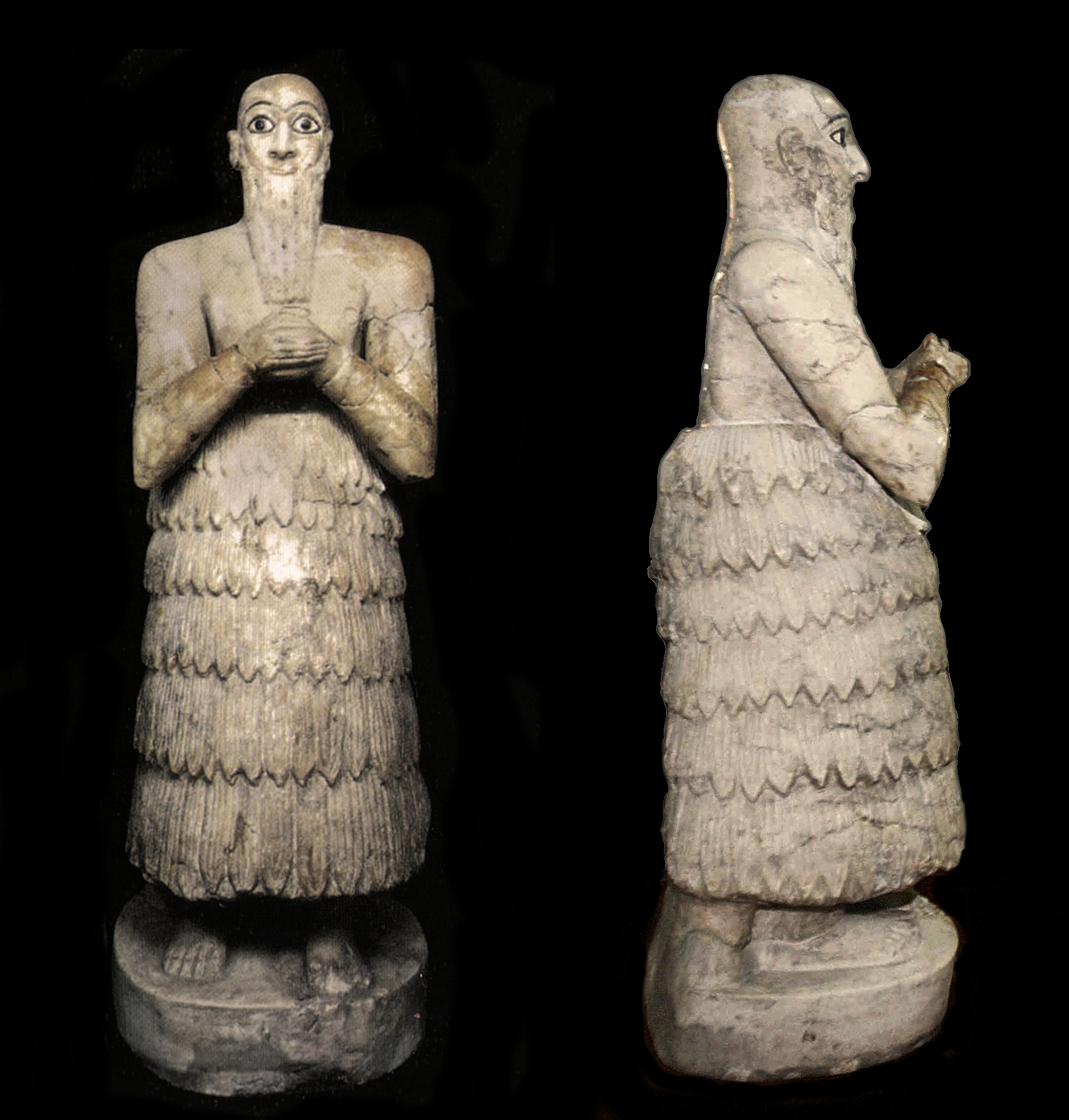
Statue of Iku-Shamagan, King of Mari, wearing the Kaunakes. c. 2500 BCE.

The Early Dynastic Period, between 2,700 and 2,350 BC, was marked by high culture. The dress was a unisex garment which both men and women wore. The skirt was made from sheepskin and was worn with the skin turned inside and with tufts ornamented like a toothed comb over the wool. It was used as a wraparound skirt tied and worn from the waist, extending to the knees. Servants and soldiers wore the shortest garments, while persons of high status wore longer ones with the skirt often extending down to the ankles. The upper part of the body was either covered with another sheepskin cloak spread across the shoulders or left bare. It was only around 2,500 BC that the sheepskin garment was replaced by a textile made of woven wool; however, the tuft part of the dress was continued by "sewing tufts onto the garment or by weaving loops into the fabric". The Greeks called this dress kaunakes. This type of dress is featured in sculptures and mosaics of this period.

== History ==
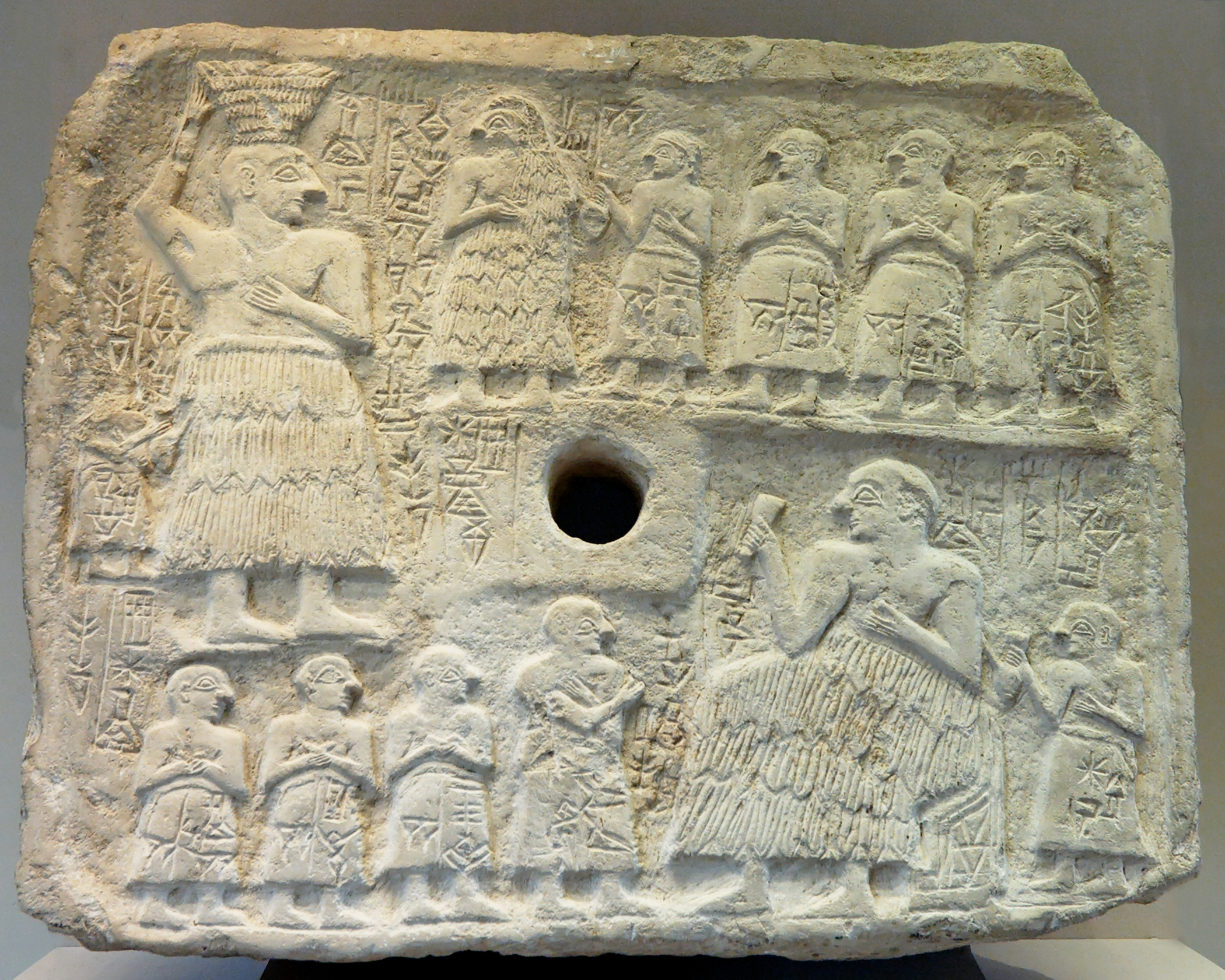
Votive relief of Ur-Nanshe, king of Lagash, Early Dynastic III (2550–2500 BC), with all figures wearing kaunakes

In a Sumerian image dated between 2,900 and 2,600 BC, the dress was worn as a pagne, and a simple fleece pelt was used as a body wrap, but retained the tail part. In some images, the wraparound covered the body and crossed over the left shoulder. Following the discovery of weaving, kaunakes were designed with tufts of wool stitched into the cloth to "simulate the curling fleece fur". It was a rustic fabric made of sheepskin, camel or goat's hide, fashioned as a shawl or skirts called the "thick blanket" that evolved to suit the severe weather conditions of the Sumerian and Akkadian Mesopotamian region.

It is also believed that kaunakes, as a fashioned fleece, while not mentioned before 300 BC, could be traced to the 400–300 BC. During the Greek period of Aristophanes, the garment was made from goat's hair or wool in the style of a weighty mantle or cape. Coptic Egypt, not Mesopotamia, is credited with the original design of woven tapestry that projects long locks or strands of wool. Its manufacture evolved into kaunakes when the woven fringe design began to mirror the original fleece and fur and was shaped as a mantle. These were worn during the winter season as a shawl over the shoulders, and during summer, adapted as a skirt. Over the centuries, many designs evolved with sleeves, and variants were made with cloth instead of fleece, and eventually, it evolved back to a cape sans sleeves.

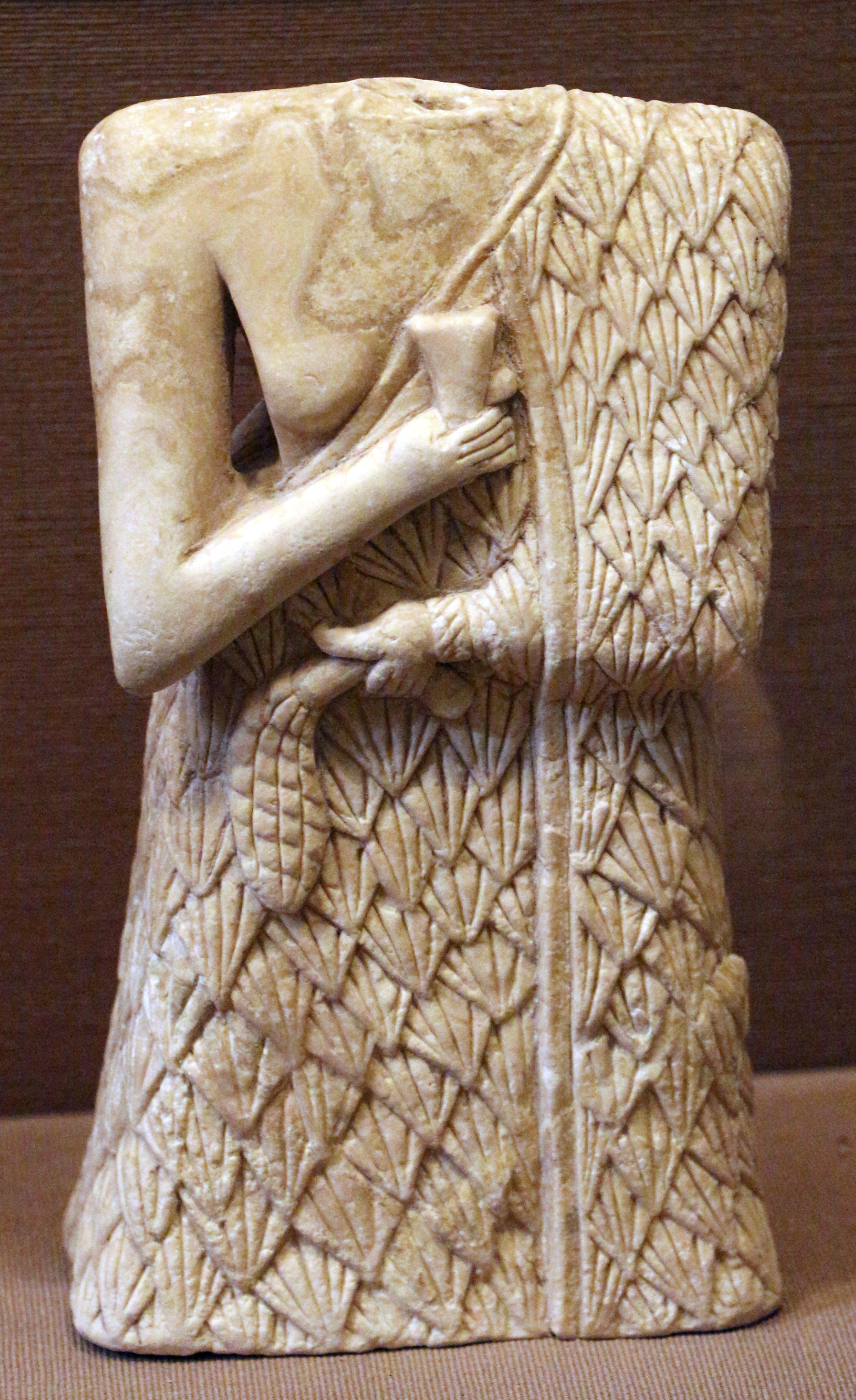
Female statuette, with cup and bracelet, Khafajah, 2650-2550 BCE

In Athens, initially the dress was thought to be of Persian origin, but later it was identified as a Babylonian garment, as it matched the textile practices of the northeast from Mesopotamia. Part of the confusion arose from the naming of the garment, because the root word is linguistically closer to the Iranian language, rather than the Babylonian language. The dress was also used by a stage actor in a drama scene of Aristophanes' Wasps in Athens, as the design of the exotic dress suited the dramatic effect, given that it was "visually distinctive," heavy and with small decorative tufts. The Athenians' believe that the kaunakes was of Persian origin and not from Babylon from an understanding that the dress was an exported item and could have originated from Anatolia (Kilikia or Phrygia), the Levant (Phoenicia or Syria), or Mesopotamia (Babylon), which were all part of the Persian Empire in the fifth century BC.

== Purpose ==
An image dated to about the 3rd millennium BC from the Temple of Ishtar at Mari, Tell Hariri, in Syria shows kaunakes wrapped as a cloak around the shoulders of an alabaster image of a woman in a seated posture; the kaunakes are inferred as made from goat hair or wool. From 2,450 BC, it was a royal dress, as seen from the figures in prayer mode in Mesopotamia. The dress was formed with woolly tufts laid successively in horizontal lines and suspended vertically. It was fashioned generally as a woman's dress, adorning the left arm and shoulder with the right side exposing the skin and the breast.

== Bibliography ==
- Forbes, R. J. (1971). studies in ancient technology. Brill Archive. p. 9. GGKEY:R5RHS1HQD3Z.
- Miller, Margaret C. (2004). Athens and Persia in the Fifth Century BC: A Study in Cultural Receptivity. Cambridge University Press. ISBN 978-0-521-60758-2.
- Tortora, Phyllis G.; Eubank, Keith (2010). Survey of Historic Costume. New York: A&C Black. ISBN 978-1-56367-806-6.
