= The Utilikilts Company =

American kilt company

Utilikilts Company
- Industry: Clothing
- Founded: April 2000
- Founder: Steven Villegas; Megan Haas
- Products: kilt

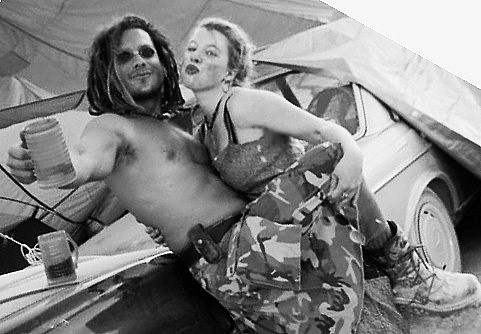
Villegas and Megan Haas at Burning Man. Villegas is wearing a Utilikilt.

The Utilikilts Company is an American contemporary or "utility" kilt company, was founded by Steven Villegas in April 2000. Villegas created his first kilt in the late '90s as an alternative to pants, intended to offer freedom of movement, while working on his motorcycle. Made from an old pair of military pants, Villegas was so fond of his creation he wore it quite often around town. He was approached by his first customer, a local security guard.

That first encounter encouraged him to produce more kilts, and sell them at the Pike Place Market and Fremont Street Market, in Seattle; where he met co-founder, Megan Haas. Villegas and Haas soon formed the Utilikilts Company, establishing both brick-and-mortar and web based storefront for the product.

== Commercial success ==
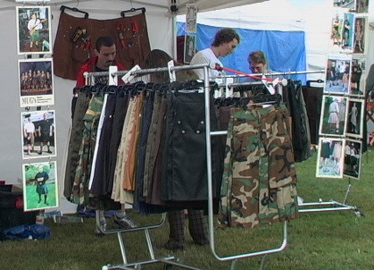
Utilikilt booth at 2004 Skagit Valley Highland Games

Utilikilt's commercial success is primarily from word of mouth, as the company does not pay for product placement or commercial endorsement and eschews professional models in favor of photos of actual customers. Despite this low-key approach, sales grew from 750 kilts the first year to over 11,000 three years later. The company received a big boost in recognition after Richard Hatch donned a Utilikilt on-screen in Survivor: All-Stars. After working together for five years Haas left the company in 2005.

The Utilikilt was also used as part of the costume for the O.Z. rebels in the Sci-Fi Channel miniseries Tin Man (2007)

The character Lafayette wears a Utilikilt in the premiere episode of HBO series True Blood.

A Utilikilt is the featured prop promoting gender equality in Linda Biggs' artwork, "One of the Boys."
