= Sonia Hicks =

Christian minister

The Reverend Sonia Hicks

President of the Methodist Conference
- In office 2021–2022
- Vice President: Barbara Easton
- Preceded by: Richard Teal
- Succeeded by: Graham Thompson

Personal details
- Occupation: Presbyter in the Methodist Church

Sonia Hicks is a British Methodist minister who was elected to serve as President of the Methodist Conference from June 2021 to June 2022.

== Personal life and education ==
She worked as a bank clerk for four years before training at The Queen's College (now the Queen's Foundation), Birmingham. Hicks is married to Conrad Hicks, a Methodist minister. They have three children.

== Ministry ==
After Hicks was ordained (received into full connexion), she and her husband both were in the High Wycombe circuit for two years and then the Watford circuit for the following by four years. In 1998 they both moved to Jamaica where she was superintendent of the Manchioneal circuit for five years. They then moved to the Dublin North circuit in the Republic of Ireland for nine years. In 2012 she returned to Britain and joined the Thames Valley circuit where she is the superintendent minister with pastoral charge of three churches.

Hicks has been a circuit superintendent in the British Methodist Church, the Methodist Church in the Caribbean and the Americas, and the Methodist Church in Ireland. She has been a trustee for charities such as Christian Aid Ireland and also served on committees within the organisation of the church.

In her ministry she celebrates diversity and is opposed to all forms of injustice.

In 2020 she was elected to the annual post as president of the Methodist Conference from June 2021 until June 2022. Hicks became the first black woman to hold the post. In her inaugural address in June 2021, she spoke about how the church should respond to racism and social division, both within the church and in wider society and how these tensions should be acknowledged as well as countered.

During her presidency the Methodist Conference voted to change the definition of marriage to be "a lifelong union in body, mind and spirit of two people who freely enter it". This allowed the church to celebrate and recognise the commitment of unmarried cohabiting couples as well as allow weddings between people of the same sex to be conducted. Ministers are able to opt out of officiating at these weddings through a conscience clause.

Hicks presided over the 2023 Methodist Conference. This responsibility fell upon her as Graham Thompson, the President of the Conference, decided not to attend due to an ongoing investigation related to safeguarding failings.
