= Steward (Methodism) =

Local church leadership role

In Methodism, a steward is a member of a local church who exercises leadership and holds responsibility for the practical life of the church. This role includes specific duties connected with weekly services and offerings. They may be appointed by a pastor/minister or the congregation, depending on the denomination. The position of stewards is a hallmark of classic Methodism.

== General characteristics and duties ==
Stewardship is a voluntary role. Duties include greeting all those who attend church upon their arrival, assisting in the distribution of Holy Communion (in which they are known as communion stewards), counting the tithes and offerings given to the church, and ensuring that the local preacher is cared for when he or she arrives to preach at a church. This may involve the steward providing a travelling local preacher with a meal at the steward's home after the service of worship as historic Methodism teaches Sunday Sabbatarianism, which prohibits dining at restaurants on the Lord's Day (cf. outward holiness).

Subsets of certain Methodist connexions (denominations), such as the Wesleyan Methodist Church, historically included circuit stewards, society stewards, chapel stewards, poor stewards (who counted the offerings), and communion stewards. The 1908 Book of Discipline of the U.S. Methodist Episcopal Church provided the following standard to be used in appointing stewards, which continues to be found in the Book of Disciplines of certain successor connexions today: "Let the Stewards be persons of solid piety who are members of the Church in the Charge, who both know and love Methodist Doctrine and Discipline, and are of good natural and acquired abilities to transact the temporal business of the Church."

== History ==
The first stewards were appointed by John Wesley (later by the superintendents). After Wesley's death, the societies themselves were consulted in making these appointments. Most societies had two stewards, and Wesley required that one be replaced each year.

== Role in examining probationary members ==
In the historic Methodist practice concerning church membership, probationers seeking full membership in their Methodist connexion, after their six-month proving period, sit before the Leaders and Stewards' Meeting of the local congregation, which consists of class leaders and stewards, where they are to provide "satisfactory assurance both of the correctness of his faith and of his willingness to observe and keep the rules of the church." Following this, the Leaders and Stewards' Meeting approves the probationer for full membership in the church. This traditional practice of the Methodist Episcopal Church in admitting full members continues in many Methodist connexions today, such as the Lumber River Conference of the Holiness Methodist Church and the African Methodist Episcopal Zion Church.

== See also ==
- Churchwarden
- Class leader
- Deaconess
- Itinerant preacher
