= Methodist Peace Fellowship =

British organisation

The Methodist Peace Fellowship is a British Methodist Christian pacifist organisation.

The Methodist Peace Fellowship (MPF) was founded by Rev. Henry Carter in 1933 to inform and unite Methodists who covenanted together "to renounce war and all its works and ways."' It is part of the Fellowship of Reconciliation. Members were traditionally expected to accept a fully pacifist position, however MPF also encourages others who are sympathetic to the peace cause to enrol as 'supporters'.

The MPF arranges a public meeting each year in connection with the British Methodist Conference, and in other ways seeks to witness at national level through Methodist channels. The MPF has a national executive that plans activity, while also encouraging members to work through the Fellowship of Reconciliation or local peace organisations.

At one time the Methodist Peace Fellowship claimed a quarter of all Methodist ministers among its members.

In 2021, The Revd Dr Barbara Glasson was appointed the Fellowship's President and The Revd Christopher Collins was elected Chair.

== See also ==
- List of anti-war organizations
