= Christ Church, Nelson =

Christ Church
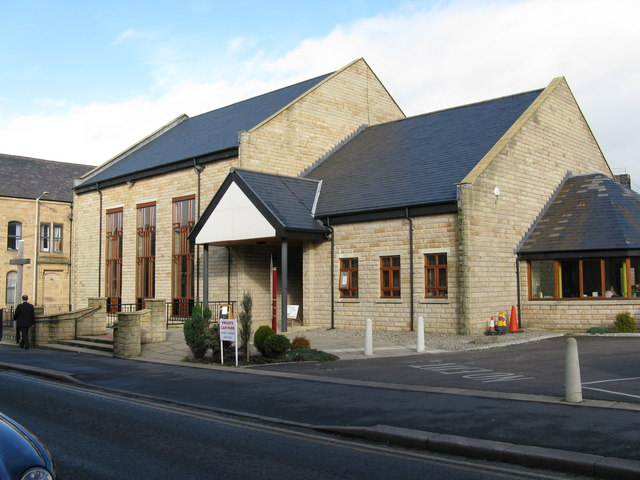
- The church in 2008
- Christ Church
- 53°50′11.8″N 2°12′59.9″W
- OS grid reference: SD 85841 37837
- Location: Carr Rd, Nelson, Lancashire
- Country: England
- Denomination: Methodist Church of Great Britain; Roman Catholic Church
- Website: Catholic Directory

Architecture
- Functional status: Active
- Architect(s): Grimshaw & Townsend
- Completed: 2004 (shared church building)

Administration
- Diocese: Roman Catholic Diocese of Salford

Christ Church is a church and local ecumenical partnership in Nelson, Lancashire, England. It is situated on Carr Road in the town centre. The building has been shared by the Methodist Church of Great Britain and the Roman Catholic Church since 2004 – a rare example of an ecumenical union between Methodists and Roman Catholics.

The Catholic congregation which meets in the church is the successor to the first mission in Nelson, dedicated to Saint Joseph, which used three successive church buildings. The Catholics began sharing a now-demolished building with the Methodists in 2001, construction of the Carr Road premises began in 2002, and it was opened on 6 June 2004 by Bishop Terence Brain. In 2019 a ceremony, attended by leaders from each denomination, was held to renew the "covenant" between the two traditions. The church is active and used for Methodist services and Catholic masses.

The church building is constructed with a steel frame and concrete blocks, faced in local stone and with a slate roof. It has stained glass windows and banners with a bifurcate theme.

== See also ==
- Roman Catholic Diocese of Salford
- United and uniting churches
