= Church membership =

State of being accepted into a local congregation

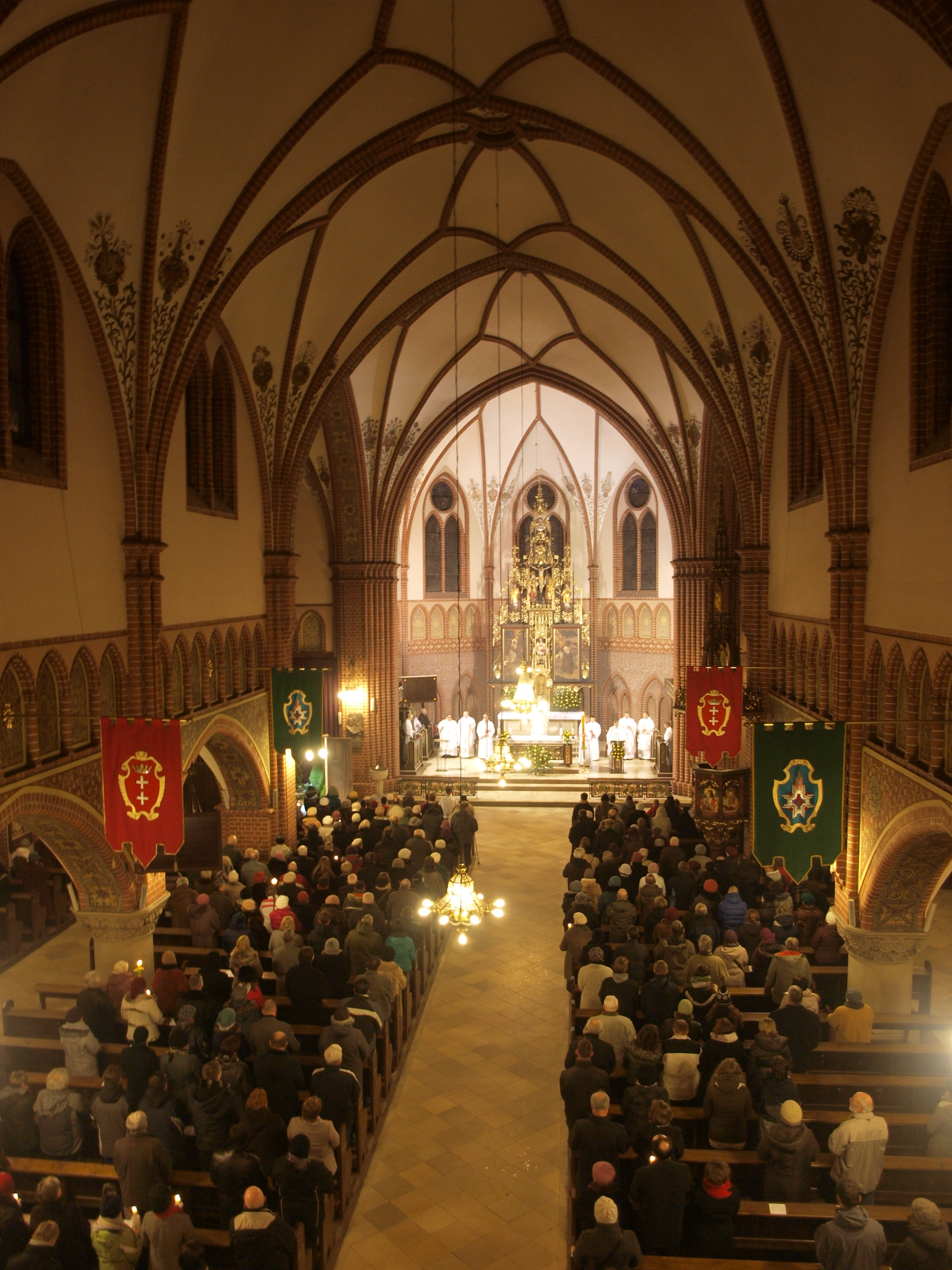
In many liturgical traditions of Christianity (such as Catholicism, Lutheranism and Anglicanism), catechumens are received into church membership during the Easter Vigil.

Church membership, in Christianity, is the state of belonging to a local church congregation, which in most cases, simultaneously makes one a member of a Christian denomination and the universal Christian Church. Christian theologians have taught that church membership is commanded in the Bible. The process of becoming a church member varies based on the Christian denomination. Those preparing to become full members of a church are known variously as catechumens, candidates or probationers depending on the Christian denomination and the sacramental status of the individual.

== Theology of church membership ==
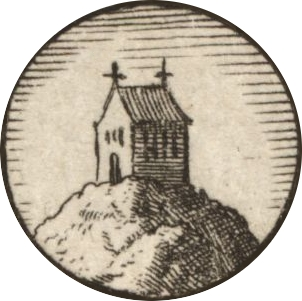
"The Church is the congregation of saints, in which the Gospel is rightly taught and the Sacraments are rightly administered." –Augsburg Confession

Christian theologians such as Bostwick Hawley teach that church membership is commanded in scripture, grounding this in the fact that "apostolic letters are addressed to the Churches", "Apostolic salutations are to Churches", "Jesus Christ is the founder of the Church", "authority and power of discipline are vested in the Church", "Believers on earth are a part of the true spiritual Church", the "general Church is the spiritual kingdom of Christ", "Jesus Christ is Head of the Church, and Christians in an organized capacity are the body", "Ecclesia, meaning assembly...designates a Church, or congregation of Christians, having the ordinances of the Gospel and discipline duly administered", and "To the Church belong the ministry, the Scriptures, and ordinances for the perfecting of the saints". Hawley states that the duty of church membership is taught:

1. From the teaching and practice of the apostles. Acts ii, 41, 47; xiv, 23, 27; Rom. i, 7; 1 Cor. i, 2; Eph. iii, 5.

2. From the authority of our Lord. Matt. xxviii, 19; xviii, 18; iv, 19.

3. The Church is the temple of the Holy Spirit, and Christians share his influences somewhat because of a union with the Church. Eph. ii, 20–22; 1 Pet. ii, 5; Heb. iii, 6; 1 Cor. iii, 16; 2 Cor. vi, 16.

4. Christians derive spiritual life and health from the Head of the Church, because of a union with him in the Church. John v, 24; xx, 31; 1 John v, 11, 12.

5. Religious prosperity is promoted in the Church. Matt. xviii, 20; John. xiv, 23; xv, 4; Eph. v, 23, 26, 27.

6. The perpetuity of the Church depends on the union of Christians with it. Isa. ix, 7; Dan. ii, 44; Matt. xxviii, 20; I Cor. xi, 26; xv, 25.

Reformed theologian Kevin DeYoung argues that church membership keeps Christians accountable to God. Missiologist Ed Stetzer states that membership in the church exemplifies covenant theology.

== Church membership by Christian denomination ==
=== Anabaptist ===
Those who are interested in becoming an Anabaptist Christian are known as Seekers. After a person has attended an Anabaptist church and wishes to pursue membership, they enter a six-month proving period. During this time, the individual "is instructed in the church beliefs and practices, which may include review of the church guidance and statements of faith, such as Dordrecht Confession of Faith (1633)". After the proving period, the probationer is baptized and is accepted as a member of the congregation.

=== Baptist ===
In the Baptist tradition, individuals join the visible church through Baptism as repentant believers by confessing faith in Christ (credobaptism), believing the promises of God made to them in the sacrament. Baptist converts who have been baptized in another Christian congregation can simply transfer their membership to a Baptist church, as showing their baptismal certificate or using a letter of transfer.

=== Catholicism ===
In the Catholic Church, church membership includes those who have received the sacrament of baptism. Individuals who have been baptized in another mainstream Christian denomination who wish to be received as a member of the Catholic Church are known as candidates and their reception into the Catholic Church is done through a profession of faith, followed by the reception of Holy Communion and Confirmation. Those persons who have never received the sacrament of baptism are canonically considered non-Christians and if they are preparing to become a member of the Catholic Church, they are known as catechumens. Such persons join the Catholic Church through a process called the Rite of Christian Initiation of Adults. This period typically lasts for one year. Subsequent to joining the Catholic Church is a period of mystagogy, defined as the "journey of growing closer to God and deepening understanding and practice of the faith."

The Catechism of the Catholic Church notes that a distinction can be made between those people who are members "in a bodily manner" and those "in the heart" of the church, warning that members of the body of the Church who "[do] not persevere in charity" cannot be assured of salvation.

The Instrumentum laboris of the XIII Ordinary General Assembly of the Synod of Bishops acknowledged that in some parts of the world, the Catholic Church is "witnessing a decline in sacramental and Christian practice among the faithful to the point that some members can even be called 'non-believers' (Greek: άπιστοι, apistoi).

=== Lutheranism ===
In the Lutheran Churches, those raised in the tradition normatively become church members through receiving baptism, confirmation, and first communion. Individuals who are not raised as Lutheran Christians who seek to join church membership undergo a period of instruction in which they attend a class that teaches Luther's Small Catechism. Upon completion, they are received into church membership.

=== Methodism ===
Traditionally, Methodist connexions descending from the tradition of the Methodist Episcopal Church have a probationary period of six months before an individual is admitted as a full member of a congregation. Given the wide attendance at Methodist revival meetings, many people started to attend Methodist services of worship regularly, though they had not yet committed to membership. When they made that commitment, becoming a probationer was the first step and during this period, probationers "receive additional instruction and provide evidence of the seriousness of their faith and willingness to abide by church discipline before being accepted into full membership." In addition to this, to be a probationary member of a Methodist congregation, a person traditionally requires an "earnest desire to be saved from [one's] sins". In the historic Methodist system, probationers were eligible to become members of class meetings, where they could be further discipled in their faith. Catechisms such as The Probationer's Handbook, authored by S. Olin Garrison, have been used by probationers to learn the Methodist faith. After six months, probationers were examined before the Leaders and Stewards' Meeting (which consisted of Class Leaders and Stewards) where they were to provide "satisfactory assurance both of the correctness of his faith and of his willingness to observe and keep the rules of the church." If probationers were able to do this, they were admitted as full members of the congregation by the pastor. Full members of a Methodist congregation "were obligated to attend worship services on a regular basis" and "were to abide by certain moral precepts, especially as they related to substance use, gambling, divorce, and immoral pastimes." This practice continues in certain Methodist connexions, such as the Lumber River Conference of the Holiness Methodist Church, in which probationers must be examined by the pastor, class leader, and board for full membership, in addition to being baptized. The same structure is found in the African Methodist Episcopal Zion Church, which teaches:

In order that we may not admit improper persons into our church, great care be taken in receiving persons on probation, and let not one be so received or enrolled who does not give satisfactory evidence of his/her desire to flee the wrath to come and to be saved from his/her sins. Such a person satisfying us in these particulars may be received into our church on six months probation; but shall not be admitted to full membership until he/she shall have given satisfactory evidence of saving faith in the Lord Jesus Christ. —¶89, The Doctrine and Discipline of the African Methodist Episcopal Zion Church

The pastor and class leader are to ensure that "that all persons on probation be instructed in the Rules and Doctrines of The African Methodist Episcopal Zion Church before they are admitted to Full Membership" and that "probationers are expected to conform to the rules and usages of the Church, and to show evidence of their desire for fellowship in the Church". After the six-month probation period, "A probationer may be admitted to full membership, provided he/she has served out his/her probation, has been baptized, recommended at the Leaders' Meeting, and, if none has been held according to law, recommended by the Leader, and, on examination by the Pastor before the Church as required in ¶600 has given satisfactory assurance both of the correctness of his/her faith, and of his/her wilingess to observe and keep the rules of our Church." The Allegheny Wesleyan Methodist Connection admits to associate membership, by vote of the congregation, those who give affirmation to two questions: "1) Does the Lord now forgive your sins? 2) Will you acquaint yourself with the discipline of our connection and earnestly endeavor to govern your life by its rules as God shall give you understanding?" Probationers who wish to become full members are examined by the Advisory Board before being received as such through four vows (on the New Birth, Entire Sanctification, Outward Holiness, and assent to the Articles of Religion) and a covenant. In the United Methodist Church, the process of becoming a professing member of a congregation is done through the taking membership vows (normatively in the rite of confirmation) after a period of instruction and receiving the sacrament of baptism. It is the practice of certain Methodist connexions that when people become members of a congregation, they are offered the Right Hand of Fellowship. Methodists traditionally celebrate the Covenant Renewal Service as the watchnight service annually on New Year's Eve, in which members renew their covenant with God and the Church.

=== Moravian and Hussite ===
In the Moravian Church, those seeking to become church members normatively do so through confirmation (as is the case of those raised in the Church). Those transferring from other mainstream Christian denominations receive the Right Hand of Fellowship, while non-Christians receive the sacrament of baptism as they enter the Church.

=== Pentecostalism ===
==== Holiness Pentecostalism ====
The process of becoming a member in churches of the Holiness Pentecostal tradition is similar to that of the Methodist tradition. In the Fire Baptized Holiness Church of God of the Americas, those persons who have experienced the New Birth are eligible for membership. Members are required to assent to and adhere to the Fire Baptized Holiness Church's general standards.

==== Finished Work Pentecostalism ====
In the Assemblies of God, a Finished Work Pentecostal denomination, church membership is taught as being "in harmony with the whole of New Testament teaching."

=== Reformed ===
==== Continental Reformed ====
In the Reformed Church of America, two tiers of membership include Baptized Members and Confessing Members. Confessing Members are those who "have been baptized and have professed or reaffirmed their faith before a board of elders."

==== Presbyterian ====
Individuals who wish to join the membership of the Presbyterian Church do so through a profession of faith and baptism (if they have not received the sacrament).

==== Congregationalist ====
Those who wish to join Congregationalist church membership indicate their interest to the minister who enrolls them in a membership class. Upon completing the membership class, a board of deacons approves the names after which they are "received into membership as part of a regular worship service".

== See also ==
- Church attendance
- Church visible
- Covenant theology
- Conversion to Christianity
