= Independent Methodist Connexion =

The Independent Methodist Connexion is a British group of Nonconformist congregations that have their roots in the 18th-century Evangelical Revival. It emphasises the equality of all members and independence of the local church.

The connexion is independent from the dominant Methodist denomination in Britain, and is not to be confused with the Fellowship of Independent Methodist Churches, which is based in the same region.

== Origins ==
Their first chapels came into being in the north-west of England and met together for the first time in 1806 at Manchester. Annual Meetings and exchange of preachers constituted the only tangible link between the churches for many years. Of the early leading figures, the most prominent was Peter Phillips of Warrington; he is generally regarded as the denomination's founding father. By trade he was a chairmaker, but as an unpaid minister and preacher he travelled a wide area of the country and was instrumental in the affiliation of many churches to the Connexion during a period of over 50 years.

Though some of the early congregations used the title Independent Methodists, there were many other names: for example, Free Gospel Church, Christian Lay Church, Christian Brethren, Gospel Pilgrims and Quaker Methodists. It was not until 1898 that the Annual Meeting finally chose the name Independent Methodist.

== Denominational distinctiveness ==
In addition to their Wesleyan heritage, Quaker influence was prevalent among some early Independent Methodists, many of whom adopted the Quaker plainness of speech and dress. The absence of any distinction between clergy and laity in the denomination owes much to the Quaker view of church and ministry.

The ‘independent’ or ‘congregational’ concept of government, whereby the local church is autonomous of a central body and responsible for its own affairs, also played a part in the formation of the denomination. During the 19th century, the denomination expanded, though mainly remaining in the North of England. Its churches were often located in industrial areas amongst the poorest of the population. They became very active in education, temperance work and the relief of poverty.

Today, though the denomination is smaller than it once was, many churches continue to have a vigorous witness in the communities where they are found. Often they are involved with other churches in local evangelistic work and some have sent out missionaries to serve overseas.

At the beginning of 2005 the Independent Methodist Connexion and the Baptist Union of Great Britain entered into a partnership.

== See also ==
- Fellowship of Independent Methodist Churches
