= All We Can =

UK-based charity

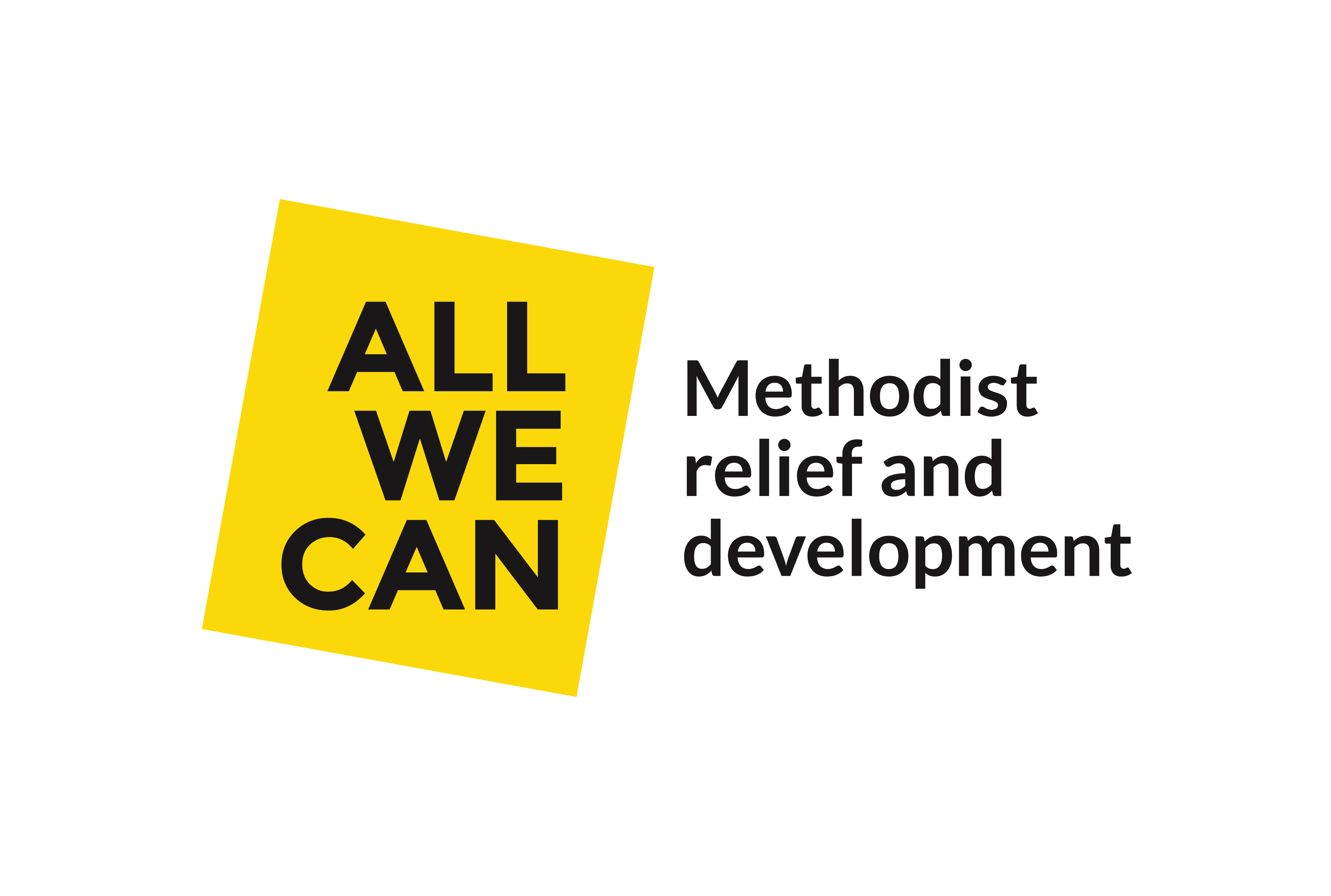
The All We Can 'lively square' logo

All We Can is the operating name for the Methodist Relief and Development Fund.

All We Can is an international relief and development charity, rooted in the Methodist faith. All We Can has a tradition of challenging injustice, and striving for a world where every community has the power, dignity, and resources to lead their own futures.

Working across six priority countries, All We Can has twenty-four long-term development partners. All We Can's partners are addressing the root causes of injustice in myriad ways, including improving access to education, advocating for children's rights, and future-proofing agricultural livelihoods at risk from climate change.

All We Can also works with four ChurchCAN partners. ChurchCAN is an All We Can and Methodist Church in Britain joint programme designed to help Methodist partner churches around the world become stronger, more self‑sufficient, and better equipped to lead community‑driven transformation.

Through their Emergency Appeals, All We Can has various humanitarian partners.

== Name ==
The charity's name derives from an apocryphal quote attributed to John Wesley, the founder of Methodism:

Do all the good you can. By all the means you can. In all the ways you can. In all the places you can. At all the times you can. To all the people you can. As long as ever you can.

== History ==
In the 1930s, All We Can was founded by the Methodist Church. Methodist Minister Henry Carter pioneered the Methodist Refugee Fund to improve conditions for refugees, particularly in Austria and Germany.

In the 1940s, the Methodist Refugee Fund became the Methodist Relief Fund (MRF).

In the 1950s, MRF supported the building of Wesley Village in Hong Kong following civil war in China.

In the 1960s, MRF supported Methodist agricultural colleges in Tonga and Haiti.

In the 1980s, the World Development Fund and MRF merged to form Methodist Relief and Development Fund (MRDF).

In the 1990s, MRDF's income reaches £1m for first time and was supporting work in over 50 countries.

In the 2000s, The Boxing Day tsunami in 2004 resulted in the biggest emergency appeal response to date, raising £1.5m.

In the 2010s, MRDF becomes known as All We Can on 8th April 2014.

== Recognition ==
It is recognised as one of the UK's best charities to work for, having been named in the top five "Best Charities to Work For" by Third Sector 2020, where its child-friendly practices were especially recognised, and is known as one of the sector's most pioneering NGOs in development work and humanitarian aid, shortlisted for the Civil Society Awards 2019.
