= Pastoral charge =

Methodist congregations led by a minister

A pastoral charge (from the word pastor), in churches, consists of one or more congregations under the spiritual leadership of a minister or ministry team. The minister is responsible for providing pastoral care to every congregation they are in charge of.

In the United Methodist Church a charge is organized under and subject to the Book of Discipline, with a single governing body called a charge conference, to which a minister is appointed as pastor in charge. Charges are different from churches or congregations as they may encompass more than one church or congregation. This stems from the early days of Methodism in the United States and Canada, when multiple congregations were served by single ministers acting as circuit riders, riding on horseback between the sometimes far-flung congregations in their charge.

In the Presbyterian Church of Australia, a pastoral charge consists of one or more congregations which share a minister or group of ministers.

== See also ==
- Governance of the British Methodist Church
