= Organisation of the Methodist Church of Great Britain =

Organisational basis of British Methodism

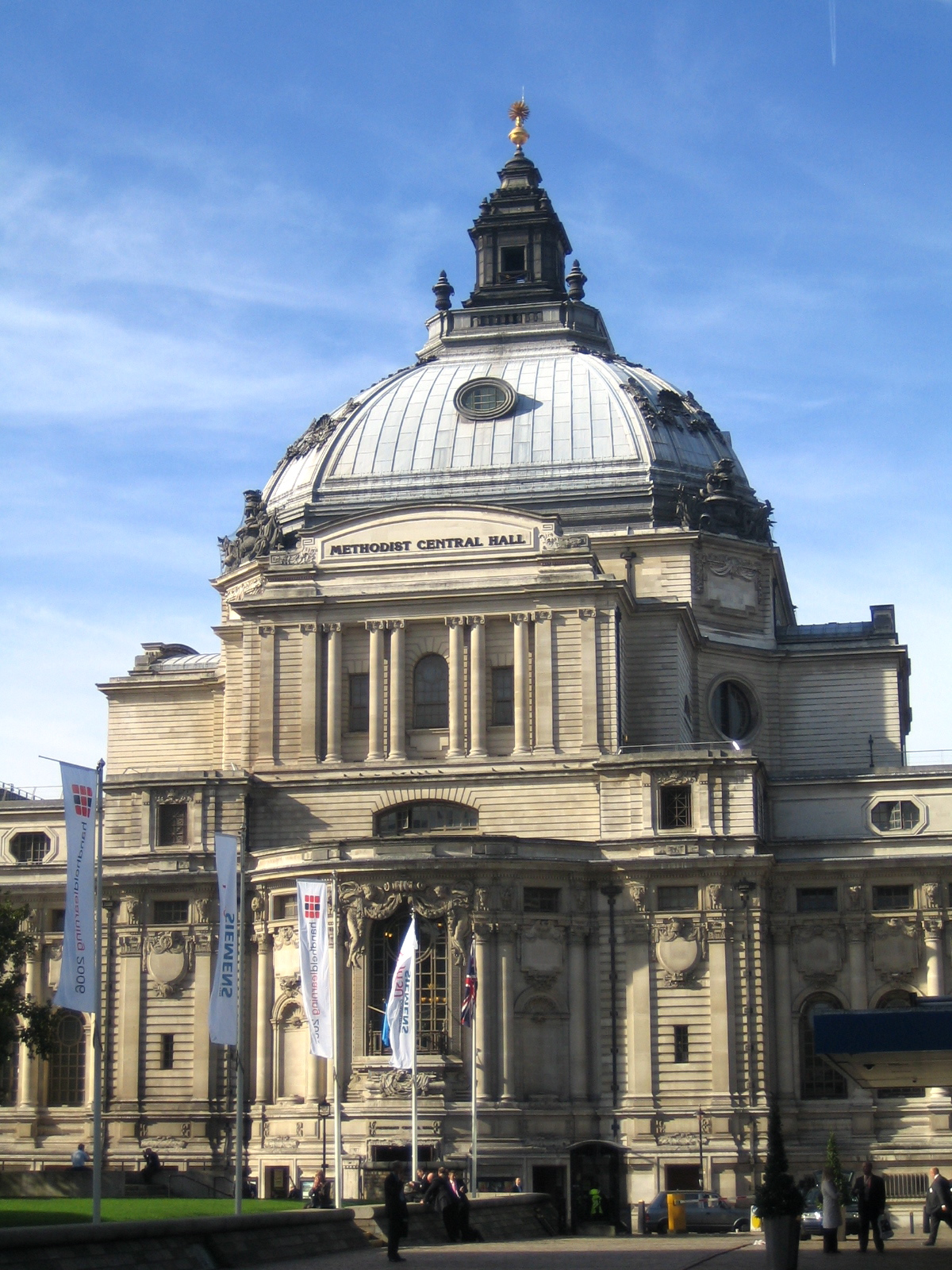
Some large churches, such as Methodist Central Hall (pictured), are standalone Circuits.

The organisation of the Methodist Church of Great Britain is based on the principle of connexionalism. This means that British Methodism, from its inception under John Wesley (1703–1791), has always laid strong emphasis on mutual support, in terms of ministry, mission and finance, of one local congregation for another. No singular church community has ever been seen in isolation either from its immediately neighbouring church communities or from the centralised national organisation. Wesley himself journeyed around the country, preaching and establishing local worshipping communities, called "societies", often under lay leadership. Soon these local communities of worshipping Christians formalised their relationships with neighbouring Methodist communities to create "circuits", and the circuits and societies contained within them, were from the very beginning 'connected' (hence the distinctive Methodist concept of the "Connexion") to the centre and Methodism's governing body, the annual Conference. Today, societies are better known as local churches, although the concept of a community of worshipping Christians tied to a particular location, and subdivided into smaller cell groups called "classes", remains essentially based on Wesley's societies.

Other Methodist connexions which were established by British missionaries are also modelled on the structure of the British Methodist Church.

== Historical origins ==
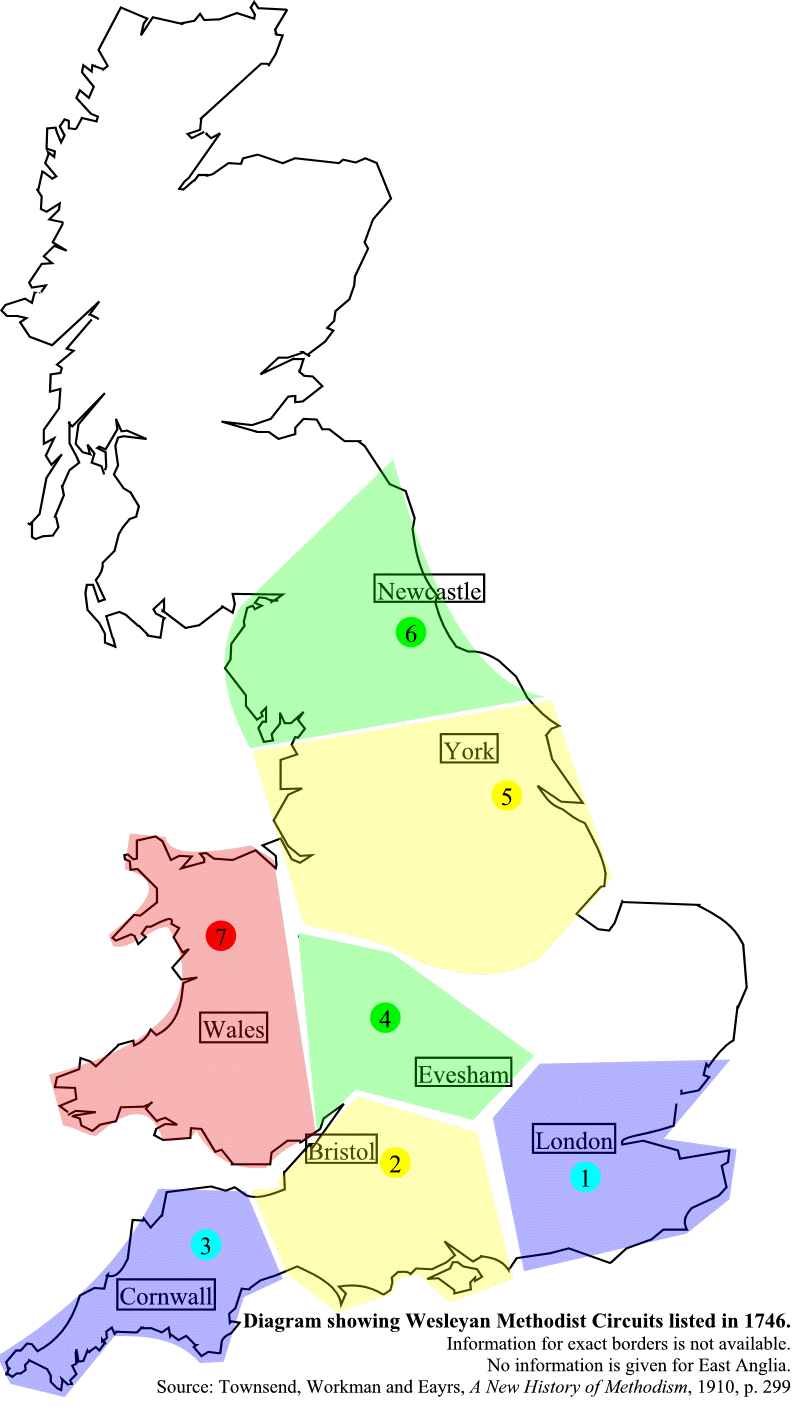
Diagram illustrating the area covered by early Methodist Circuits in 1746. Information is not available for East Anglia, nor for the exact boundaries.

=== The first circuits, 1746 ===
The earliest preachers under John Wesley were itinerant, and preached around an area from a home base. The "circuit", or "round" as they were first named, was therefore the natural name for the area they covered. At first they were named after their founder of main itinerant preacher. For example, 'John Bennet's Round', or the 'Circuit of William Darney's Societies'. The first official list dates from 1746.

1. London (including Surrey, Kent, Essex, Brentford, Egham, Windsor, Wycombe);
2. Bristol (including Somerset, Portland, Wiltshire, Oxfordshire, Gloucester);
3. Cornwall
4. Evesham (including Shrewsbury, Leominster, Hereford, and from Stroud to Wednesbury);
5. Yorkshire (including Cheshire, Lancashire, Derbyshire, Nottinghamshire, Rutland, Lincolnshire);
6. Newcastle
7. Wales

Within that area a number of "societies" would be formed. During the 18th century, John Wesley did not intend establishing churches in a new denomination. His vision was for a revival movement within the Church of England. The societies would be a gathering of people who met for Bible study, prayer, mutual encouragement, and preaching. Usually, this was during the week so that they could attend services in the parish church. The earliest circuits covered a very large area, but gradually shrank as the number of societies increased.

=== Milestones in Wesley's early Methodism ===
The first Wesleyan Methodist society was formed in 1738, the first Methodist building was The Foundery acquired in 1739, and the first class meetings were in 1742.

The first (Wesleyan) Methodist Conference took place at the Foundery in June 1744. The known first plan (of preaching appointments) was made by Wesley in London in 1754. The first recorded quarterly meeting (the usual business meeting of the circuit) was at Todmorden Edge Farm, Todmorden, on 18 October 1748.

John Wesley drew on existing structures, especially those used by the Moravians, who had been so instrumental in his own spiritual development. At their Herrnhut colony he witnessed gatherings for testimony and mutual edification, select bands, classes, conferences on doctrine, open air preaching, preaching by laymen, itinerant preachers, and orphan homes. Most of these features had, indeed, been anticipated by the Waldenses in the 16th century, between whose organisation and that of the Moravians and Methodists there are striking, though probably accidental, resemblances.

=== The beginnings of class meetings ===
The Wesleyan societies were composed of "bands", which were meetings of 5 to 10 like-minded people seeking Christian perfection, and considered the inner core of the societies. John Wesley drew up rules for these in December 1738. Some of the early societies were known by the name of the person in whose home they met, such as 'Mr. Fox's Society', and 'Mr. Ingham's Society'. The origin of the "class" was partly accidental. By 1742, John and Charles Wesley had about 1100 Methodists in London for whom they felt a pastoral responsibility, but could not keep in touch with them and continue their other work. While in Bristol, John Wesley met some members of the society there. One, Captain Foy, suggested that every member give a penny a week until a debt there be paid. When someone objected due to the poverty of many, he offered that 11 of the poorest be grouped with him, he would collect the subscription, and make up any shortfall if any could not pay. Soon afterwards, on hearing that someone was not living as he should, Wesley realised that the group of 12 for collection of money was the basis of a group for weekly meeting for prayer, Bible study, and mutual encouragement.

A class book was kept recording their attendance and their contribution to the funds. When membership rolls started being used to record names of those attending, the very early ones begin with a list of class members. Members were defined as those who had been baptised, received instruction in Methodist governance, and at a special service, were received into "full membership". Others in the congregation were called simply "adherents", and although they supported the activities of the Church as fully as members, they did not enjoy voting rights. Each class was headed by a class leader.

One function of the class leader is that the "class ticket", a quarterly membership ticket for Methodists, be given to his class members, and withheld from those whom they judged unworthy of being called Methodists. The ticket is the membership card for Methodists.

Wesley did not claim the class as essential or of "divine institution", but as wise for practical regulation of Methodists.

== Methodist structures ==
The following is a summary of the main units.

=== Connexion ===
Do not allow yourself one thought of separating from your brothers and sisters, whether their opinions agree with yours or not.

— The Revd John Wesley, articulating the principle of Connexionalism

The old-fashioned spelling of connexion reflects Methodism's origins in the 18th century, when the term was used generally, in e.g. political, commercial and religious contexts, to refer to the circle of those connected to some person or group, and to the relationship thus created. But it was the particular character of the connexion John Wesley maintained with his members, his societies and his itinerant preachers that gave the term its technical significance in Methodism. All were in connexion primarily with him and thence with each other. The term came to be in some senses equivalent to 'denomination' and, later, to 'Church', and connexionalism was descriptive of a particular principle and pattern of church life which emphasized the interdependence of the constituent parts (over against independency). All circuits and districts are ultimately subject to the annual Conference.

After Wesley's death, schisms and resultant branches of Methodism in Britain meant that there were multiple connexions, each with its own conference, before the connexions were united in 1932. Whilst the various branches differed in the balance of authority accorded to the various levels of church government, all accepted some form of connexionalism. This was manifested in "a common bond of discipline and usage for the societies with transferable membership, and the itinerant ministry of those 'in full connexion' with the Conference and stationed by the Conference". Methodist ministers are still "received into full connexion" prior to being ordained.

Supporting the annual conference, the Methodist Council meets three times each year. The 2022 Conference agreed to establish a new body, the Connexional Council, which will replace the Methodist Council and the former Strategy and Resources Committee.

=== District ===
Districts are geographical units, typically one to three counties in extent. There are thirty districts across Great Britain—including two overlapping districts in Wales, one English-speaking and one Welsh. The governing body is called a synod. The Methodist Church formally defines the nature and purpose of the district as being:

to advance the mission of the Church in a region, by providing opportunities for Circuits to work together and support each other, by offering them resources of finance, personnel and expertise, which may not be available locally and by enabling them to engage with the wider society of the region as a whole and address its concerns. (...) It has responsibility for the evaluation of applications by Local Churches and Circuits for approval of or consent to their proposals, when required, or for assistance from district or connexional bodies or funds. Wherever possible the work of the District is carried out ecumenically. The District is thus an expression, over a wider geographical area than the Circuit, of the connexional character of the Church.

=== Circuit ===
A circuit is a grouping of local churches under the care of one or more ministers. They number about 360 (as counted in 2019), and this figure is declining as more circuits amalgamate. The circuit is the main functional unit of Methodism, in that a large number of activities are organised at this level. Ministers are appointed firstly to the circuit and then secondly to the pastoral care of local churches. This means ministers will ordinarily preach and lead worship each Sunday in any church on the circuit but during the rest of the week they exercise pastoral charge over a subset of churches in that circuit. Preaching appointments for both ministers and (lay) local preachers are organised by the circuit and advertised on a preaching plan issued every three months by the leader of the circuit, the superintendent minister.

=== Local church ===
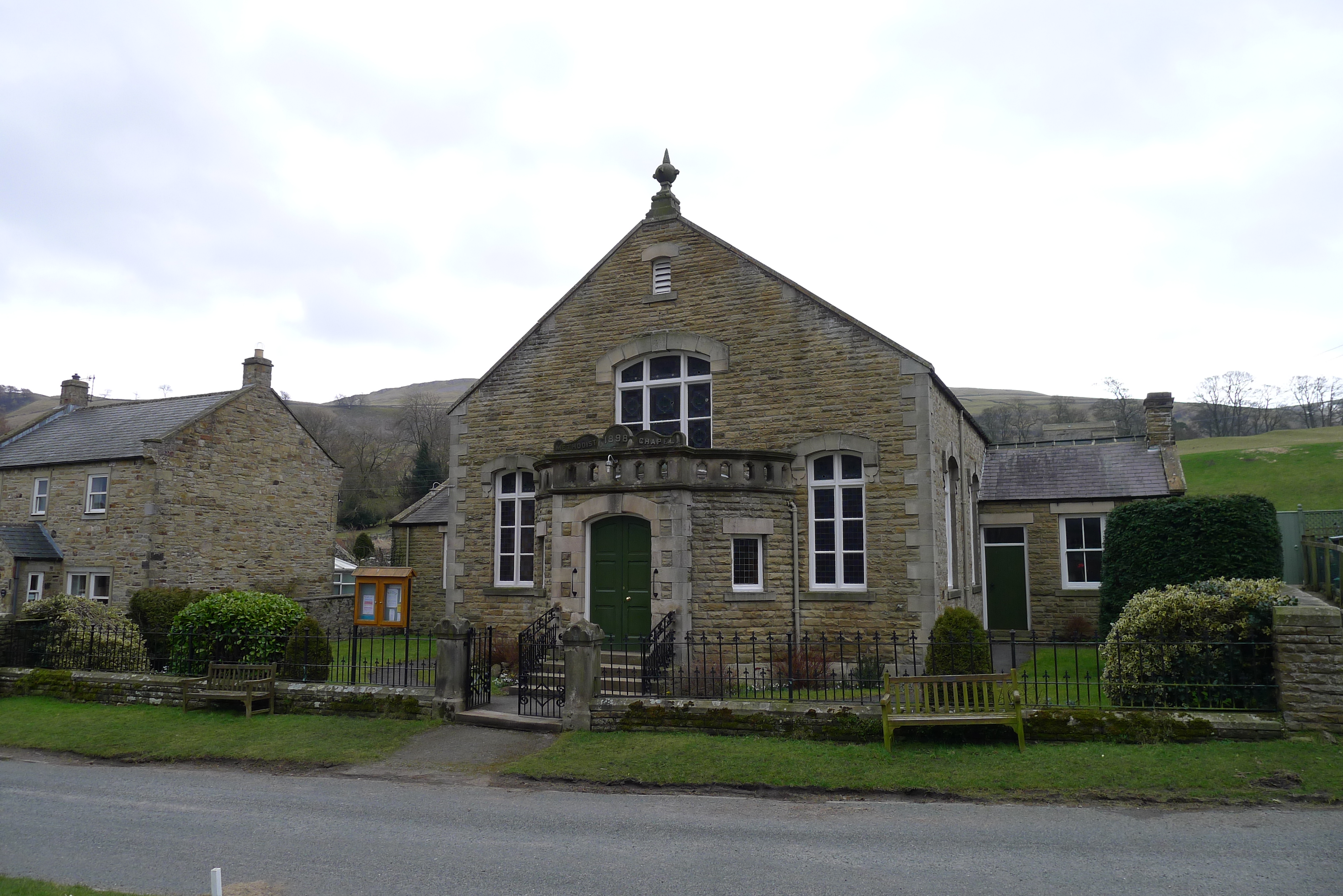
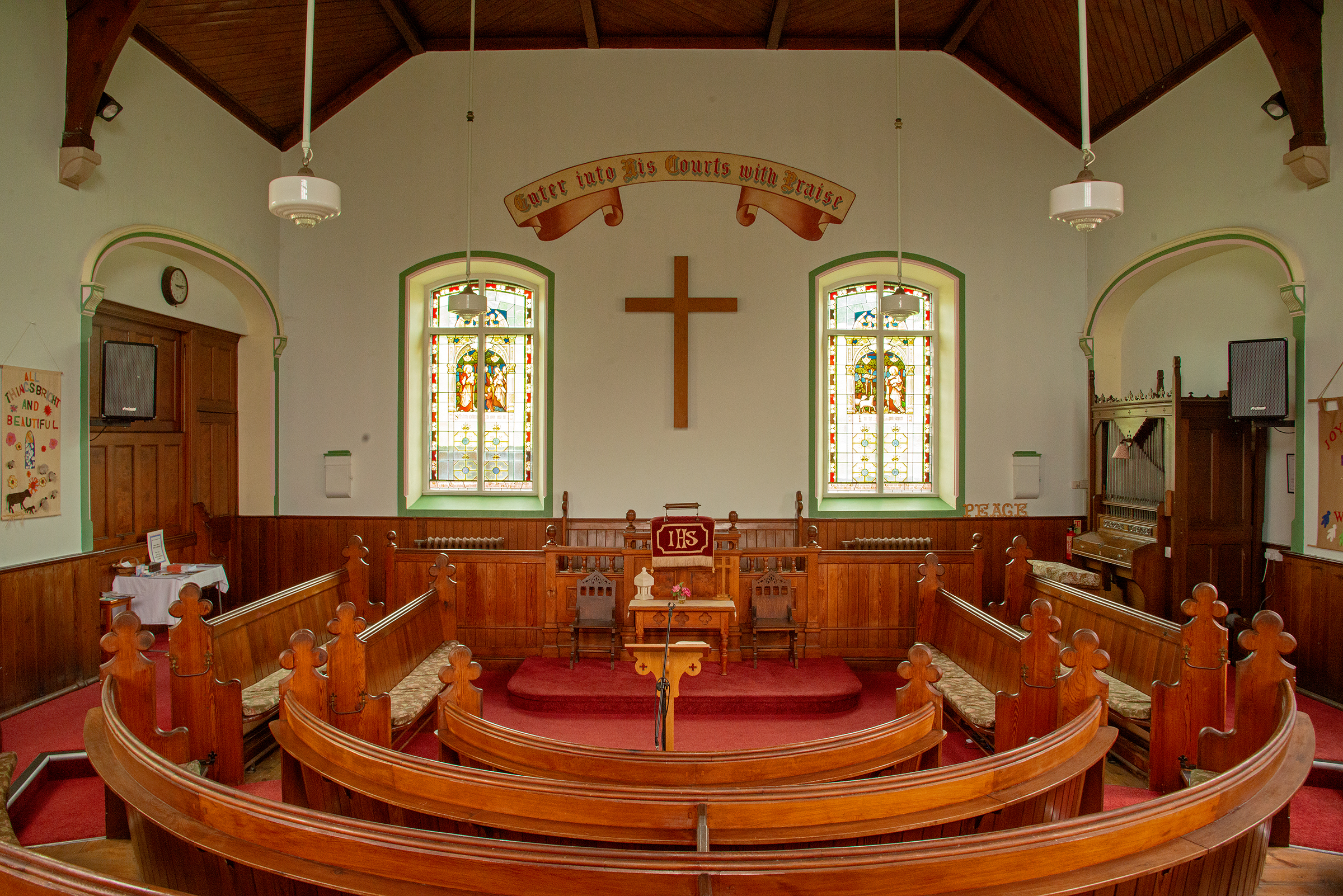
Exterior and interior of a Methodist local church building in West Burton, North Yorkshire

Also called "societies" in certain formal contexts (although an increasingly antiquated name), the term "local church" can refer to both the congregation as well as the particular building it meets in. Membership is always tied to the local church, where members meet together for worship and fellowship. Each congregation is led by a presbyter in charge—also referred to as "the minister". As of 2019 there were almost 170,000 members of 4,110 churches.

=== Class ===
A class is a group of Methodists, normally about twelve, under the guidance of a class leader. In the 20th century it became less common for classes to actually meet together, but many local churches have home fellowships, Bible studies groups, and cell groups by other names. Under the church's Constitutional Practice and Discipline (CPD), where the number of registered local church members falls below six over four successive quarters, the formal "local church" ceases to be recognised as such and is often treated as a "class" subject to the oversight of another Methodist Church or leader.

== List of districts and circuits ==
Superscriptions indicate a local ecumenical partnership (LEP) with one or more other denominations: (B) Baptist; (C) Church of England; (Co) Congregational; (E) Scottish Episcopal Church; (I) Welsh Independents; (M) Moravian; (P) Presbyterian Church of Wales; (S) Church of Scotland; (U) United Reformed Church; (W) Church in Wales

District	Web	Circuit	Web	No. of churches	Churches
Bedfordshire, Essex and Hertfordshire		Bishop's Stortford		3	Bishop's Stortford, Clavering^{CU}, Stansted Free^{U}
Bedfordshire, Essex and Hertfordshire		Chelmsford		12	Braintree (Christ Church)^{U}, Broomsfield, Coggeshall (Christ Church)^{BU}, Great Notley^{BCU}, Chelmsford (Hall Street) (closed 2023), Halstead, Hatfield Peverel, Maldon, Moulsham Lodge, South Woodham Ferrers, Springfield (St Augustine's)^{CU}, Chelmsford (Trinity), Witham
Bedfordshire, Essex and Hertfordshire		Colchester		8	The Ark Colchester, Castle Colchester, Lexden, Mersea, The Well Colchester, Tollgate, Wimpole Road Colchester, Wivenhoe
Bedfordshire, Essex and Hertfordshire		Herts & Essex Border Ecu Area		9	Christ Church Waltham Cross^{C}, Church Langley^{BCU}, Epping, Hertford, Hoddesdon, Leaside Ware^{U}, North Weald, St Andrew's Harlow, Watton at Stone
Bedfordshire, Essex and Hertfordshire		North Bedfordshire		27	Ampthill, Beeston, Trinity Biggleswade, Howard Memorial Cardington, Clapham, Clophill, Cranfield, Flitwick, Haynes, Henlow, Kempston East, Kempston West, Langford, Lidlington, London Road Bedford, Oakley, Park Road Bedford, Priory Bedford, Putnoe Heights Bedford, Sandy, Sharnbrook, Shefford, Stewartby United^{BCU}, Upper Caldecote, Willington, Wilstead, New Life Wootton
Bedfordshire, Essex and Hertfordshire		North Hertfordshire		14	All Saints Stevenage^{C}, Arlesey, Baldock, Benington, Central Letchworth, Christchurch Hitchin^{U}, High Street Stevenage, Norton Letchworth, Pirton, St Faith's Hitchin^{C}, St Hugh & St John Stevenage^{C}, St Paul's Broadwater, Stotfold, Trinity Knebworth^{U}
Bedfordshire, Essex and Hertfordshire		St Albans & Welwyn		10	Birchwood Hatfield, Digswell Village^{C}, Hatfield Road St Albans, Ludwick Way Welwyn, Marlborough Road St Albans, Oxlease Hatfield, Panshanger^{BCU}, Radlett United Free^{U}, St John's Potters Bar, Shenley
Bedfordshire, Essex and Hertfordshire		South Bedfordshire		22	Aley Green, Barton, Beech Hill Luton, All Saints Dagnall^{C}, Eaton Bray, Edlesborough, Farley Hill Luton, Gravenhurst, Harlington, High Street Leagrave, High Town Luton, Kensworth, Luton Road Dunstable, Mount Pleasant Leagrave, Oakdale Luton, St John's Luton, St Margaret's Luton, Strathmore Avenue Luton, The Square Dunstable, Toddington, Trinity Leighton Buzzard, Wigmore Luton^{U}
Bedfordshire, Essex and Hertfordshire		South Essex		11	Langdon Hills, St Paul's Basildon, Trinity Basildon, Billericay, Grays, Hordon-on-the-Hill, Linford, Stanford-le-Hope, Christ Church Wickford^{U}
Bedfordshire, Essex and Hertfordshire		Southend & Leigh		14	Belfairs Leigh-on-Sea, Benfleet, Canvey Island, Chalkwell Park, Hadleigh, Highlands Leigh-on-Sea, Hockley, Fishermen's Chapel Leigh-on-Sea, Rayleigh, Rochford, Thorpe Bay, Thundersley, Trinity Westcliff-on-Sea, Great Wakering, Shoebury, Wesley Leigh-on-Sea
Bedfordshire, Essex and Hertfordshire		Tendring		13	Ardleigh, Brightlingsea United^{U}, Dovercourt Central^{U}, Emmanuel Walton^{U}, Frinton, Great Bentley, Great Clacton, Great Holland, Holland on Sea, Jaywick, Manningtree, Trinity Clacton, Upper Dovercourt
Bedfordshire, Essex and Hertfordshire		West Herts & Borders		22	Studham, Gaddesden Row, Markyate, Flamstead, Redbourn, High Street Harpenden, Southdown Harpenden, Batford, St Martha's Tring, All Saints Berkhamsted^{C}, Ley Hill, Hemel Hempstead, Kings Langley, Abbots Langley, The Scroll Watford^{U}, Trinity Watford, Croxley Green, Bushey & Oxhey, Berry Lane Rickmansworth, St Mary's Rickmansworth^{C}, St Andrew's Bushey Heath, Carpenders Park & South Oxhey
Birmingham		Birmingham		34	Acocks Green, Beacon Pheasey^{C}, Birmingham Chinese, Cambridge Road King's Heath, Carrs Lane^{U}, Castle Bromwich, Coleshill United^{U}, Cotteridge^{CU}, Dorridge, Earlswood, Great Barr, Hall Green United Community Church^{MU}, Hawksley^{C}, Hazelwell^{C}, Longbridge, Lozells, Lyndon, Maypole, Whitacre, Northfield, Perry Barr, Perry Hall, Saltley, Selly Oak, Shirley, Solihull, South Yardley, Sparkhill, St Andrew's Chelmsley Wood^{C}, St Andrew's Stirchley, St Michael's Hall Green^{C}, Trinity Monkspath^{BCS}, Villa Road, Water Orton
Birmingham		Sutton Park		13	Blackwood, Boldmere, Erdington, Falcon Lodge, Four Oaks, Kingsbury, Kingstanding, Nechells, South Parade Sutton Coldfield, St Chad's Erdington^{C}, Stockland Green, Streetly, Witton
Birmingham		Birmingham (West) & Oldbury		12	Akrill, Causeway Green, City Road Birmingham, Court Oak, Ladywood, Quinton, Ridgacre, Rounds Green, St John's Smethwick, Tipton Road Tividale, Warley Woods, West Smethwick
Birmingham		Blackheath & Halesowen		6	Central Blackheath, Crossway Halesowen, Hasbury, Hurst Green, Romsley, Short Cross
Birmingham		Bromsgrove & Redditch		10	Alcester, Bromsgrove, Catshill, Crabbs Cross, Emmanuel Redditch^{U}, Lickey End, Rowney Green, St Andrew's Church Hill, Studley, The Bridge Redditch^{C}
Birmingham		Coventry & Nuneaton		15	Wesley Hall Arley, Trinity Atherstone^{U}, Balsall Common, Bedworth, Central Hall Coventry, Ebenezer Collycroft, Earlsdon, St Mary & All Saints Fillongley^{C}, Horeston Grange Ecumenical^{CU}, Meriden, Nuneaton, Radford & Holbrooks, Ridge Lane, Ryton, Woodside Coventry
Birmingham		Herefordshire (South & East)		4	Ledbury, Christ Church Ross-on-Wye^{U}, Bromyard, St John's Hereford
Birmingham		South West Worcestershire		12	Bromyard Road Worcester, Ombersley Road Worcester, Lansdowne Crescent Malvern, St Andrew's Worcester, Droitwich, Norton, Somers Park Malvern Link, St Nicholas Warndon^{C}, Upper Welland Malvern Wells, Broadway, Evesham, Willersey
Birmingham		South Warwickshire		16	Kenilworth, St Michael's Stockton^{C}, Warwick, Wellesbourne, Whitnash, Cubbington, Dale Street Leamington Spa, Henley-in-Arden, Stratford-upon-Avon, Radford Road Leamington Spa^{U}, Bidford-on-Avon, Mickleton, Tysoe, Welford-on-Avon, Fenny Compton, Kineton
Birmingham		Tamworth & Lichfield		8	Lichfield, New Life Aldergate Tamworth, Glascote, Alrewas, New Life Thackeray Drive Tamworth, Trinity Shenstone, St Martin's Stoneydelph^{C}, Hopwas
Bolton & Rochdale		Bolton		11	Ainsworth, Chew Moor, Edgworth, Harwood, Hawkshaw, St Andrew's Bolton, St Helen's Road Bolton, St John's Road Horwich, The Triangle Bolton, Trinity Bolton, Westhoughton
Bolton & Rochdale		Bolton Mission		1	Victoria Hall Bolton
Bolton & Rochdale		Bury		15	Bolton Road Bury, Brandlesholme Bury, Bridge Community Church Radcliffe, Christ Church Ramsbottom^{B}, Edenfield, Heaton Park, Holcombe Brook, Jericho, Prestwich, Rowlands Summerseat, Seedfield, Tottington, Trinity Heywood, Wesley Radcliffe, Whitefield
Bolton & Rochdale		Farnworth & Worsley		8	Boothstown, Christ Church Little Lever^{U}, Kearsley Mount, St Catherine's Highfield^{C}, Trinity Farnworth^{Co}, Walkden, Wharton & Cleggs Lane^{U}, Worsley Road North
Bolton & Rochdale		Leigh & Hindley		11	Astley & Tyldesley, Atherton Central, Bag Lane, Bamfurlong, Bedford (Leigh), Culcheth, Glazebury, Hindley Green, Kingsleigh, St John's Hindley, Wigan Road Leigh
Bolton & Rochdale		Rochdale & Littleborough		13	Brimrod, Castleton Moor, Dearnley, Greenhill, Moorhouse, Norden, St Andrew's Rochdale^{U}, Smithy Bridge, Spotland, Syke, Thrum Hall, Trinity Rochdale, Wardle Village Church^{C}
Bolton & Rochdale		Rossendale		7	Bacup Central, Irwell Vale, Longholme Rawtenstall, Newchurch, Rakefoot Crawshawbooth, Shawforth, Stacksteads
Bolton & Rochdale		Wigan		13	Aspull, Bispham, Blackrod, Clowes, Crooke, Goose Green, Ince, Orrell Post, Queen's Hall Wigan, Shevington, Standish, The Vale Appley Bridge, Spencer Road Whitley
Bristol		Bristol & South Gloucestershire		42	Alveston, Badminton Road Downend, Bethesda Redfield, Bishopston, Easter Compton, Eastville Park, Eden Grove Horfield, Fishponds, Hanham, Hawkesbury Upton, Holy Trinity Bradley Stoke^{C}, Horfield, Kingswood, Longwell United^{C}, Wesley Made-For-Ever, Olveston & Tockington, Parkway Bristol, Potters Wood Kingswood, Sea Mills, Shirehampton, Shortwood, Bedminster, St Peter's Brislington, Knowle, Totterdown, Speedwell, St Andrew's Filton, St Chad's Patchway^{C}, Staple Hill, Summerhill, St Peter's Pilning^{C}, Thornbury, Unity Oldland, Victoria Bristol, Salem Watley's End, Wesley Memorial Bristol, Westbury-on-Trym, Westbury Park^{C}, Winterbourne Down, Withywood^{C}, Yate, Zion United Frampton Cotterell^{U}
Bristol		Gloucestershire		41	Holy Trinity Amberley^{C}, Apperley, Aylburton, Bailey Lane End, Barton Street Gloucester, Bethesda Cheltenham, Bishop's Cleeve, Bream, Brimscombe, Cam, Chalford Hill, Christ Church Abbeydale^{BCU}, Christ Church Nailsworth^{BU}, Churchdown, Cinderford, Ashcroft Cirencester^{U}, Clements End, Coalway, Drybrook, Dursley, Eastington, Fairford United^{U}, Hartpury, Hawling, Hucclecote, Lonsdale Road Gloucester, St Mary's Newent^{BC}, Pillowell, Quedgeley, St John the Baptist's Randwick^{C}, South Cerney United^{Co}, St John's Northgate Gloucester, St Mark's Cheltenham, Stonehouse, Stroud, Christ Church Tetbury^{U}, Tewkesbury, Holy Trinity Tibberton^{C}, St Michael's Whaddon^{C}, Winchcombe, Wotton-Under-Edge United^{Co}
Bristol		Gordano Valley		8	Backwell West Town, Christchurch Clevedon^{C}, Kenn Road Clevedon, Nailsea, Pill, Portishead, Redcliffe Bay Portishead, Yatton
Bristol		North East Somerset & Bath		16	Horizon Bath, Nexus Bath, Weston Bath, Bathampton, Beechen Cliff, Box, Chew Stoke, Farrington Gurney, Keynsham, Midsomer Norton, Paulton, Peasedown St John, Southdown, Timsbury, Trinity Radstock, Trinity Westfield
Bristol		North Wiltshire		19	Aldbourne, Bath Road Swindon, Central Chippenham, Central Swindon^{BU}, Chiseldon^{C}, Christ Church Marlborough, Luckington, Lyneham, Pewsey, Rodbourne, Sheldon Road Chippenham, Sherston, St Andrew's Swindon, St Paul's Dorcan^{C}, St Timothy's Dorcan^{C}, Stratton, Studley, Cleverton, Great Somerford
Bristol		Somerset Mendip		18	Axbridge, Banwell, Castle Cary, Cheddar, Churchill, Coleford, Congresbury, Frome Wesley, Glastonbury, Keinton Mandeville, Norton Down, Oakhill, Pilton, Rode Chapel^{B}, West Street Somerton^{U}, Street, Wedmore, Wells
Bristol		Upper Thames		12	Christ the Servant Abbey Meads^{BCU}, Braydon, Cricklade United^{U}, Highworth, Longcot, Lydiard Tregoze^{C}, Purton^{C}, Royal Wootton Bassett, Shaw^{C}, Shrivenham, Toothill^{C}, Westlea^{C}
Bristol		Weston & Burnham		9	Brean, St Andrew's Bournville^{C}, Brent Knoll, Burnham-on-Sea, East Brent, Locking Castle^{BCU}, Milton, Uphill, West Huntspill
Bristol		Wiltshire United Area		16	Bradford-on-Avon United^{U}, Bromham, Calne, St Aldhelm's Corsham^{U}, St Andrew's Devizes^{U}, Hilperton, Marston, Melksham United^{U}, Semington^{C}, Steeple Ashton, Trowbridge United^{U}, Wesley Road Trowbridge, Warminster United^{U}, Westbury, Whitley, Winsley
Chester & Stoke-on-Trent		Dane & Trent		16	Biddulph, Bosley, Brookhouse Green, Cloud, Davenport, Goostrey, Hill Top Biddulph Moor, Holmes Chapel, Key Green, Lower Withington, Middlewich, Mow Cop, New Road Biddulph Moor, Rood Lane Congleton, Trinity Congleton, Wellspring Congleton
Chester & Stoke-on-Trent		Market Drayton		2	Ashley, Market Drayton
Chester & Stoke-on-Trent		Mid Cheshire		16	Barnton, Castle^{U}, Chester Road Winsford, Comberbach, Davenham, Hartford, Little Budworth, Lostock Green, Northwich, Pickmere, Sandiway, Shurlach Northwich, St Andrews Winsford, Trinity Winsford, Weaver Winsford, Weaverham^{C}
Chester & Stoke-on-Trent		North Cheshire		24	Frodsham, Norley, Blakelees Kingsley, Helsby, Hurst Kingsley, Oakmere, Kelsall, Mickle Trafford, Tarvin, Christleton, Rowton, Caldy Valley Great Boughton^{U}, Garden Lane Uniting^{U}, Hoole, Tarporley^{B}, Bretton, Saltney, Saughall, Wesley Chester, The Heath, Halton Trinity, Wicksten Drive, St Mark's Runcorn, Bethesda Runcorn
Chester & Stoke-on-Trent		North Staffordshire		10	Audley, Baldwins Gate, Bradwell, Cross Heath, Halmer End, Higherland, Madeley, St Luke's Clayton, Silverdale, Wolstanton
Chester & Stoke-on-Trent		South Cheshire		29	Oakhanger^{C}, Wesley Place, Englesea Brook, Audlem, Hankelow, Woore, St John's Whitchurch, Tallarn Green, Brown Knowl, Crewe-by-Farndon, Malpas, Coppenhall, St Mark's Crewe, St Stephen's Crewe, Haslington, Winterley, Poole, Broad Lane, Nantwich, Shavington, St John's Willaston, Wells Green, Elworth, Ettiley Heath^{C}, Unity Sandbach, Baddiley, Broomhall, Lightwood Green, St Andrew's Aston
Chester & Stoke-on-Trent		Staffordshire Moorlands		12	Boundary, Cheadle, Endon, Ipstones, Onecote, Rudyard, Rushton, St Andrew's Cheddleton, Tean, Trinity Leek^{U}, Waterhouses, Wetley Rocks
Chester & Stoke-on-Trent		Stoke-on-Trent Mission		5	Oasis Biddulph, Potters Church, Swan Bank, Wesley Hall, Whitehill Kidsgrove
Chester & Stoke-on-Trent		Stoke-on-Trent North		9	Baddeley Edge, Brown Edge, Bucknall, Fegg Hayes, Milton, Norton, Salem, Tunstall, Werrington
Chester & Stoke-on-Trent		Stoke-on-Trent South		9	Blythe Bridge & Forsbrook, Broadway, Fenton Park, Lightwood, Longton Central Hall, Sandford Hill, Temple Street, Trentham, West End
Cornwall & Isles of Scilly		Bodmin, Padstow & Wadebridge		11	Bodmin, Innis, Lanivet, Millpool, Nanstallon, Padstow, Rock, Rosenannon, St Mawgan, Trelights, Cornerstone Wadebridge
Cornwall & Isles of Scilly		Callington & Gunnislake		4	Callington, Stoke Climsland, St Dominick, Tamar Valley (Albaston)
Cornwall & Isles of Scilly		Camborne, Redruth & Hayle		14	Angarrack, Barripper, Beacon, Wesley Camborne, Centenary Camborne, Four Lanes & Pencoys^{C}, Gateway Porth an Dre, Hayle, Illogan Highway, Kehelland, Mawla, Porthtowan, Troon, Wall
Cornwall & Isles of Scilly		Camelford & Week St Mary		14	Canworthy Water, Bethel Trelash, Maxworthy, Rehoboth Tresmeer, Tresparrett, Week St Mary, Boscastle, Bossiney, Camelford, St Breward, St Tudy, Treveighan, Tintagel, Delabole
Cornwall & Isles of Scilly		Falmouth & Gwennap		15	Falmouth, Carharrack, Carnkie, Edgcumbe, Frogpool, Lanner, Mawnan Smith, Mylor, Penmarth, Penryn, Perranwell, Ponsanooth, St Day, Stithians, Trenoweth
Cornwall & Isles of Scilly		Fore Street St Ives		1	Fore Street St Ives
Cornwall & Isles of Scilly		Isles of Scilly		2	St Mary's, St Martin's
Cornwall & Isles of Scilly		Launceston Area		12	Launceston Central, Boyton, Coads Green, Lewannick^{C}, Lifton, Pipers Pool, Polyphant, South Petherwin, Tregadillett^{C}, Trebullet, Yeolmbridge, Linkinhorne^{C}
Cornwall & Isles of Scilly		Liskeard & Looe		10	Connon, Dobwalls, Liskeard, Mount, Pelynt, Pensilva, Polperro, Riverside United (West Looe)^{U}, St Neot, Trevelmond
Cornwall & Isles of Scilly		The Lizard & Mounts Bay		15	Balwest, Breaney, Helston Central, Cury, Crowlas, Goldsithney, Leedstown, Meneage, Marazion, Mullion, Porthleven, Ruan Minor, Lizard, Trinity Porkellis, St Keverne United
Cornwall & Isles of Scilly		Newquay, Perranporth & St Agnes		7	Crantock, Cubert, Mount Hawke, Newquay, Perranporth, Rose, St Agnes
Cornwall & Isles of Scilly		St Austell		20	Bethel St Austell, Bugle, Carclaze, Gunwen, Indian Queens, Leek Seed, Lostwithiel, Mevagissey, Mount Charles, Nanpean, Par, Polgooth, Roche, St Dennis, St John's St Austell, Stenalees, Tregrehan, Trinity Trewoon, Tywardreath, Whitemoor
Cornwall & Isles of Scilly		Saltash		9	Wesley Saltash, Bealbury, Blunts, Burraton, Crafthole, Downderry, Landrake, St Germans, St Ive
Cornwall & Isles of Scilly		Truro		15	Allet, Carnon Downs, Chacewater, Devoran, Feock, Hicks Mill, Penpoll, All Saints Portloe^{C}, Portscatho, Shortlanesend, Threemilestone, Tresillian, Trispen, Twelveheads, Truro
Cornwall & Isles of Scilly		West Cornwall		18	Bible Christian (St Ives), Wesley Carbis Bay, Centenary Newlyn, Chapel Street Penzance, Chy an Gweal Carbis Bay, Drift, Escalls, Gulval, Hellesveor, High Street Penzance, Madron, Mousehole, St Buryan, St Erth, St Just, Trinity Newlyn, United St Ives, Wesley Rock Heamoor
Cumbria		Kendal		9	Arnside, Cowan Bridge, Fellside (Kendal), Kirkby Lonsdale, Levens, Sandylands (Kendal), Storth^{C}, Stricklandgate (Kendal)
Cumbria		Western Fells		12	Bassenthwaite^{C}, Brigham, Cleator Moor, Cockermouth, Egremont, Frizington, Gosforth, Hensingham, Keswick, Lamplugh Kirkland & Ennerdale^{C}, Seascale^{C}, Whitehaven
Cumbria		Kirkby Stephen, Appleby & Tebay		18	The Sands Appleby, Dufton with Knock, Bolton, Kings Meaburn, Crosby Ravensworth, Great Asby, Warcop, Kirkby Stephen, Soulby, Crosby Garrett United^{B}, Nateby, Winton^{B}, Brough, Brough Sowerby, Tebay, Orton, Newbiggin-on-Lune, Ravenstonedale
Cumbria		Kirkoswald & Alston Moor		7	Alston, Ainstable, Gamblesby, Kirkoswald, Langwathby, Renwick, Salkeld Dykes
Cumbria		North Cumbria		14	Brampton, Dalston, Gilsland, Longtown, Monkhill, Newtown, Solway, Thursby, Thurstonfield, Tithe Barn (Carlisle), Upperby (Carlisle), Walton, Wetheral, Wigton Road (Carlisle)
Cumbria		Penrith		7	Cottage Wood Centre (Plumpton), Patterdale^{C}, Penrith, Shap, Skelton, Sleagill, Stainton
Cumbria		Sedbergh		7	Cornerstone Sedbergh^{U}, Cautley, Dentdale, Dent Foot, Garsdale, Garsdale Street, Hawes Junction
Cumbria		Solway		5	Dearham, Workington United^{U}, Harrington, Maryport, Great Clifton
Cumbria		South Lakes		9	Ambleside, Cartmel, Coniston, Grange-over-Sands, Hawkshead, Swarthmoor, Ulverston, Windermere Carver^{U}, Windermere Methodist
Cumbria		South West Cumbria United Area		8	Askam, Beacon Hill (Barrow), Dalton Community Church^{U}, Hartington Street (Barrow), Kirkby, Millom, Trinity Barrow^{U}, Vickerstown
Cumbria		Wigton		1	Cornerstone Wigton
Darlington		Darlington & Teesdale		10	Barton, Barnard Castle, Cockerton, Elm Ridge, Harrowgate Hill, Haughton, Hurworth, Staindrop, The Pathway Middleton-in-Teesdale, The Well Darlington
Darlington		Middlesbrough & Eston	https://memc.uk/]	8	Grove Hill, Linthorpe Methodist Hub, Marton, Normanby, Nunthorpe, Trinity
Darlington		Stockton		10	Carlton, Trinity Eaglescliffe, Greens Lane, Maltby, North Billingham, Norton, St Andrew's, Thornaby, Yarm, Yarm Road
Darlington		Castle Eden		9	Blackhall Hartlepool, Central Estate Hartlepool, Coxhoe, Easington Colliery, Easington Village, Grange Road Hartlepool, Horden, Milbank, Peterlee
Darlington		Stokesley		6	Stokesley, Carlton, Great Ayton, Easby, Hutton Rudby, Seamer
Darlington		Cleveland & Danby		14	Brotton, Danby, Glaisdale Head, Guisborough, Hinderwell, Leaholm, Marske, Newcomen, New Marske, Saltburn, Skelton, Skinningrove, Westerdale, Zetland Park
Darlington		Bishop Auckland & Shildon		14	Auckland Park, Bishop Auckland, Cockfield, Etherley, Hamsterley^{BC}, Newton Aycliffe, Shildon, South Church, St Michael's Heighington^{C}, The Valley, Wind Mill, Witton Park, Witton-le-Wear, Woodhouse Close^{CU}
Darlington		Durham & Deerness Valley		11	Bearpark, Bowburn, Brandon, Carrville, Elvet Durham City, Esh Winning, Framwellgate Moor, Newton Hall^{C}, North Road Durham, Pittington, Sacriston
Darlington		West Durham		8	St Andrew's Crook^{U}, Ferryhill, Sedgefield, Spennymoor, Stanhope, Tudhoe, Willington, Wolsingham
Darlington		North Yorkshire Dales		11	Brompton-on-Swale, Carlton, Gayle, Gunnerside, Hunton, Leyburn, Marsett, Melmerby, Richmond, Scorton, West Burton
East Anglia		Bury St Edmunds		9	Bradfield, Christchurch Needham Market^{U}, Glemsford, Ixworth, Northumberland Avenue Bury St Edmunds, Trinity Bury St Edmunds, Old Newton, Stowmarket, Sudbury
East Anglia		Cambridge		11	Bar Hill^{BCU}, Cambourne^{BCU}, Castle Street Cambridge, Chesterton, Haslingfield, Histon, Orwell, Royston, Sawston Free^{U}, Toft^{C}, Wesley Cambridge
East Anglia		Central Norfolk		25	Beetley, Pilgrim Church Blakeney, Trinity Dereham, Fulmodeston, Garvestone, Great Cressingham, Great Ellingham, Gressenhall, Hingham, Holt, Litcham, Mattishall, New Holkham, Saham Hills, Sculthorpe & Fakenham, Sporle, Stibbard, Swaffham, Thursford, Tittleshall, Toftwood, Pilgrim Church Walsingham, Watton, Wells & Wighton, Wendling
East Anglia		Ely & Newmarket		14	Trinity Burwell^{U}, Emmanuel Chatteris^{BU}, Coveney, Ely, Haddenham, Little Downham^{C}, St John's Littleport, Christ Church Newmarket^{U}, Pymoor, Red Lodge Community Church^{C}, Saxon Street, Soham, Wicken, Wickhambrook
East Anglia		The Fens		10	Doddington, Emneth, Trinity March^{U}, Marshland St James, Murrow, Outwell, Parson Drove, Terrington St John, Upwell, Trinity Wisbech
East Anglia		Haverhill		1	Haverhill
East Anglia		Ipswich		22	Alan Road Ipswich, Bramford, Bramford Road Ipswich, Brantham, Capel St Mary, Chantry Ipswich, Chelmondiston, Elmsett, Framlingham United Free^{U}, Holbrook, Kelsale, Kirton, Knodishall, Landseer Road Ipswich, Leiston United^{U}, Museum Street Ipswich, Orford, Peasenhall & Sibton, Seaton Road Felixstowe, Trimley, Trinity Felixstowe, Woodbridge
East Anglia		Lowestoft & East Suffolk		9	Beccles^{U}, Corton, Kessingland, Loddon^{C}, Trinity Lowestoft, Norton Subcourse LEP, South Lowestoft, Southwold, Wenhaston
East Anglia		Norfolk Broads		17	Acle, Bradwell, Caister, Fleggburgh, Freethorpe, Lowestoft Road Gorleston, Magdalen Way Gorleston, Christ Church Great Yarmouth^{U}, Newtown Great Yarmouth, Hemsby, Horsey, Lingwood, Ludham, Martham, Potter Heigham, Sutton, Thurne
East Anglia		North Norfolk		14	Aylsham, Barton Turf, Cromer, Hickling, Gresham, Lessingham, North Walsham, Mundesley, Overstrand, Reepham, St Andrew's Sheringham, Sloley, Trunch, Weybourne
East Anglia		Norwich		23	Attleborough, Bowthorpe^{BCU}, Bowthorpe Road, Brooke, Costessey, Drayton, Forncett, Framingham Earl, Hethersett, Horsford, Mile Cross, Morley, Chapel Field Road Norwich, Heartsease Lane Norwich, Rosebery Road Norwich, St Faith's Horsham^{C}, St Peter's Norwich^{U}, Trinity Thorpe Marriott^{C}, Old Buckenham, Spixworth, Old Catton, Wroxham Road Sprowston, Wymondham
East Anglia		St Neots & Huntingdon		14	Alconbury^{C}, Barkley Street Eynesbury, Brampton, Buckden, Eaton Ford, Great Barford, Hilton, Huntingdon, Over, Ramsey, Sawtry, St Ives, Tempsford, Warboys
East Anglia		Thetford, Diss & Mildenhall		13	Beck Row, Botesdale, Brandon, Diss, East Harling, Garboldisham, Holywell Row, Hopton, Lakenheath, Mildenhall, Mundford, Stanton, Thetford
East Anglia		Waveney Valley Ecu. Partnership		4	Emmanuel Bungay^{U}, Fressingfield, Harleston^{U}, Pulham Market
East Anglia		West Norfolk		21	Burnham Market, Clenchwarton, Dersingham, Downham Market, Feltwell, St Faith's Gaywood^{C}, Heacham, Highgate King's Lynn, Hilgay, Hunstanton, London Road King's Lynn, Marham, North Lynn, Pott Row, Snettisham, Southery, South Wootton, Stanhoe, St Peter's Stowbridge^{C}, Terrington St Clement, Wimbotsham
Lancashire		Banks & Hesketh Bank			
Lancashire		Blackpool		4	Layton, Marton, New Central, South Shore
Lancashire		Burnley & Pendle		16	Barley, Briercliffe Road Burnley^{B}, Brierfield, Brunshaw, Central Burnley, Christ Church Nelson, Greenbrook, Hapton, Higherford, Padiham Road Burnley, Parkside, St Andrew's Barnoldswick, St John's Colne, St Peter's Earby, Southfield, Wheatley Lane
Lancashire		Chorley & Leyland		12	Adlington^{U}, Hillside Brinscall, Buckshaw Village^{C}, Chorley, Coppull, Eccleston, Euxton, Heskin, Leyland, Midge Hall, Whittle-le-Woods, Withnell Fold
Lancashire		Clitheroe		5	Chatburn, Paythorne, Trinity Clitheroe, Waddington, Whalley
Lancashire		Great Harwood		3	Clayton-le-Moors, Rishton, Trinity Great Harwood^{U}
Lancashire		North Fylde		6	Cleveleys Park, Fleetwood, Lighthouse, Pilling, Poulton-le-Fylde, Thornton
Lancashire		North Lancashire		19	
Lancashire		Preston Ribble		12	Ashton, Bamber Bridge, Central Preston, Christ Church Longridge^{U}, Trinity Cottam, Fulwood, Hoole, Hope, Ingol, Kingsfold, Penwortham, Trinity Gregson Lane
Lancashire		South Fylde		6	Church Road St Annes, Fairhaven, Freckleton, Kirkham, Lytham, The Drive St Annes
Lancashire		West Pennine Moors		13	Antley, Cambridge Street Accrington, Darwen, Feniscowles, Haslingden, Lammack, Mellor, Rhyddings, St Paul's Blackburn, Stanhill, Trinity Darwen^{U}, West End, Wilpshire
Lincolnshire		Barton & Brigg		10	Barrow-upon-Humber, Barton-upon-Humber, Brigg, Broughton, East Halton, Goxhill, Hibaldstow, St Andrew's Kirton-in-Lindsey^{C}, Waddingham, Wrawby
Lincolnshire		Boston		9	Centenary Boston, Frithville, Gipsey Bridge, Hospital Bridge, Kirton, Stickney, Swineshead, Wrangle, Zion Boston
Lincolnshire		East Lincolnshire		17	Alford, Burgh-le-Marsh, Chapel St Leonards, Conisholme, Grainthorpe, Grimoldby, Louth, St Peter's Mablethorpe, Marshchapel, Saltfleet, Saltfleetby^{C}, Skegness, Sutton-on-Sea, Thorpe Fen Dykes, Trusthorpe, Wainfleet, Withern
Lincolnshire		Epworth & Scunthorpe		16	Althorpe, Ashby, Beltoft, Burton-upon-Stather, Crowle, Ealand, Epworth, Gunness, Haxey, Messingham, Old Brumby, Owston Ferry, West Butterwick, Winteringham, Winterton, Yaddlethorpe
Lincolnshire		Grimsby & Cleethorpes		14	The Haven, Healing, Humberston, Immingham, Keelby, New Waltham, North Thoresby, Scartho, Side Door, South Killingholme, St Andrew's, St Christopher's, Tetney, Waltham
Lincolnshire		Lincoln		18	Bailgate Lincoln, Burton Road Lincoln, Central Lincoln, Cherry Willingham, Monk's Road Lincoln, Moorland Park Lincoln, Navenby, Nettleham, North Hykeham, Reepham, Scothern, St Columba's Lincoln^{U}, St Giles Lincoln, Skellingthorpe, Swallowbeck Lincoln, Thorpe on the Hill^{C}, Washingborough, Welton
Lincolnshire		Mid Lincolnshire		11	Bardney, Bardney Dairies, Coningsby, Halton, Horncastle, Old Bolingbroke, Scamblesby, Spilsby, Toynton, Woodhall Spa, Wragby
Lincolnshire		Sleaford		7	Billinghay, Dunston, Heckington, Little Hale, Ruskington, Sleaford, Timberland
Lincolnshire		South Holland		9	Bicker, Gosberton, Gosberton Clough, Holbeach, Holbeach Drove, Lutton Marsh, Moulton Chapel, Spalding Broad Street, Sutterton
Lincolnshire		The Wolds & Trent		12	Brookenby^{C}, Caistor, Gainsborough, Glentham, Lea, Market Rasen, Marton, Middle Rasen, Misterton, Nettleton, North Kelsey, Upton
London		Barking, Dagenham & Ilford		9	Barking, Barkingside, Beacontree Heath, Gantshill, Goodmayes, Ilford, Old Dagenham, Seven Kings, The Drive (Redbridge)
London		Barnet & Queensbury		9	Barnet & Brookside, East Finchley, Edgware, Finchley, Trinity Golders Green^{U}, Hendon, Manor Drive (Friern Barnet), Trinity Mill Hill^{U}, Queensbury
London		Battersea & Wandle Valley		7	Battersea Central, Broomwood, Mitcham, St Helier, St John's Wandsworth, Tooting, Upper Tooting
London		Blackheath & Crystal Palace		9	Anerley, Burnt Ash, Eltham Park, Forest Hill, Hither Green, Lewisham, Sunfields Blackheath, Upper Norwood, Wesley Hall Sydenham
London		Bromley		3	Beckenham, Bromley, West Wickham
London		Chelsea, Hammersmith & Fulham		5	Askew Road Shepherds Bush^{U}, Chelsea, Fulham Broadway, Rivercourt, Shepherds Bush Road
London		City Road		1	Wesley's Chapel
London		Croydon		8	Addington, Christ Church Addiscombe, Downsview Upper Norwood, Norbury, Parchmore, Shirley, South Norwood, West Croydon
London		Ealing Trinity		8	Acton Hill^{U}, Ealing Green^{U}, Greenford, Hanwell, King's Hall Southall, Kingsdown West Ealing, Northolt, Pitshanger
London		Enfield		8	Bush Hill Park, Edmonton, Goffs Oak, Grange Park, Ordnance Road Enfield, Ponders End, The Bourne Southgate, Trinity Enfield^{U}
London		Forest		12	Cann Hall, Trinity Leyton, Leytonstone, Lighthouse Walthamstow, Loughton, Trinity Debden, North Chingford, Shernhall, South Chingford, Wanstead, Winchester Road (Highams Park), Woodford
London		Hackney & Stoke Newington		5	Clapton, Clapton Park, Dalston, Mare Street Hackney, Stoke Newington
London		Harlesden		1	Harlesden
London		Harrow & Hillingdon		16	Cannon Lane, Christ Church Uxbridge^{U}, Eastcote, Hayes, Hayes End, Kenton, North Harrow, North Hillingdon, Northwood, Pinner, Ruislip, Ruislip Manor, South Harrow, Trinity Harrow^{U}, Wealdstone, Yiewsley
London		Islington & Camden Mission		5	Archway, Caledonian Road, Camden Town, Epworth Euston, Islington Central
London		Kingston-upon-Thames		4	Chessington, Kingston-upon-Thames, New Malden, Surbiton Hill
London		Lambeth		9	Brixton Hill, Clapham, Lambeth Mission & St Mary's, Mostyn Road (Stockwell), Railton Road (Brixton), Springfield (Stockwell), Stockwell, Streatham, Tulse Hill
London		Lesnes Abbey		11	Abbey Wood, Barnehurst, Belvedere, Bexleyheath, Church of the Cross Thamesmead^{CU}, St Mark's United Greenwich^{U}, Pantiles, St Paul's Thamesmead^{CU}, Trinity Plumstead, Welling, Wesley Hall Plumstead
London		London Mission North West		4	Fernhead Road, Gospel Oak, Kensal Rise, Kilburn
London		New River		9	Finsbury Park, Holly Park, Middle Lane Hornsey, Miller Memorial Tottenham, Muswell Hill, Ravensdale Road Stamford Hill, St Mark's Tottenham, Trinity at Bowes, Willoughby Road Hornsey
London		Newham		7	Bryant Street Stratford, Forest Gate, High Street South (East Ham), Keir Hardie (Canning Town), Manor Park, Pilgrims Way (East Ham), Newtown Stratford
London		Notting Hill		1	Notting Hill
London		Orpington & Chislehurst		8	Bromley Common, Chelsfield, Chislehurst, Emmanuel Sidcup^{U}, Mottingham, New Eltham, Orpington, Petts Wood
London		Purley		6	Caterham, Coulsdon, Sanderstead, South Croydon United^{U}, Warlingham, Whitethorn Avenue (Sutton)
London		Richmond & Hounslow		6	Barnes, Chiswick, Hounslow, Putney, Raleigh Road United^{U}, Roehampton
London		Romford		10	Brentwood, Farmlands (Doddingshurst), Gidea Park, Harold Wood, Havering Road Romford, Hornchurch, Rainham, South Ockendon, Trinity Romford, Upminster
London		Southwark & Deptford		7	Bermondsey Central, Christ Church East Dulwich^{U}, Deptford Mission, Herne Hill United^{U}, Manor Bermondsey, Peckham, Walworth
London		Sutton		8	Banstead, Carshalton, Cheam, Epsom, St John's Belmont^{C}, Trinity Sutton^{U}, St Mark's Tattenham Corner^{C}, Wallington
London		Teddington		5	East Molesey, Hampton, Hanworth, Sunbury, Teddington
London		Tower Hamlets		4	Bethnal Green, Bow Road, Old Ford, Poplar
London		Wembley		4	Ealing Road, Neasden, Park Lane, Sudbury
London		West London Mission		2	Hinde Street, King's Cross
London		Westminster		6	Central Hall Westminster, Christ Church with St Philip (Worcester Park)^{C}, Martin Way Morden, Lantern (Raynes Park & Wimbledon), Ruxley^{C}, Stoneleigh
South East		Berkshire Surrey Borders		8	Bracknell, Wokingham, Woosehill^{C}, Church @ The Pines Bracknell^{C}, Crowthorne, Bagshot, Sandhurst & Yateley, High Cross Camberley^{U}
South East		Brighton & Hove		5	Dorset Gardens, Hove, Patcham, Stanford Avenue, Woodingdean
South East		Canterbury & East Kent		19	Birchington, Broadstairs, Challock, Faversham United^{U}, Garlinge, Greenstreet, Herne Bay United^{U}, Margate Union^{U}, Marshside, Monkton, Old Wives Lees, Hardres Street United (Ramsgate)^{U}, River (Dover), St Andrew's Shepherdswell^{C}, St John's Whitstable, St Peter's Canterbury, Sturry^{C}, The Beacon Dover^{U}, Trinity Deal^{U}
South East		Central Sussex United Area		18	Broadway United (Eastbourne)^{U}, Burgess Hill, Buxted, Christ Church Lewes^{U}, Chyngton, Cornerstone Uckfield^{U}, Cross in Hand, Cross Way Seaford^{U}, Crowborough United^{U}, Emmanuel Eastbourne^{U}, Gamelands, Hailsham, Haywards Heath, Hurstpierpoint, St Barnabas United (Eastbourne)^{U}, St Michael's Newhaven^{C}, The Haven Eastbourne^{C}, Trinity Willingdon^{BU}
South East		Dorking & Horsham		8	Cobham United^{U}, Effingham, Leatherhead, London Road Horsham, Partridge Green, Southwater, St Martin's Dorking^{C}, St Andrew's Roffey
South East		Gibraltar^{[a]}		3	Gibraltar, Sotogrande^{C}
South East		Hants-Surrey Border		12	Aldershot, Alton, Cove, Elvetham Heath, The Spire Farnham^{U}, Fleet, Frimley Green, Hale, Hartley Wintney, North Camp (Farnborough), Rowledge, The Chapel (Ash Vale)
South East		Hastings, Bexhill & Rye		12	Battle, Calvert Memorial Hastings, Christ Church Bexhill, Little Common, Ninfield, Pett, Rye, Sackville Road Bexhill, St Helen's Hastings, St Leonards-on-Sea, Trinity Broad Oak, Winchelsea
South East		Malta		1	St Andrew's Malta^{S}
South East		North Kent		27	Dene Holm Gravesend, Ebbsfleet Community Church, Gravesend, Hextable, Spital Street, Swanscombe, The Brent Dartford, Bearsted, The Church in Burham, Eccles, Kingswood^{C}, Larkfield, Peninsula Stoke, Peninsula Strood, St Luke's Rochester, Tonbridge Road Maidstone, Union Street Maidstone, Chinese Church (Gillingham), Hartlip, Newington, Sittingbourne, Third Avenue Gillingham, The Church in Hope Street (Sheerness)^{U}, St Alban's South Chatham^{C}, St David's South Chatham^{C}, St William's South Chatham^{C}, Christ Church Luton^{C}
South East		Redhill & East Grinstead		5	Horley, Redhill, Reigate, St Paul's Crawley, Trinity East Grinstead
South East		South Kent		17	Appledore, Charing, Good Shepherd Hamstreet^{C}, Dymchurch, Elham, Folkestone, Headcorn, Ashford United^{U}, Lydd, Lyminge, New Romney, Rhodes Minnis, Shadoxhurst, St Michael's Hythe^{C}, St Andrew's Cheriton, Tenterden, Wye
South East		Staines & Feltham		8	Staines, St Jude's United (Englefield Green)^{C}, Egham United^{U}, Southville, Ashford Common, Ashford, Laleham, Christ Church Feltham^{C}
South East		Thames Valley		11	Burnham, Colnbrook & Poyle United^{U}, Cookham Rise, Eton Wick, Hampshire Avenue Slough, High Street Maidenhead, Ledgers Road Slough, St Andrew's Slough, St Mark's Crescent Maidenhead, Windsor, Woodlands Park Maidenhead
South East		Weald of Kent		8	Otford, St Andrew's Paddock Wood^{C}, The Drive Sevenoaks, Tonbridge, Tunbridge Wells, East Peckham, Hawkhurst, Horsmonden
South East		West Sussex (Coast & Downs)		14	Bognor Regis, Christ Church Chichester^{U}, Felpham, Goring-by-Sea, Lancing, Littlehampton United^{U}, Offington Park, Rustington, Selsey, Shoreham-by-Sea, Southwick, Steyning, Trinity Storrington, Westergate
South East		Wey Valley		13	Addlestone, Byfleet, Cranleigh, Godalming United^{U}, Guildford St Mary's^{C}, Knaphill, Merrow, St Michael's Sheerwater^{C}, Stoughton, Walton-on-Thames, West Horsley, Weybridge, Woking Trinity
Wales Synod (English-speaking)		Bangor & Holyhead		5	Amlwch, Holyhead, Llanfairfechan, St Paul's Penmaenmawr^{U}, St John's Bangor
Wales Synod (English-speaking)		Bridgend		8	Bridgend United^{U}, Brynna, Cefn Cribwr, Bethel Gilfach Goch, Maesteg Central, Christ Church Ogmore Vale^{U}, Trinity Porthcawl^{U}, Wesley Tondu
Wales Synod (English-speaking)		Buckley & Deeside		12	Buckley Cross, Drury, Emmaus Flint, Highway Ewloe, Wesley Leeswood, Mold, Northop Hall, Pentrobin, Quaystone Chapel^{P}, Sandycroft, St Andrew's Connah's Quay, Trinity Penyffordd^{P}
Wales Synod (English-speaking)		Cardiff		17	Conway Road Cardiff, Ely, Radyr, St Paul's Butetown, Wesley Canton, Llandaff North, Llanishen, Taffs Well United^{B}, Wesley Caerphilly, Whitchurch, Cathays, Cyncoed, Rumney, St Andrew's Birchgrove, Pontprennau Community Church^{BUW}, Resurrection St Mellons^{BPUW}, Urdu Fellowship
Wales Synod (English-speaking)		Ceredigion		2	St Paul's Aberystwyth (English), St Thomas' Lampeter
Wales Synod (English-speaking)		Conwy & Prestatyn		9	St Paul's Abergele, St John's Conwy, St David's Craig-y-Don, Llanddulas, Old Colwyn, Rhos-on-Sea, Rhuddlan, St John's Llandudno, Trinity Prestatyn
Wales Synod (English-speaking)		Gwent Hills & Vales		28	Castle Street Abergavenny, Abertillery, Zion Beaufort Hill, Bedwas, Blackwood, Blaenau Gwent (Abertillery), Blaina, Cwmcelyn Blaina, Fairhill, Bethel Garndiffaith, Glasbury, Hope Pontnewydd, Llanelly Hill, Llanyrafon, Wesley Nantyglo, Newbridge, Panteg New Inn, Pontllanfraith, Pontnewynydd, Pontypool, Race, St James Ebbw Vale, Tredegar, Trinant, Trinity Abersychan, Tyllwyn, Upper Cwmbran, Bethel Beaufort
Wales Synod (English-speaking)		Mid-Glamorgan Mission		8	Aberdare, Cascade Penpedairheol, Newtown Mountain Ash, Norton Bridge, Rhondda Fach (Ferndale), Rhydyfelin, Treherbert, Ystrad Mynach
Wales Synod (English-speaking)		Neath Port Talbot		9	Cymmer, Glyncorrwg, Glynneath, Jersey Marine, Neath, North Cornelly, Sandfields, Skewen, Wesley Taibach
Wales Synod (English-speaking)		Newport & Lower Wye		20	Bishpool Ringland, Broad Oak, Caldicot, Chepstow, Crosskeys, Dan-y-Graig Risca^{PU}, Earlswood, Earlswood Valley, Gwehelog, Langstone, Llancloudy, Monmouth, Penycaemawr, Trinity Pontywaun^{CoP}, Rogiet, Shaftesbury Street Newport, St David's Risca^{W}, St Julian's Newport, Trellech, Trinity Newport
Wales Synod (English-speaking)		South West Wales		15	Burry Port, Wesley Carew, Wesley Carmarthen, Albany Haverfordwest^{U}, Merlin's Bridge Haverfordwest, Trinity Kidwelly, Hall Street Llanelli^{U}, Victoria Road Llanelli, Llangwm, Christ Church Milford Haven^{U}, Pembroke Ferry, Trinity Pontarddulais (English), Saundersfoot, Stepaside, St John's Tenby^{U}
Wales Synod (English-speaking)		Swansea & Gower		11	Brunswick, Capel y Nant Clydach, Morriston, Mumbles, Penlan, Sketty Uniting^{U}, Wesley Eaton Road Swansea, Horton, Murton, Pitton, Reynoldston
Wales Synod (English-speaking)		Vale of Glamorgan		8	Barry Uniting^{U}, Hope Church Cadoxton, Crossway Barry, Dinas Powys, Penarth, St Athan, St David's Barry, St John's Barry Island
Wales Synod (English-speaking)		Welshpool & Bro Hafren		6	Wesley Newtown, Caersws, Zoar Trefeglwys, Welshpool, Cefn Trewern, Pentre Llifior
Wales Synod (English-speaking)		Wrexham		11	Regent Street Wrexham, Caergwrle, Ruabon, Gresford, Ffrwd, Brymbo, Rhosddu, Llangollen, Overton, Rhosymedre
Synod Cymru (Welsh-speaking)		Cymru		57	Bathafarn Ruthin, Bethel Aberdyfi, Bethel Amlwch, Bethel Caerau, Bethel Cardiff, Bethel Crynant, Bethel Deganwy, Bethel Flint Mountain, Bethel Gronant, Bethel Prestatyn, Bethel Rhigos, Bethesda Llanfair, Carmel Moelfre, Cefnblodwel, Cnwch Coch, Cymdu, Cynfaen Calcoed, Disgwylfa Penmaen, Ebeneser Dolgellau, Ebeneser Eglwysbach, Ebeneser Trefor, Ebeneser Treuddyn, Ebeneser Tywyn, Eglwys Unedig Seilo Llandudno^{BIP}, Gwyddelwern, Horeb Betws-yn-Rhos, Horeb Colwyn Bay, Horeb Llanrwst, Horeb Oswestry, Jerusalem Wrexham, Llanarmon, Llanfyllin, Llangynog, Llanrhaeadr, Llansantffraid, Llansilin, Pencarnisiog, Pendref Denbigh, Pendref Mold, Penrhyndeudraeth, Pisgah Rhiwlas, Pontrobert, Preswylfa Llandudno Junction, Rehoboth Corwen, Rehoboth Llanbedrog, Salem Pentre Halkyn, Salem Rhyd-y-foel, Saron (Bethel, Gwynedd), Saron Gwaenynog, Seion Glyndyfrdwy, Seion Llangollen, Shiloh Tregarth, Soar Llanfyllin, St John's Lloc, St Paul's Aberystwyth (Welsh), Trinity Pontarddulais (Welsh), Y Briw, Ystumtuen
Scotland		Angus, Dundee & Perthshire		5	St John's Arbroath, Blairgowrie, Dundee, Montrose, Perth
Scotland		Ayrshire & Renfrewshire		3	Barrhead, Girvan, Paisley
Scotland		Forth Valley		11	Armadale, Edinburgh, Grahamston United^{CoS}, Granton United^{U}, Kirkcaldy, Livingston United^{CoES}, Rosyth, St Anne's Dunbar^{E}, Stirling, Tranent with Cockenzie, Wallacestone
Scotland		Inverness		1	Inverness
Scotland		North of Scotland		6	Aberdeen, Buckie, Cullen, Findochty, Peterhead, Portessie
Scotland		Strathclyde		12	Anniesland, Clydebank, St John's Dumfries^{E}, East Kilbride, Kilsyth, Milton, Netherton, New Stevenston, Partick, Pollokshaws, Shettleston, Woodlands
Shetland		Lerwick & Walls		9	Fair Isle, Lerwick, Scalloway, Whiteness, Vidlin, North Roe, East Yell, Haroldswick, Shetland Rural
Channel Islands		Bailiwick of Guernsey		12	Alderney, Bordeaux, Forest, Les Adams, Les Camps, Les Capelles, Rohais, Sark^{C}, St Pauls, St Martins, Torteval, Wesley St Peter Port
Channel Islands		Jersey		8	Bethesda (St Peter), Bethlehem (St Mary), Ebenezer (Trinity), Georgetown, St Helier, St Aubin, St Martin's, St Ouen
Isle of Man		Isle of Man		31	Abbeylands, Agneash, Baldrine, Ballabeg, Ballafesson, Ballagarey, Ballakilpheric, Barregarrow, Bride, Castletown, Colby, Cooil, Crosby, Glen Maye, Kerrowkeil, Kirk Michael, Laxey, Onchan, Orrisdale, Peel, Port Erin, Port St Mary, Promenade Douglas, Pulrose, Ramsey, Sandygate, St John's, Sulby, The Howe, Trinity Douglas, Union Mills
Liverpool					
Manchester and Stockport District		Alderley Edge & Knutsford			
Manchester and Stockport District		Altrincham			
Manchester and Stockport District		Ashton-under-Lyne			
Manchester and Stockport District		Bramhall & Wythenshawe			
Manchester and Stockport District		Buxton			
Manchester and Stockport District		Glossop			
Manchester and Stockport District		Hazel Grove & Poynton			
Manchester and Stockport District		High Peak			
Manchester and Stockport District		Hyde & Denton			
Manchester and Stockport District		Macclesfield Circuit			
Manchester and Stockport District		Manchester			
Manchester and Stockport District		Oldham & Saddleworth			
Manchester and Stockport District		Romiley			
Manchester and Stockport District		Sale			
Manchester and Stockport District		Salford			
Manchester and Stockport District		Shaw & Royton			
Manchester and Stockport District		Stockport			
Manchester and Stockport District		Stretford & Urmston			
Manchester and Stockport District		Whaley Bridge Uniting Partnership			

- Newcastle upon Tyne District
  - Bede Circuit; Chester-le-Street Circuit; East Durham Circuit; Lindisfarne Circuit; Newcastle upon Tyne Central & East Circuit; Newcastle upon Tyne West Circuit; North Shields & Whitley Bay Circuit; North West Durham Circuit; South East Northumberland Ecumenical Area; South West Tyneside Circuit; Sunderland Circuit; Tynedale Circuit
- Nottingham and Derby District
  - Alfreton (Watchorn) Circuit a.k.a. Borders Mission; Ashbourne Circuit; Derby Circuit; Grantham & Vale of Belvoir Circuit; Mid Derbyshire Circuit; National Forest East Circuit; Newark & Southwell Circuit; Nottingham East Circuit; Nottingham North Circuit; Nottingham South Circuit; Nottingham Trent Valley Circuit; Sherwood Forest Circuit; South Derbyshire Circuit; Trent & Dove Circuit
  - Nottingham Central Mission operates independently
- Northampton District
  - Amersham Circuit; Banbury Circuit; Buckingham, Bicester & Brackley Circuit; Chipping Norton & Stow Circuit;East Mercia( replaced Kettering and corby, market harborough and rugby and daventry in september 2022) High Wycombe Circuit; Hinckley Circuit; Leicester (Trinity) Circuit; Leicester (West) Circuit, loughborough circuit; Melton Mowbray Circuit; Milton Keynes Circuit; Nene Valley Circuit; Northampton Circuit; Oxford Circuit; Peterborough circuit, Stamford Circuit; Vale of Aylesbury Circuit; Wantage & Abingdon Circuit; Witney & Faringdon Circuit
- Plymouth and Exeter District
  - Bude & Holsworthy Circuit; Exeter, Coast & Country Circuit; Ilfracombe & Barnstaple Circuit; Plymouth & Devonport Circuit; Ringsash Circuit; South Devon Circuit; South Molton & Ringsash Circuit; South Peverton & Crewkerne Circuit; Taunton Deane & Sedgemoor Circuit; Tavistock Circuit; Teignbridge Circuit; Tiverton & Wellington Circuit; Torbay Circuit; Torridge Circuit; West Devon Circuit; West Somerset Circuit
  - Plymouth Methodist Mission operates independently
- Sheffield District ^{[b]}
  - Barnsley Circuit; Bolsover & Staveley Circuit; Chesterfield Circuit; Doncaster Circuit; The Peak Circuit; Rotherham & Dearne Valley Circuit; Sheffield Circuit; Trinity Circuit
- Southampton District
  - Basingstoke & Reading Circuit; Bridport & Dorchester Circuit; Christchurch & Wimborne Circuit; East Solent & Downs Circuit; Isle of Wight Circuit; Kennet & Test Valley Circuit; Meon Valley Circuit; Poole Bay Circuit; Portland Circuit; Salisbury Circuit; Southampton Circuit; Weymouth Circuit; Winchester, Eastleigh & Romsey Circuit; Yeovil & Blackmore Vale Circuit;
- Wolverhampton and Shrewsbury District
  - The Black Country Circuit; Brownhills & Willenhall Circuit; Cannock Chase Circuit; Dudley & Netherton Circuit; Gornal & Sedgley Circuit; Kidderminster & Stourport Circuit; Shropshire & Marches Circuit; Stafford Circuit; Telford Circuit; Vale of Stour Circuit; Walsall Circuit; Wolverhampton Circuit
- Yorkshire North and East District ^{[b]}
  - Beverley Circuit; Bridlington Circuit; Driffield-Hornsea Circuit; Goole & Selby Circuit; Hull Centre & West Circuit; Nidd Valley Circuit; North Yorkshire Coast Circuit; Pateley Bridge Circuit; Pocklington & Market Weighton Circuit; Ripon & Lower Dales Circuit; Ryedale Circuit; South Holderness Circuit; Tadcaster Circuit; Thirsk & Northallerton Circuit; York Circuit
- Yorkshire West District ^{[b]}
  - Aire & Calder Circuit; Airedale Circuit; Bradford North Circuit; Bradford South Circuit; Calderdale Circuit; Denby Dale & Clayton West Circuit; Huddersfield Circuit; Leeds North & East Circuit; Leeds South & West Circuit; North Kirklees & Morley Circuit; Settle Circuit; Skipton & Grassington Circuit; Wharfedale & Aireborough Circuit;

Notes

a. The Gibraltar Circuit became part of the then London South West District in 1997, and is now a circuit in the South East District. The Methodist/Church of Scotland LEP in Malta is also part of the South East District.
b. On 1 September 2017, the four former districts in Yorkshire were reduced to three: Yorkshire North and East, Yorkshire West and Sheffield.

== Titles and officeholders ==
The people involved in Methodist organisation are as follows.

Early Methodism, as organised by Wesley, had "local preachers" and "travelling preachers". A local preacher was a layman appointed to preach within his own circuit. A travelling preacher, or "minister" (specifically, a presbyter) in modern Methodism, is appointed by Conference to serve for a limited time in a circuit and then move around the country to any other circuit where Conference may send him. In Wesley's time, this could be as little as a few months. As Methodism became more settled as a denomination, this was from one to four years, now typically five to ten years. In recent years, some circuits may also have lay pastors.

The non-pastoral work is done by "church stewards" and "circuit stewards". These are appointed to various functions, such as treasurer, or property steward, etc. to look after various practical needs. Usually these are voluntary workers, but some situations also require paid staff.

=== Structure ===
Methodism holds in principle 'the priesthood of all believers', which is a Protestant doctrine that all true Christians have equal access to God, and Church offices are functional rather than hierarchical. So while this list implies a chain of authority, it is of function rather than rank.

==== President and Vice-President of Conference ====
The president of conference is a presbyter, with the vice-president being a layperson or deacon. The one exception was layman William Hartley, elected President of the Primitive Methodist Conference in 1909.

Nominations are invited each year for president and vice-president. Each is voted upon and designated a year ahead. Each nomination needs to be signed by five ministerial and five lay members of the Representative Session of the Conference. Nominations are collected during the first three days of that Session and displayed for 24 hours before a vote is taken. Voting is by single transferable vote. Voters do not choose one name only but mark all the names in order of preference. In this way if their first choice is not elected, they may influence the voting for an alternative.

The Conference resolves at the beginning of the Representative Session that the president designated the previous year be elected and similarly for the vice-president-designate. Each holds office for one year.

==== Chair of the District ====
A minister who is appointed to take administrative responsibility, along with pastoral responsibility for the ministers, for a district. This is undertaken as if a normal appointment to serve in a circuit, and the term of service is typically some 5 to 10 years.

==== Superintendent and circuit ministers ====
The senior minister on any circuit is the superintendent (sometimes informally shortened to "super"), who may be the only minister, though the current trend for amalgamation of circuits makes this rare. The superintendent will also have pastoral responsibility for at least one of the local churches on the circuit, with pastoral responsibility for others being allocated to the other ministers.

==== Deacons ====
Ministers within the Methodist Diaconal Order (MDO) are referred to as deacons. A warden is appointed by the Conference from among the deacons to exercise oversight over the MDO, and there is now also a deputy warden.

==== Local preachers ====
Local preachers are accredited laypeople who preach and lead worship services in any church on the circuit to which they may be appointed. In Wesleyan Methodism it was not usual practice for local preachers to administer the Lord's Supper (Holy Communion), but in Primitive Methodism (1811 to 1932 in Britain) the local preachers did administer sacraments. Local preachers continue to serve an indispensable role in the Methodist Church, with the majority of church services led by laypeople, but special authorisation is required to preside over Communion.

=== Meetings ===
The "Circuit Meeting" (originally the "Quarterly Meeting") is the main governing body of the circuit, and consists of all ministers living in the circuit, circuit officers, and officers and elected representatives of the various churches in the circuit. The circuit officers are officially responsible for the running of a circuit; they are collectively responsible for finances, though almost invariably one of them will be appointed treasurer. The preachers (local preachers and ministers) also hold a quarterly "(Local) Preachers' Meeting" that governs worship and preaching issues.

The "Church Council" is held twice per year or as required to govern the business of individual churches. Officers of the church council will include a secretary and treasurer.

== Other countries ==
Some Methodist churches in countries outside Britain have retained the circuit system; others have not, or never had it. Where Methodist churches have entered national united churches (such as the Church of South India or the United Church of Canada, the circuit system has generally disappeared or been greatly modified even if it existed before. The US United Methodist Church does not at present operate on a circuit system, though something like it is reappearing in places. The Methodist Church of New Zealand has a circuit system, but refers to its circuits as parishes.

== Case history – the Wetton and Longnor Methodist Circuit ==
The place of the circuit in Methodism can be understood from a specific example, the Wetton and Longnor Methodist Circuit providing an example from rural Methodism.

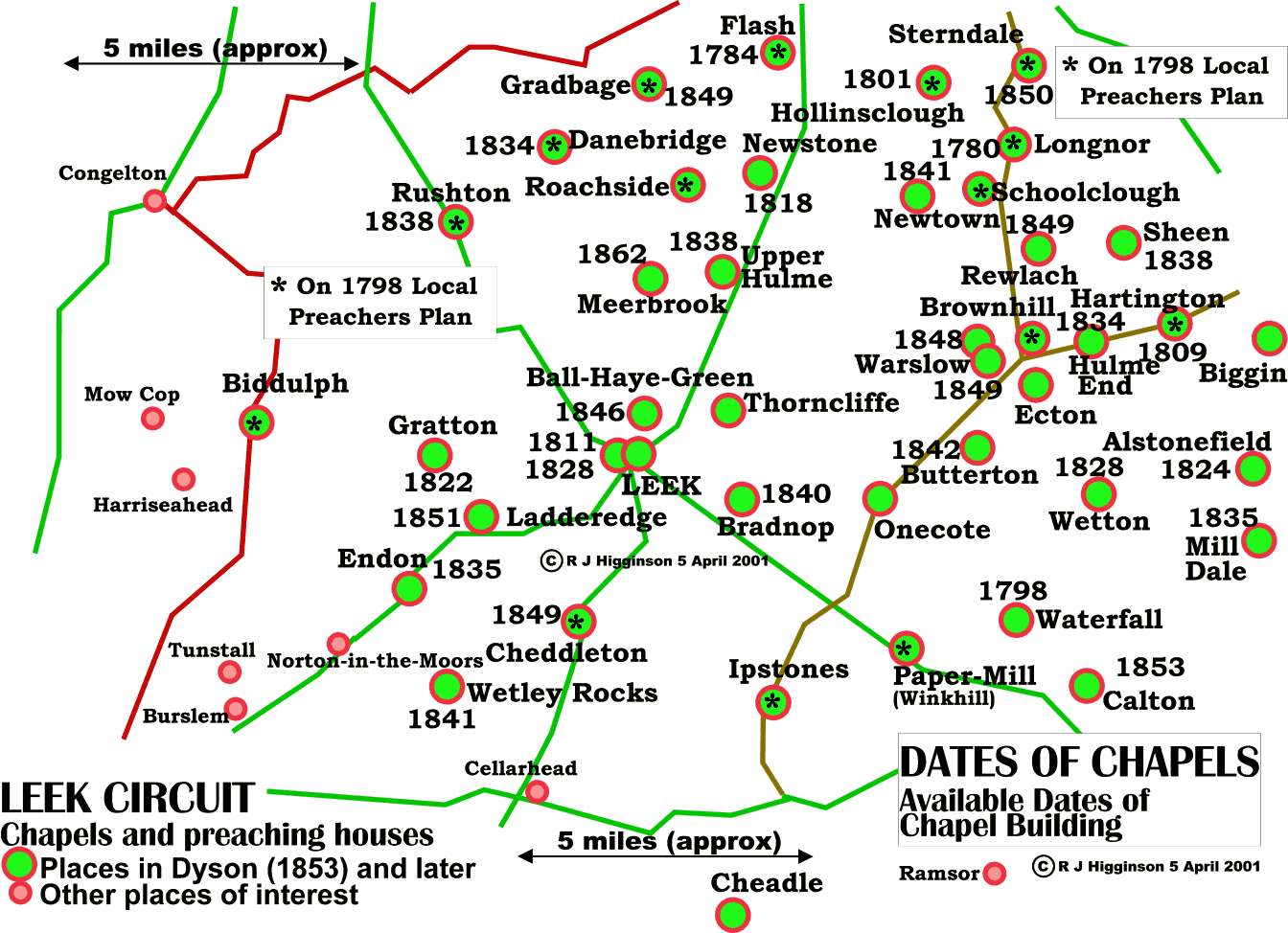
Diagrammatic map of Methodist Chapels around Leek with first known building dates

The diagrammatic map of the Leek area shows the number of "preaching stations" and chapels in existence during the 18th and 19th centuries, both Wesleyan and Primitive. (This is not exhaustive, but shows information at the time of drawing.) Some of the places were cottages or farmhouses, and not the final location of a chapel. The diagram includes a reference to a preaching plan of 1798.

It is easier to describe the origins of the Wetton and Longnor Circuit by reference to the "family tree," which shows the sequence by which the north of England was divided into Circuits of smaller areas as the number of Methodists grew. This had the advantages of both reducing the time spent in traveling, and ensuring that the work load of the Travelling Preachers was manageable.

In 1870, the Wesleyan Leek Circuit was divided to form the Wetton and Longnor Circuit. A new manse was built at Wetton to house the minister. The Methodist Union of 1932 brought new chapels from the Primitive Methodists. In some cases, such as at Warslow, this meant having two buildings in the same road a couple of hundred yards apart. The P.M. building was the more suitable, so the Wesleyan building was eventually sold.

In 1962, for example, there were 10 societies in the Circuit. These were Wetton, Alstonefield, Hartington. Butterton, Warslow, Longnor, Rewlach, Sheen, Newtown, and Hollinsclough. Rewlach, for example, was a chapel in a remote location associated with one farmhouse and little else. Yet even in the 1990s, not long before closure, it still attracted enough people to fill the building for harvest festival. The only chapel still open as a place of worship is Hollinsclough, which celebrated its 200th anniversary at Easter 2001.

Modern population trends, and economic pressures, led to the end of Wetton and Longnor as a separate Circuit. In 1969, it ceased and the various chapels were allocated to neighbouring Circuits of Leek, Ashbourne and Buxton. It is not only Methodist chapels that have closed. Many village schools have also closed during the same time.

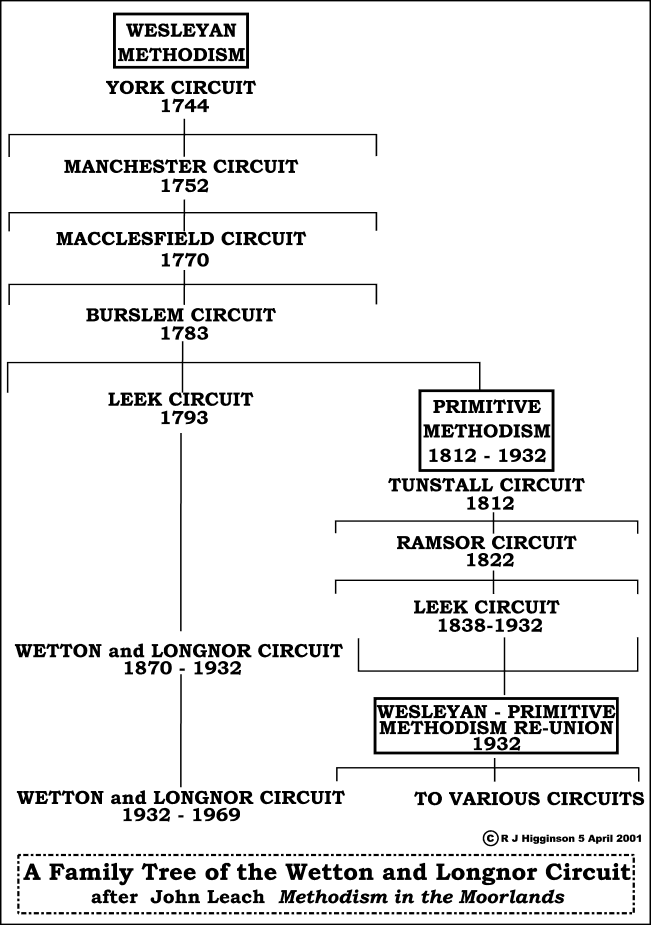

== See also ==
- Penitent band
- Annual Conferences of the United Methodist Church
- Parish, Deanery and Diocese – the organisational units in the Church of England
- Ecclesiastical polity
- List of Methodist churches
