= Lizard and Mount's Bay Methodist Circuit =

Methodist circuit in Cornwall, England

Coordinates: 50°07′58.7″N 5°24′59.0″W

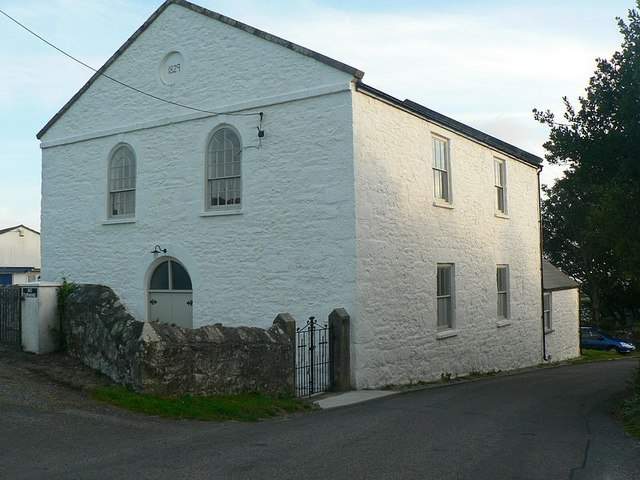
One of the chapels in the Methodist circuit, Balwest Methodist church.

The Lizard and Mounts Bay Methodist Circuit is a Methodist circuit that serves the area surrounding Mount's Bay in Cornwall, England.

The Methodist Circuit includes 18 Methodist churches which are Balwest, Breaney, Central, Cury, Crowlas, Degibna, Goldsithney, Kenneggy, Leedstown, Meneage, Marazion, Mullion, Ponsongath, Porthleven, Ruan Minor, St Keverne, The Lizard, and Trinity. With Breaney being in Breage Central being in Helston, Meneage being near Manaccan and Trinity being in Porkellis. Central Methodist church in Helston changed its name when Trewennack Methodist church closed. The congregations of both Trewennack and Helston joined together to create Central Methodist church. Central Methodist church is the headquarters for the Methodist circuit and is also the largest church in the circuit.

The circuit had 21 churches when it was announced that some Methodist churches would close down, and the circuit thought that this would save money and make the other chapels last longer. The circuit said that the churches that close will not be known until 2017 but Trewennack, Chynhale and Godolphin have closed down and it is thought by many people that the Methodist chapels in the circuit will still be closing down.

Between 2017 and 2020 three additional churches closed: Degibna, Kenneggy and Ponsongath, taking the total to fifteen.
