= Jarvis Hall =

Jarvis Hall may refer to:

- Jarvis Hall (Colorado), a former Episcopalian college in Golden and Denver, Colorado
- Jarvis Hall, Steyning, a former chapel in Steyning, West Sussex, used by four Nonconformist Christian denominations
