= Steyning Methodist Church =

Church in West Sussex, England

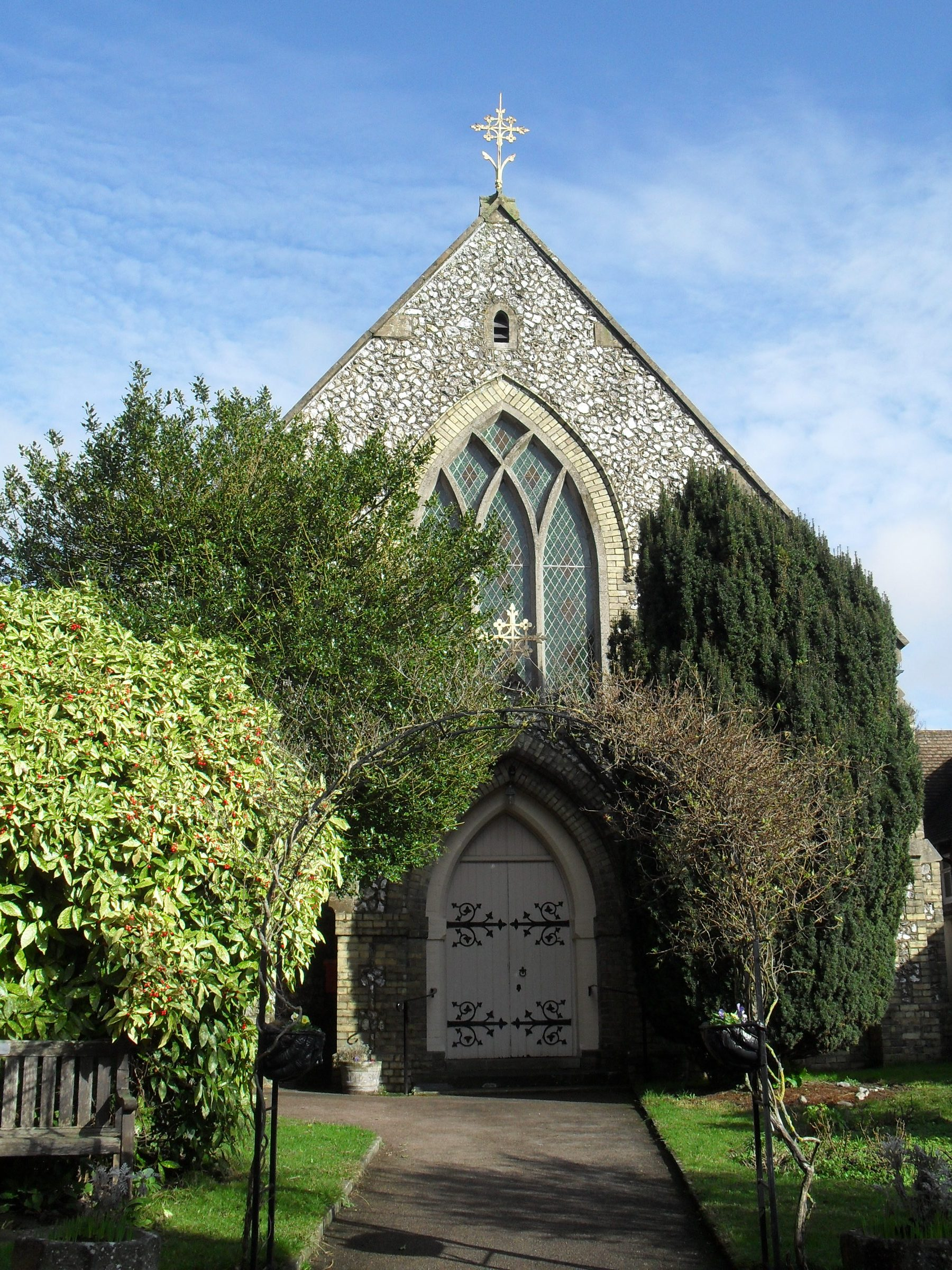
- The church from the west
- Steyning Methodist Church
- 50.8877°N 0.3265°W
- Location: High Street, Steyning, West Sussex BN44 3GG
- Country: England
- Denomination: Methodist Church of Great Britain
- Website: www.steyningmethodists.org.uk/

History
- Status: Church
- Founded: 12 July 1877
- Dedicated: 13 April 1878

Architecture
- Functional status: Active
- Architect: James E. Lund
- Style: Gothic Revival
- Groundbreaking: 1877
- Completed: 1878
- Construction cost: £1,885

Specifications
- Capacity: 300
- Materials: Flint, yellow brick, stone

Administration
- Division: Downs Section

Steyning Methodist Church is a Methodist place of worship serving Steyning and surrounding villages in the Horsham district of West Sussex, England. Built for a Wesleyan Methodist congregation who had outgrown an earlier chapel nearby, the Gothic Revival building opened in 1878 and has since been extended. The flint and yellow brick church is set back from Steyning's ancient High Street and is within the village conservation area. It is one of nine churches in the Worthing Methodist Circuit.

== History ==
Protestant Nonconformism was well established in Sussex by the beginning of the 19th century, and Wesleyan Methodism had a strong presence. In 1807, the Lewes and Brighton Wesleyan Circuit was founded, covering much of the county; it administered ten churches by 1841. In September of that year, Methodists first began to meet in Steyning, an ancient village whose strategic position made it an important centre of trade. St Cuthman founded its church in the 8th century; King Æthelwulf of Wessex was later buried there; and George Fox and William Penn were associated with a 17th-century Quaker meeting house.

In 1843, the infant Methodist community (which had formed in September 1841) acquired a chapel built eight years earlier for the Countess of Huntingdon's Connexion, a local Calvinistic Methodist denomination. They joined the Lewes and Brighton Circuit by March 1844, at which time there were 33 members. The "neat" building was called Trinity Chapel by 1855, and its Sunday school thrived. Consideration was given in 1874 to expanding the premises, but the congregation and trustees decided to move out and build a larger chapel instead. Henry Northcroft, active in the Worthing and Lancing Methodist churches nearby, gave a plot of land behind Steyning High Street in 1875.

James E. Lund, an architect from Worthing, was commissioned to design plans for the new church. He attended and preached at Bedford Row Methodist Chapel in his home town, and was later responsible for designing Worthing Tabernacle and West Worthing Tabernacle (now West Worthing Evangelical Church) in the Romanesque Revival and Queen Anne styles respectively. He planned a Gothic Revival-style chapel capable of holding 300 worshippers and with an adjoining 200-capacity schoolroom. The Steyning-based building firm of Charles B. Oxley won the contract to build it, and the chapel was officially founded on 12 July 1877. Three dignitaries laid the foundation stone: Henry Northcroft, Sir William McArthur mp and Caroline Spong, wife of the minister of Cliftonville Congregational Church in Hove. There were speeches, a celebratory feast at a nearby inn and a public meeting, at which nearly £100 was raised for the church. Work was scheduled to continue until October 1877, but Oxley's firm went bankrupt and construction was suspended for five months until the receivers made arrangements with another builder. The chapel was completed within a month, and it opened for worship on 13 April 1878. The building contract was valued at £1,220.10s.0d, and the total cost including fittings and land was £1,885. The debt at the time of opening was £203.7s.9d; the church trustees had auctioned their former chapel (by now called Jarvis Hall) in May 1878 and received £223.16s.8d., which went towards the building fund.

The church struggled in its early years: the "peculiar difficulties of the Steyning cause", especially its low membership, were debated throughout the 1880s. Proactive work by ministers and the congregation, including outreach efforts to neighbouring villages and invitations to popular preachers, turned its fortunes around, and membership grew to 27 by 1892. One feature of the church was its lack of a full-time minister: it had been administered from Shoreham-by-Sea Methodist Church since 1870, when the congregation still met in the old chapel. In 1912, a resident minister was appointed to serve Steyning and administer the nearby Ashington Methodist Church as well; but within weeks, he was called away to another position outside Sussex, and left almost immediately. At that time, the congregation consisted mostly of local farming families, and contact with other churches in the village was minimal: when the Anglican vicar of St Andrew's Church attended the Methodist chapel's Golden Jubilee celebrations in 1927, it was headline news in the Sussex Daily News. The building served as a canteen for the armed forces during World Wars I and II, and a substantial air-raid shelter was built during the latter.

Structural improvements were carried out in 1907, and in 1925 three extra rooms were built adjoining the schoolroom. These had their own foundation stones. The church was electrically lit from 1952, and major internal refits were carried out in 1968 and 1979. The £21,050 cost of the 1979 refit, which included a larger kitchen and a new meeting room, was partly met by the Joseph Rank Trust.

The church grew in strength in the postwar period. Outreach to the village as a whole and ecumenical activities with other local churches increased, and membership reached 66 in 1962. Services also became popular with pupils from a nearby boarding school. Centenary celebrations included a parade from the church to St Andrew's parish church, which held a special service. Another internal refurbishment was carried out in spring 2001, after which the church was rededicated.

Steyning Methodist Church now shares a minister with another Methodist church at nearby Storrington as part of the Downs Section of the Worthing Methodist Circuit. A third church in the section, Ashington Methodist Church, closed in October 2010. Steyning and Storrington are two of the nine extant churches in the Circuit; the others are in Worthing, Durrington, Goring-by-Sea, Southwick, Shoreham-by-Sea and Lancing.

== Architecture ==
James E. Lund designed Steyning Methodist Church in the Gothic Revival style. The main building materials are flint and pale yellow brick, and there are stone dressings and quoins. The design is in contrast to the plain stuccoed Neoclassical architecture of the congregation's former chapel, the present Jarvis Hall. The lobby, widened in 1968, is reached through an entrance porch. and was originally lined with glass panels with etched Gothic-style lettering reading Enter into His gates with praise. Other original fittings included tapestry carpets, stone tablets with the Ten Commandments, a tall curved rostrum with decorative ironwork and a timber communion rail. A pulpit was mounted centrally on the rostrum, and an organ stood behind. The 1968 refurbishment included replacing the organ with one taken from Whitefield's Tabernacle, Moorfields, removing the rostrum in favour of a flat platform with a side pulpit and a communion table in the centre, and mounting a teak cross on the wall above.

The chapel is set back a long way from Steyning High Street, behind a garden which was laid with lawn and shrubs in 1879. In its assessment of the Steyning village centre conservation area, in which the chapel is situated, The Steyning Society commented that the chapel's environs were "a delightful area with a mixture of buildings on both sides of the road with a pleasing irregularity of building line".

== See also ==
- List of places of worship in Horsham (district)
