= Cell group =

Form of church organization

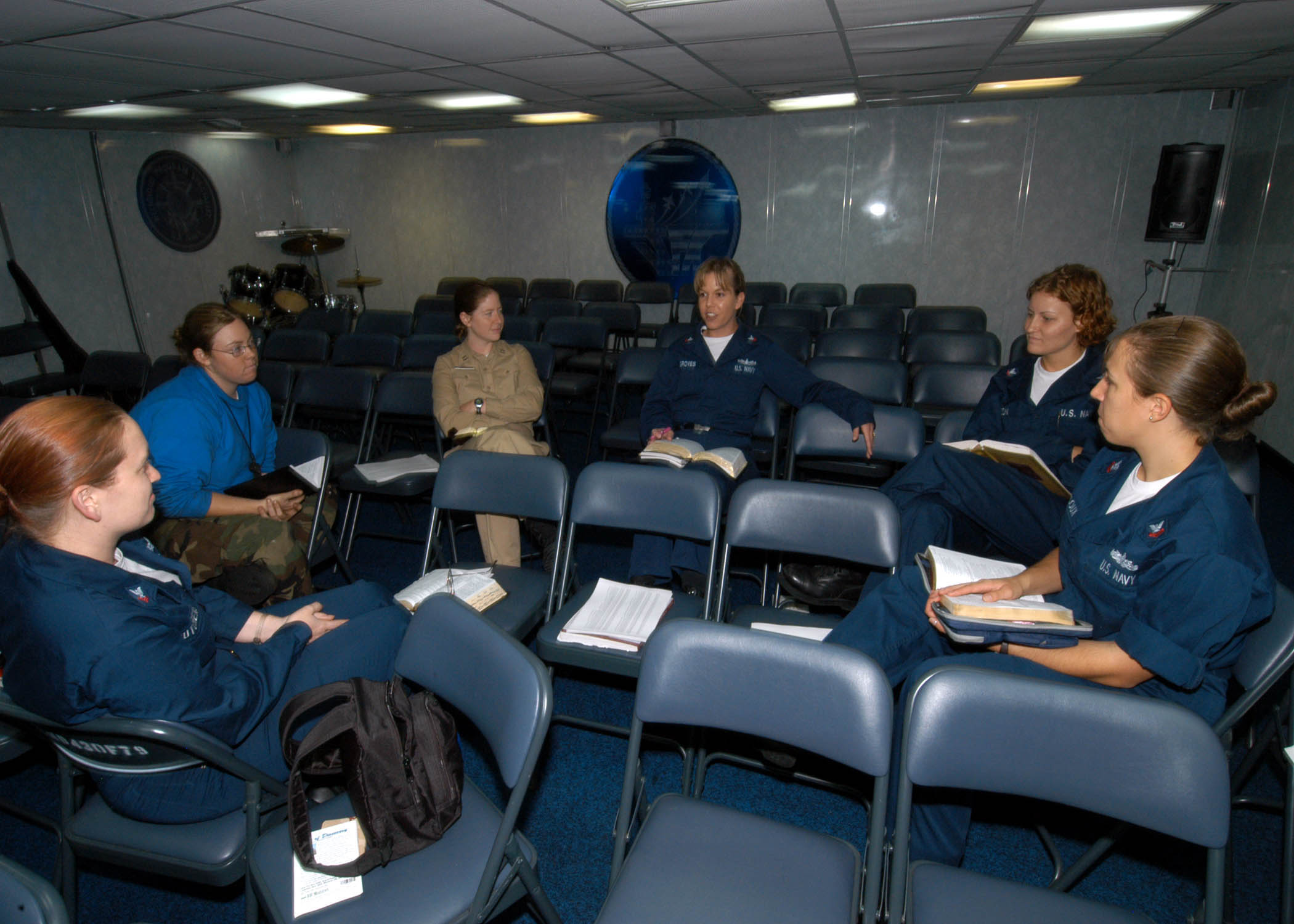
Women's Bible study aboard the USS John F. Kennedy (CV-67)

The cell group is a form of church organization that is used in many Christian churches. Cell groups are generally intended to teach the Bible and personalize Christian fellowship. They are always used in cell churches, but also occur in parachurch organizations and other interdenominational settings, where they are usually referred to as Bible study groups. In Methodism, they are known as class meetings and are a means of grace; in Catholicism, they are known as basic ecclesial communities.

The cell group differs from the house church in that the group is part of an overall church congregation, whereas the house church is a self-contained congregation.

== Terminology ==
The term cell group is derived from biology: the cell is the basic unit of life in a body. In a metaphorical sense, just as a body is made up of many cells that give it life, the cell church is made of cell groups that give it life.

These groups are known by a variety of other names, including life groups, small groups, home groups, classes or class meetings (used historically in Methodism) and fellowship groups.

Colin Marshall uses the term growth group, suggesting that the aim is for group members to "grow in Christ", and, through the group, for the gospel to "grow and bear fruit."

Another term, typically employed in Missional Communities, is huddle. This refers to a small group in which discipleship is emphasized and in which membership is by invitation only.

== History ==
=== Christian Bible ===
David Hunsicker points out that while house churches are mentioned in the New Testament, the institution of a "well-organized, structured church" resulted in the decline of the small home groups.

=== Radical Reformation ===
The concept was resurrected at the time of the Radical Reformation and "Ulrich Zwingli inadvertently pushed the Anabaptists in the direction of small groups when he started meeting with a small gathering of men who were interested in learning New Testament Greek. The concept of small groups was revived again in the late seventeenth century by Anthony Horneck in Great Britain and Philipp Jacob Spener in Germany.

=== Pietistic Lutheranism ===
Philipp Jakob Spener published his Pia Desideria in 1675 and laid out his program for the pietistic revival of the Lutheran Church, emphasising the use of small groups. He suggested the reintroduction of "the ancient and apostolic kind of church meetings", held "in the manner in which Paul describes them in 1 Corinthians 14:26–40." Spener goes on to suggest:

This might conveniently be done by having several ministers (in places where a number of them live in a town) meet together or by having several members of a congregation who have a fair knowledge of God or desire to increase their knowledge meet under the leadership of a minister, take up the Holy Scriptures, read aloud from them, and fraternally discuss each verse in order to discover its simple meaning and what- ever may be useful to the edification of all. Anybody who is not satisfied with his understanding of a matter should be permitted to express his doubts and seek further explanation. On the other hand those (including the ministers) who have made progress should be allowed the freedom to state how they understand each passage. Then all that has been contributed, insofar as it accords with the sense of the Holy Spirit in the Scriptures, should be carefully considered by the rest, especially by the ordained ministers, and applied to the edification of the whole meeting.

=== Methodism ===
Influenced by Pietistic Lutheran conventicles, John Wesley took on the concept of small groups, and has been called the "Father" of the modern small-group concept. Wesley encouraged different kinds of small groups to develop, so that both leaders and members of the Methodist societies could receive support and challenge in their faith. He formed class meetings to "bring small numbers of people together (usually twelve) to pray, read the Bible and listen to exhortations, and to encourage and enjoy each other's company." Specifically, the format of the class meeting is described as follows:

...following an opening prayer and the singing of a hymn, the class leader shared the status of his or her own spiritual standing, thanking God for victory and progress, and then honestly reported any failures, temptations, and struggles. Following the leader's testimony, each person in the group responded to the all-important question, 'How does your soul prosper' or rephrased 'How is your life with God?' and related any failures of the previous week. The honest answers to direct and specific questions were contagious—accounts exist of members who, having lapsed spiritually since the last meeting, were stricken with conviction and sought pardon and restoration during the class meeting. In order to maintain the confidentiality and privacy of the members, visitors were permitted to visit twice before deciding to join a class. If that visitor decided not to become a member of the class, he or she was excluded from any future meeting of the class.

Class meetings, in Methodist theology (inclusive of the holiness movement), are a means of grace for one's sanctification. Louisa Thomas writes, with regard to Methodist class meetings, that:

Class meetings were intentionally limited to a small group; composed of only ten to twelve members, the group met once a week for an hour with the aim of maintaining personal supervision of the group's spiritual growth. Each member frankly and honestly shared his or her victories and struggles with the others. The groups were coeducational in composition and often were a curious mixture of age, social status, and spiritual maturity. Within each class Wesley intended a blending of the seasoned saints with babes in Christ as a means of educating and encouraging the newest converts.

The first class meetings can thus be summarized as a weekly gathering of Methodists who "spoke about their temptations, confessed their faults, shared their concerns, testified to the working of God in their lives and exhorted & prayed for each other." With respect to the practice of confession among Methodists, it is done "To speak each of us in order, freely and plainly, the true state of our souls, with the faults we have committed in thought or deed and the temptations we have felt since our last meeting."

Class meetings continue among certain Methodist connexions today, such as the Lumber River Conference of the Holiness Methodist Church, which holds them on the Lord's Day "for instruction, encouragement, and admonition that shall be a profitable means of grace to our people." Class leaders are examined and appointed by the pastor; in addition to discipling church members in class meetings, the class leader (along with the pastor and board) recommends probationers to membership in the church after a period of six months during which probationers are "taught the doctrines, rules, and regulations" of the Lumber River Conference of the Holiness Methodist Church. Class meetings are held on Friday evenings (the historical fasting day in Methodism) in the African Methodist Episcopal Zion Church, in which the pastor and class leader are to ensure "that all persons on probation be instructed in the Rules and Doctrines of The African Methodist Episcopal Zion Church before they are admitted to Full Membership" and that "probationers are expected to conform to the rules and usages of the Church, and to show evidence of their desire for fellowship in the Church". The Book of Discipline of the African Methodist Episcopal Zion Church states:

¶103. The design of organizing the membership into Classes and the holding of Class Meetings is:
1. To establish a system of sub-pastoral oversight that shall effectively reach every Member of the Church.
2. To establish and keep up meetings for social activities and religious worship, for instruction, encouragement, and admonition, that shall be a profitable means of grace to our people.
3. To aid in carrying out our general financial plan.
4. To aid in carrying out the system adopted from the support the Pastor and the Poor of the Church.
¶104. A Class shall consist of from twelve to twenty persons. As soon as there are thirty persons in any one Class, the Pastor shall make provisions to have it divided into two Classes. A Less number may be divided if necessary.
¶105. Those persons who willfully neglect their class meetings shall be visited by the Leader or Pastor and shall be informed of the consequences of willful neglect. If they do not amend, they shall be excluded from the Church. However, no member in full membership shall be expelled without the due process of a trial and conviction by a Committee.
¶106. Persons who are absent from the class meeting three successive times and do not amend, after they have been duly admonished, shall be brought to trial to answer for such neglect.
¶107. In the arrangement of class meetings two or more classes may meet together, and be conducted according to the plan agreed upon the Pastor and leaders.
¶108. Let care by observed that the Members of the Classes do not fall into formality through the use of a uniform method. Let speaking be voluntary and the services fresh, spiritual, and of permanent religious profit.

Before the Lord's Supper is celebrated on Sunday, the pastor meets with the class leader and class meeting on the preceding Friday to "inquire how their souls are prospering; to exhort, reprove, advise, etc., as duty may require, preparatory to their receiving the Lord's Supper."

Those members of class meetings who are backsliding, often join Methodist penitent bands for counsel.

=== Catholicism ===
In the Catholic Church, small groups that meet to reflect on Scripture are known as basic ecclesial communities. These became popular after the Second Vatican Council.

=== Ecumenical Era ===
Cell groups have become more common in the 20th and 21st centuries. Hunsicker suggests that the concept of cell groups "is becoming prominent in almost every denomination in American Protestantism."

== Structure ==
Cell groups are made of small numbers of Christians, often between 6 and 12, and led by a cell leader. Members may be in the same cell group because of common locality, schools or interests. Cell meetings are usually not conducted in the church sanctuary, if any, but in any of the members' homes, rooms in the church building or other third-party venues.

Cell meetings may consist of a fellowship meal, communion, prayer, worship, sharing or Bible study and discussion.

The use of small Bible study groups is related, but not exclusively associated with, the large churches sometimes called megachurches. In these congregations, small groups perform much of the ministerial work of the church, including teaching the Bible. David Hunsicker suggests that Willow Creek Community Church "has exploded through an effective use of small group strategy."

A number of lesson plans, workbooks, and programs have been developed to facilitate the study of the Bible in small groups. The Alpha Course, originally developed in a Church of England context, but now ecumenical, is one such course intended for use by small groups that provides a synoptic introduction to the entire Bible. The more theologically evangelical Christianity Explored course was devised as an evangelical response to the Alpha Course. Other denominations have similar resources available, such as the Roman Catholic Great Adventure Catholic Bible Study and the United Methodist Church's Disciple series.

== See also ==
- Bible study (Christian)
- Camp meeting
- Penitent band
- Sunday school
