= Jarvis Hall, Steyning =

Jarvis Hall
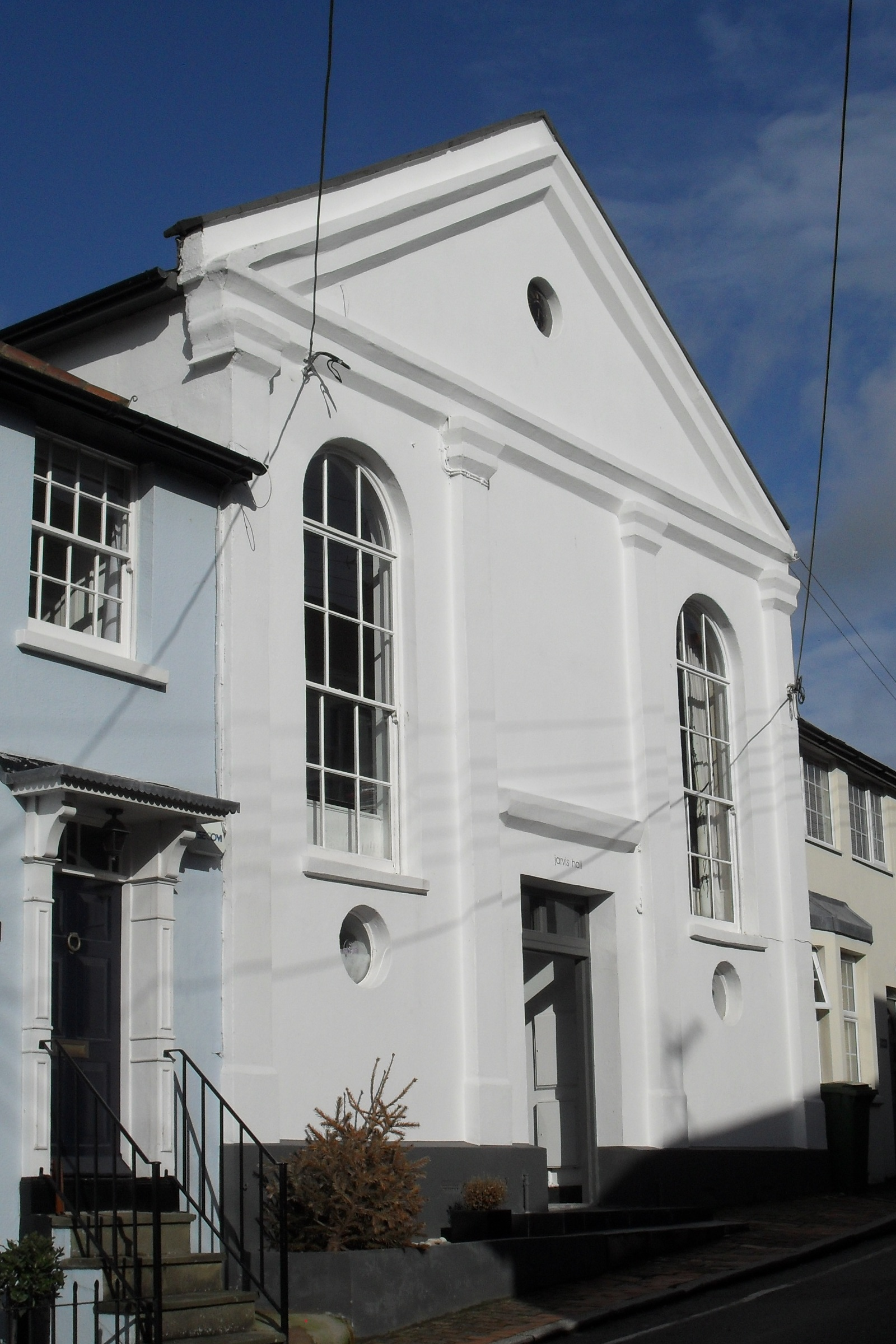
- The former chapel from the south

- Location in West Sussex
- 50°53′14″N 0°19′30″W
- Location: Jarvis Lane, Steyning, West Sussex BN44 3GL
- Country: England
- Denomination: Plymouth Brethren
- Previous denomination: Countess of Huntingdon's Connexion; Wesleyan Methodist; Salvation Army

History
- Former name(s): Trinity Chapel; Rose Villa Chapel
- Status: Chapel
- Founded: 1835 (by Countess of Huntingdon's Connexion)
- Founder: Rev. Edward Lambert
- Events: 1841: Taken over by Wesleyan Methodists; 1878: Vacated; 1883: Taken over by Salvation Army; 1908: Taken over by Plymouth Brethren c. 1987: Closed

Architecture
- Functional status: Residential conversion
- Heritage designation: Grade II
- Designated: 9 May 1980
- Style: Neoclassical
- Completed: 1835
- Closed: c. 1987

Jarvis Hall is a former Nonconformist chapel in the village of Steyning, in the Horsham district of the English county of West Sussex. Since its construction in 1835, the Classical-style building has been used by four different Nonconformist Christian denominations: the Countess of Huntingdon's Connexion, Wesleyan Methodists, the Salvation Army and Plymouth Brethren. The Brethren occupied it last and for the longest time. After about 150 years of religious use, it was sold for residential conversion. English Heritage has listed the former chapel at Grade II for its architectural and historical importance.

== History ==
Steyning was founded early in the Saxon era, and was already an important trading settlement when St Cuthman founded St Andrew's Church in the 8th century. He was later buried there, as was King Æthelwulf of Wessex, increasing the village's significance. Throughout its early history, Steyning was one of Sussex's main settlements, but its importance declined from the 16th century. Residential growth resumed in the 19th century, though.

Sussex was a hotbed of Protestant Nonconformity in the 16th and 17th centuries, and Puritans were active in Steyning from 1587 or earlier. Quaker and Baptist communities became established: a 17th-century timber-framed house now called Penn's House (after William Penn, who lived nearby and was associated with it) was used by Quakers as a meeting house, and a short-lived Baptist chapel existed on Steyning High Street. In 1835, Rev. Edward Lambert, described as a "Dissenting minister" from Brighton, visited Steyning and founded another chapel. It was originally associated with the Countess of Huntingdon's Connexion, a small Calvinistic Methodist denomination found mostly in Sussex, but the cause was unsuccessful. Rev. Lambert returned to Brighton, where he was later associated with Zion Chapel in the town's Bedford Street. Jarvis Lane, on which the originally unnamed chapel stood, was named after its most prominent building—Jarvis House, a 15th-century timber-framed farmhouse. The land around it was part of a tenement called Gervases in 1403, and the name originated with the family of Robert Gervays, recorded in 1255.

Meanwhile, Wesleyan Methodism was growing in strength in Sussex. In 1807, the Lewes and Brighton Wesleyan Circuit was formed; it covered a wide geographic area and controlled ten chapels by 1841. In that year, the Countess of Huntingdon's Connexion congregation stopped meeting at the Jarvis Lane chapel and it was sold to a local butcher. According to deeds and newspaper reports, a Wesleyan congregation was formed in Steyning in about September 1841 and acquired the chapel in 1843. The Methodist trustees paid £350 for the building, and its conveyance was legalised on 13 October 1843. The chapel became part of the Lewes and Brighton Circuit by March 1844.

By 1855, when a local guide noted that "the Wesleyans have a neat chapel at Steyning", the place of worship had a name: Trinity Chapel. Its membership was 33 in 1844, but this declined over the next decades: in 1850 the chapel had 17 members, and there were 10 in 1865. Nevertheless, attendances at services held up—especially in the evenings, when Anglicans from St Andrew's Church are believed to have contributed to the typical figure of 150 worshippers. The chapel's Sunday school was also very successful: 64 children attended in 1876, despite the building's shortcomings (it had a large, tall single space which could not be partitioned). Around this time, the name Rose Villa Chapel also existed.

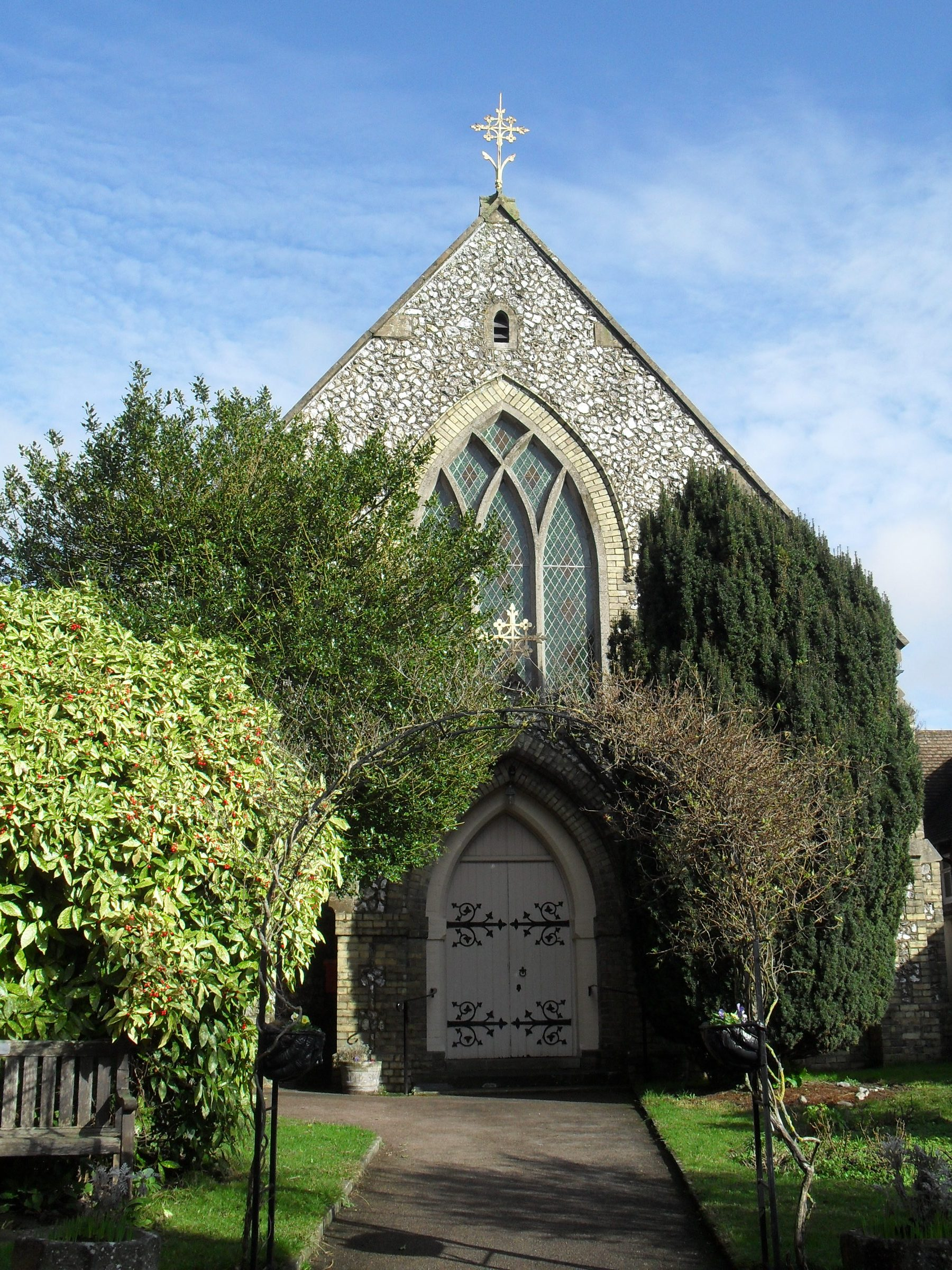
The Methodist community moved into the new Steyning Methodist Church, partly funded by the sale of Jarvis Hall, in 1878.

The trustees debated extending the premises, but in June 1874 it was resolved to take no action. Later that year, Henry Northcroft—a leading figure in Methodism in nearby Lancing (to whose chapel he had given money in 1872) and Worthing—gave some land on Steyning High Street to the Methodist cause. In 1875, the trustees successfully sought permission from the Methodist Conference to sell Jarvis Hall and establish a new larger chapel. At an auction on 27 May 1878, the chapel, its land and all fixtures and fittings were sold to a local builder, William Watson, for £235. After expenses, the trustees had £223.16s.8d. in the building fund for their new chapel, which had begun in the meantime. The new Steyning Methodist Church, in flint and yellow brick, opened on 13 April 1878.

William Watson sold the building on to the firm of Kilner & Burgess, who used it as a mineral water processing and bottling factory. It re-entered religious use in about 1883 when the Salvation Army started meeting there for worship. Meanwhile, from as early as 1875, and certainly by 1884, a congregation of Plymouth Brethren became established in Steyning; they met in a barn on the farmland belonging to Jarvis House. They moved into the chapel in 1907, and it became known as the Christian Meeting Hall. The congregation shared the building with a school gym at first, and a theatre and dance school occupied the building for a time during the 1960s. An independent Christian fellowship also shared the chapel from 1970. Brethren worship continued in the chapel for nearly a century, but in 1987 planning permission was granted to convert the building into flats.

Jarvis Hall was listed at Grade II by English Heritage on 9 May 1980, when it was still a Brethren meeting hall. This status defines it as a "nationally important" building of "special interest". As of February 2001, it was one of 1,628 Grade II listed buildings, and 1,726 listed buildings of all grades, in the district of Horsham.

== Architecture ==
Jarvis Hall is a plain Neoclassical building with a single storey. The walls are stuccoed. The façade has four tall pilasters reaching from ground level to a cornice, above which is a giant pediment with a circular recess which had a clock-face during the chapel's years of Methodist ownership. There are two tall arched windows flanking a double doorway with panelled doors. This has a straight-headed fanlight and sits below a cornice.

== See also ==
- List of places of worship in Horsham (district)
