= Penitent band =

Methodist groupings

In Methodism, part of the Holiness movement, a penitent band is a group of Christians that meets on Saturday night to keep themselves away from temptation and confess their sins. Saturday was the day that the founder of Methodism, John Wesley, had penitent bands meet because that was the day of "the night of greatest temptation for many" as bars experienced much traffic. Penitent band meetings "were very formal, and the hymns, prayers, and teachings were designed to apply to the types of problems the members were experiencing." Members of penitent bands often included those who continually backslid from the expectations of their class meetings. As such, four questions are asked during services of the Methodist penitent bands:

What known sins have you committed since the last meeting?

What temptations have you met with? How were you delivered?

What have you thought, said, or done which may or may not be sin?

== See also ==
- Class meeting
- Lovefeast
