= East Finchley Methodist Church =

Church in London, England

Coordinates: 51.59319°N 0.1677°W

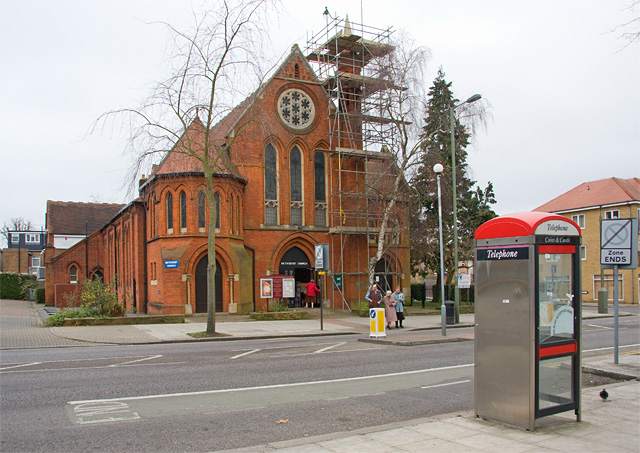
East Finchley Methodist Church

East Finchley Methodist Church is a Methodist church at 197 High Road, Finchley, London. It is part of the Barnet and Queensbury Circuit.

== See also ==
- Finchley Methodist Church
