= Balwest =

Hamlet in Cornwall, England

Coordinates: 50.12082°N 5.36551°W

Balwest: Cornish: Bal West
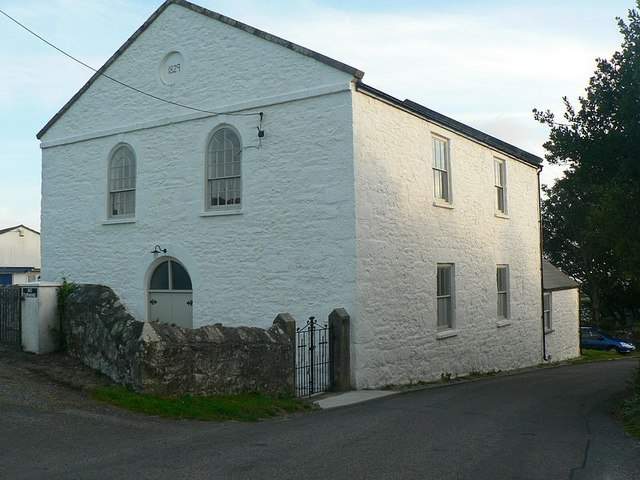
- Balwest Methodist chapel, a Grade II listed building

- Location within Cornwall
- OS grid reference: SW594298
- Shire county: Cornwall
- Region: South West
- Country: England
- Sovereign state: United Kingdom
- Post town: Helston
- Postcode district: TR13
- Police: Devon and Cornwall
- Fire: Cornwall
- Ambulance: South Western
- UK Parliament: St Ives (UK Parliament constituency)

Balwest (Cornish: Bal West, meaning Western Mine) is a hamlet in the civil parish of Germoe in west Cornwall in the United Kingdom.

The hamlet is on the southern edge of a former mining area, part of a geological formation known as the Tregonning-Godolphin Granite (one of five granite batholiths in Cornwall) which was formerly an important source of tin and copper ore (see also Geology of Cornwall).

A Wesleyan Methodist chapel was opened at Balwest in 1829 for miners. The building is Grade II listed.
