= Finchley Methodist Church =

Methodist church in London, England

Coordinates: 51.6072°N 0.1855°W

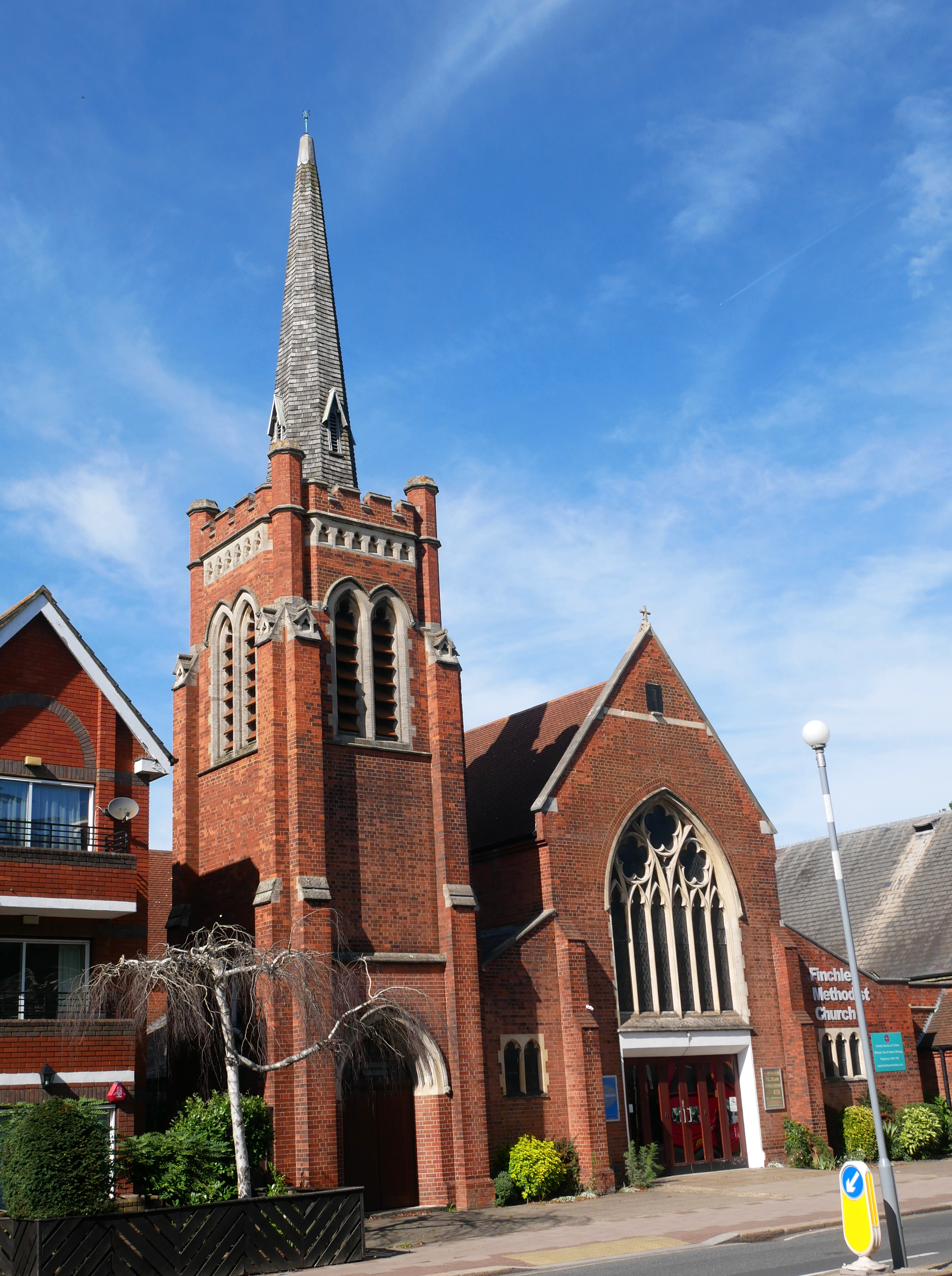
Finchley Methodist Church

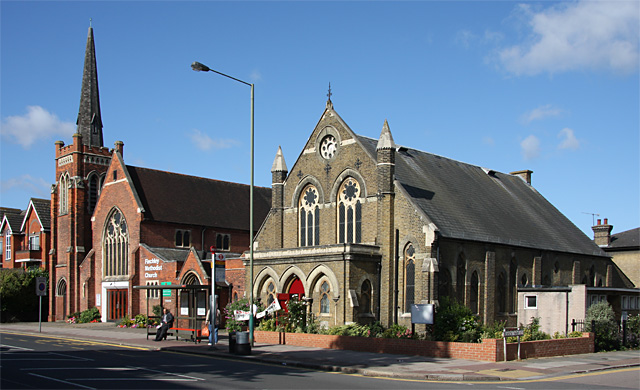
The Wesleyan Hall alongside

Finchley Methodist Church is a Methodist church in Ballards Lane, North Finchley, London.

== See also ==
- East Finchley Methodist Church
