= Trousers as women's clothing =

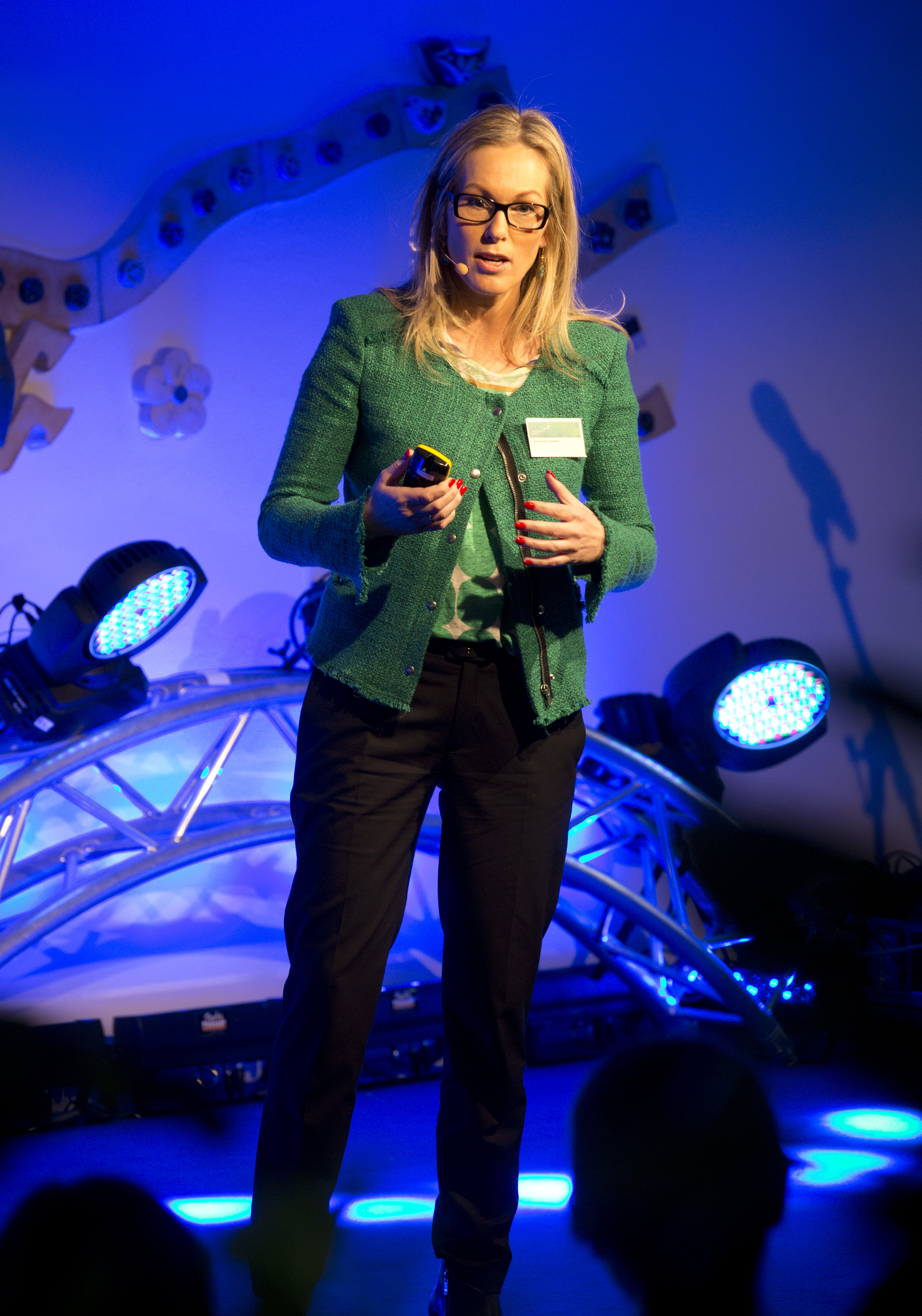
Anita Krohn Traaseth in trousers, Norway, 2013

Trousers (or pants in American English) are a staple of historical and modern fashion. Throughout history, the role of trousers for women has been in constant change. The first appearance of trousers in recorded history was among steppe-people in Western Europe, who were nomads of various different ethnic groups living in the Eurasian grasslands. Archaeological evidence suggests that men and women alike wore trousers in that cultural context.

However, for much of modern history, the use of trousers was restricted to men. This norm was enforced in many regions via social customs and laws. There are, however, many historical cases of women wearing trousers in defiance of these norms, such as the 1850s women's rights movement. Motivations for women wearing trousers against societal norms included comfort, freedom of movement, fashion, disguise (notably for runaway slaves), attempts to evade the gender pay gap, and attempts to establish an empowered public identity for women. Especially in the 20th and 21st centuries, the customs and laws restricting this manner of dress relaxed dramatically, reflecting a growing acceptance and normalisation of the practice.

The teaching of Orthodox Jews and some Christian denominations, such as Conservative Anabaptists and the Methodists of the conservative holiness movement, continue to enjoin women to wear full-length dresses, rather than trousers, in order to maintain what they see as a distinction in the sexes.

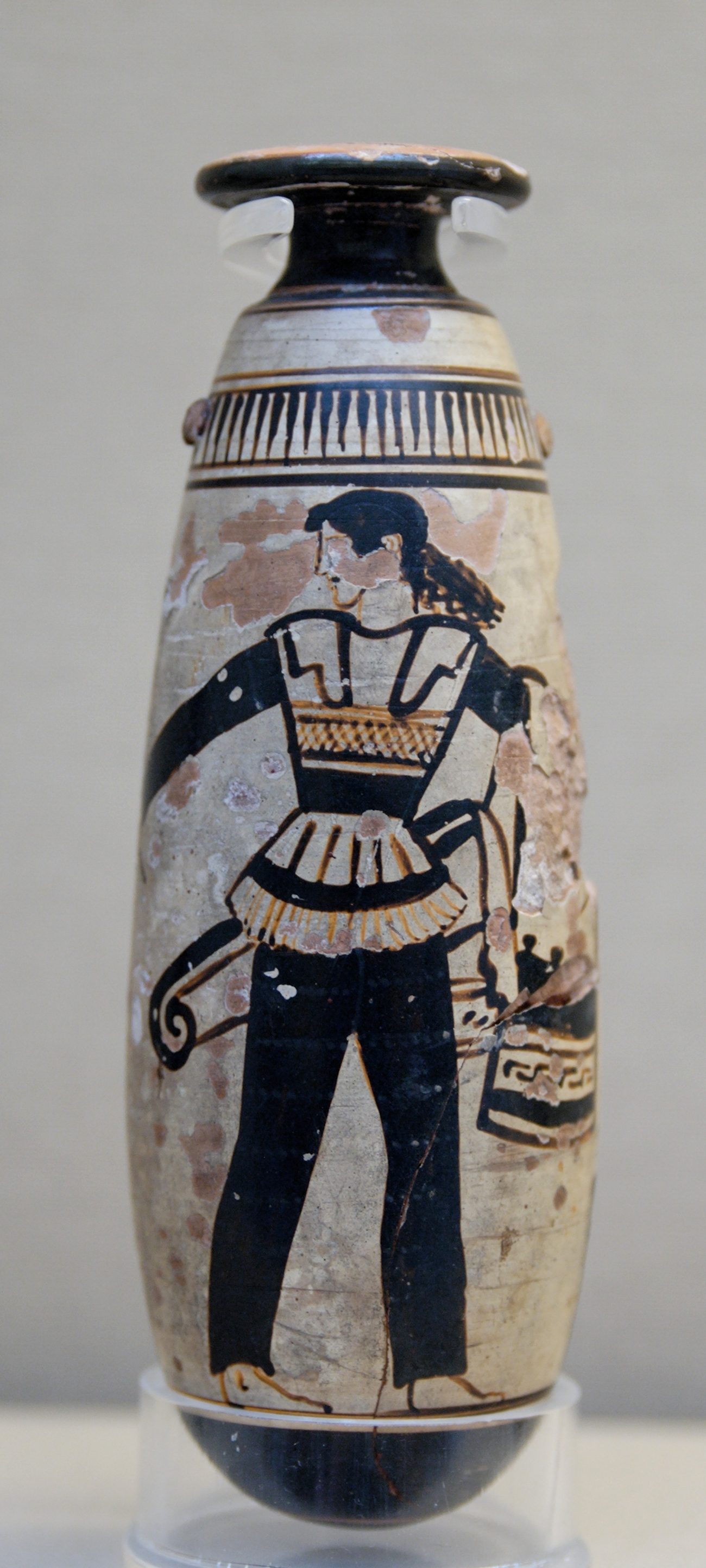
Amazon wearing trousers and carrying a shield with an attached patterned cloth and a quiver. Ancient Greek Attic white-ground alabastron, ca. 470 BCE, British Museum, London.

== Antiquity ==
Although some images from Mycenaean Greece (c. 1750 – c. 1050 BCE) suggest both women and men wore primitive trousers, in classical ancient Greece and ancient Rome, trousers were rarely worn in general. Instead, both sexes wore a tunic as undergarment, with Roman women wearing a stola and men a toga as upper garment. Amongst the Germanic peoples, men generally wore long trousers, and women sometimes as well. It seems that ancient Egyptians and Mesopotamians wore no trousers but a vast array of aprons, robes, cloaks, and knee skirts. On the other hand, all Persians wore tight trousers, regardless of sex; at a later stage, they adopted some cloaks from the Assyrians. Other ancient Iranian peoples such as Scythians, Sarmatians, Sogdians and Bactrians among others, along with Armenians and Eastern and Central Asian peoples such as the Xiongnu/Hunnu, are known to have worn trousers. Trousers are believed to have been worn by both sexes among these early users.

== Western dress reform and laws in the 19th century ==
=== France in the 19th century ===
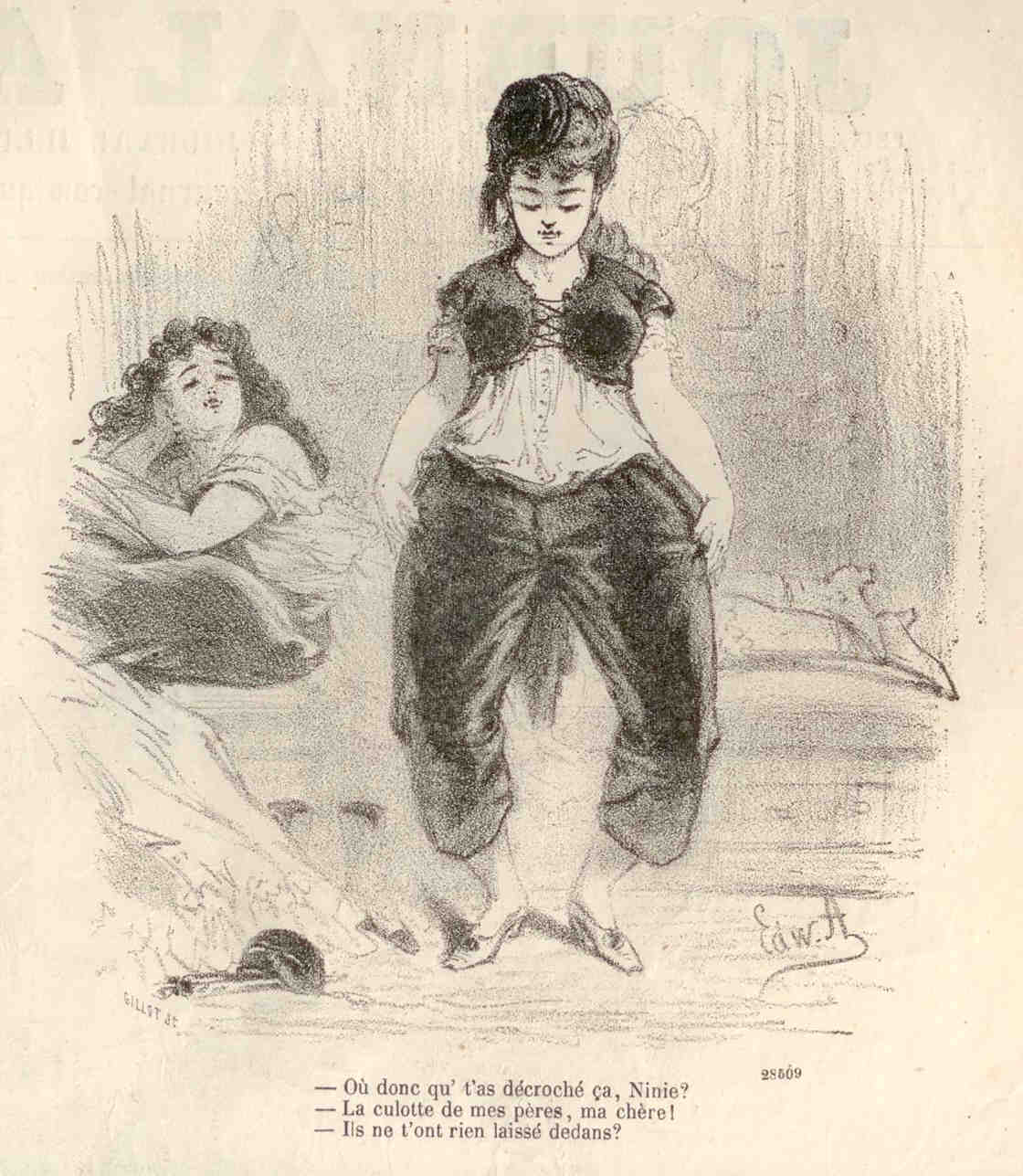
Journal Amusant, number 737, 12 February 1870

From 1800 until 2013, women in Paris, France were technically forbidden from wearing trousers without permission from police, with only a few exceptions. Enforcement of this largely stopped only during World War I and after. In the 1850s, painter Rosa Bonheur had to ask permission from the police to wear trousers, as this was her preferred attire to go to the sheep and cattle markets to study the animals she painted.

=== Laws against cross-dressing and vagrancy in the United States ===
Various U.S. cities, in the 19th and 20th centuries, passed legislation barring women from wearing trousers. Among these U.S. cities include a 1863 law passed by San Francisco's Board of Supervisors criminalising appearing in public in "a dress not belonging to his or her sex", although similar laws existed in Columbus, Ohio (passed 1848); Chicago, Illinois (passed 1851); Houston, Texas (passed 1864); Orlando, Florida (passed 1907), and approximately two dozen other US cities. Anti-cross-dressing laws continued to pass well into the 20th century, with Detroit, Michigan, and Miami, Florida, passing laws into the late 1950s.

Additionally, existing laws such as anti-vagrancy statutes were pressed into service to ensure that women would dress in accord with the gender norms of the time. One such instance would be New York's anti-vagrancy statute of 1845, which stated that "Every person who, having his face painted, discoloured, covered or concealed, or being otherwise disguised, in a manner calculated to prevent him from being identified, shall appear in any road or public highway, or in any field, lot, wood or inclosure, may be pursued and arrested". This law was used to prosecute women for cross-dressing, on the grounds that their dressing outside of gender norms constituted a "disguise". Boston used similar anti-vagrancy laws to arrest Emma Snodgrass and her friend Harriet French in 1852. (Snodgrass would be arrested again in Cleveland in 1853, and French would be arrested again in New York in 1856.) French reportedly broke with convention in order to pursue job opportunities open only to men: she claimed to the New York Daily Times that she could "get more wages" dressed as a man.

Anti-vagrancy laws were also used to arrest Jennie Westbrook in New York, in 1882 and 1883. Westbrook's case was said at the time to have "awakened deep interest" among the public, as it was understood that she was attempting to "escape from that bondage [to] which social laws have subjected the sex". Like Harriet French in Boston, Westbrook identified work opportunities as her reason for cross-dressing: "Her excuse was that she could make $20 a week in her disguise, while as a 'saleslady' in a fashionable store the pay would be only one-third that amount."

=== 19th-century dress reform in the United States ===
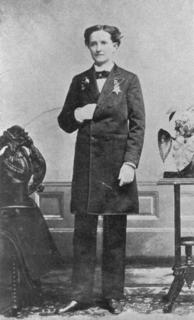
Mary Edwards Walker, c. 1870. Walker was arrested several times for dressing in male attire.

In 1851, early women's rights advocate Elizabeth Smith Miller introduced Amelia Bloomer to a garment initially known as the "Turkish dress", which featured a knee-length skirt over Turkish-style pantaloons. Bloomer came to advocate and promote the dress, including instructions for making it, in The Lily, a newspaper dedicated to the "Emancipation of Woman from Intemperance, Injustice, Prejudice, and Bigotry". This inspired a craze for the dress, which came to be known as bloomers.

Elizabeth Cady Stanton, Susan B. Anthony, and Lucy Stone, other early advocates for women's rights, also adopted this style of dress in the 1850s, referring to it as the "freedom dress".

Concurrently, some female labourers, notably the pit brow women working at coal pits in the Wigan area, began wearing trousers beneath a short skirt as a practical component of their uniform. This attracted the attention of the public, and various photographers produced records of the women's unconventional manner of dress through the mid- to late 19th century.

Another woman who advocated publicly for dress reform was Mary Edwards Walker, the abolitionist and Civil War surgeon. Walker, who had worn bloomers while working at a military hospital, wrote in 1871 that women's dress should "protect the person, and allow freedom of motion and circulation, and not make the wearer a slave to it". Walker openly wore men's trousers, and was arrested several times for wearing male attire. Her earliest arrest was 1866, in New York, and her final arrest was in 1913, in Chicago, at the age of 80 years. Marie Suize Pantalon, a French gold miner and businesswoman in early California, was arrested and tried three times for wearing pants before she petitioned the government for permission to wear them.

== United States and Europe in the 20th century ==
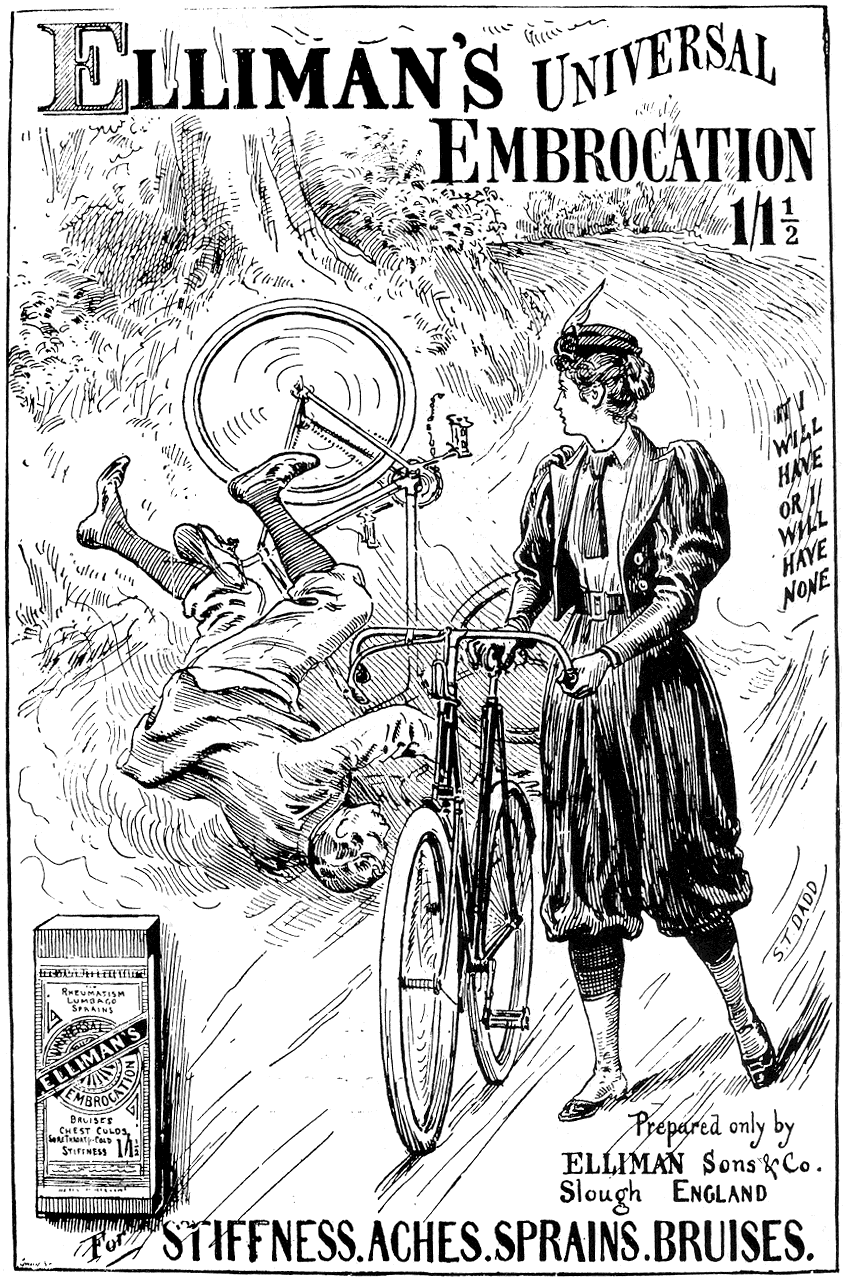
1897: British advertisement showing women's cycling bloomers

=== 1890s–1914 ===
According to Valerie Steele, by the end of the 19th century, Parisian women were wearing bloomers more commonly than English and American women, probably because bloomers were presented as a fashionable item in France rather than a quasi-feminist statement, which fashion writers strongly disliked. By 1895, however, many middle-class American girls had adopted the bike and the bloomer and began to call themselves "New Women," despite society's resistance. Meanwhile, these early women's trousers diversified according to their uses for gymnastics, bathing, cycling or titillation.

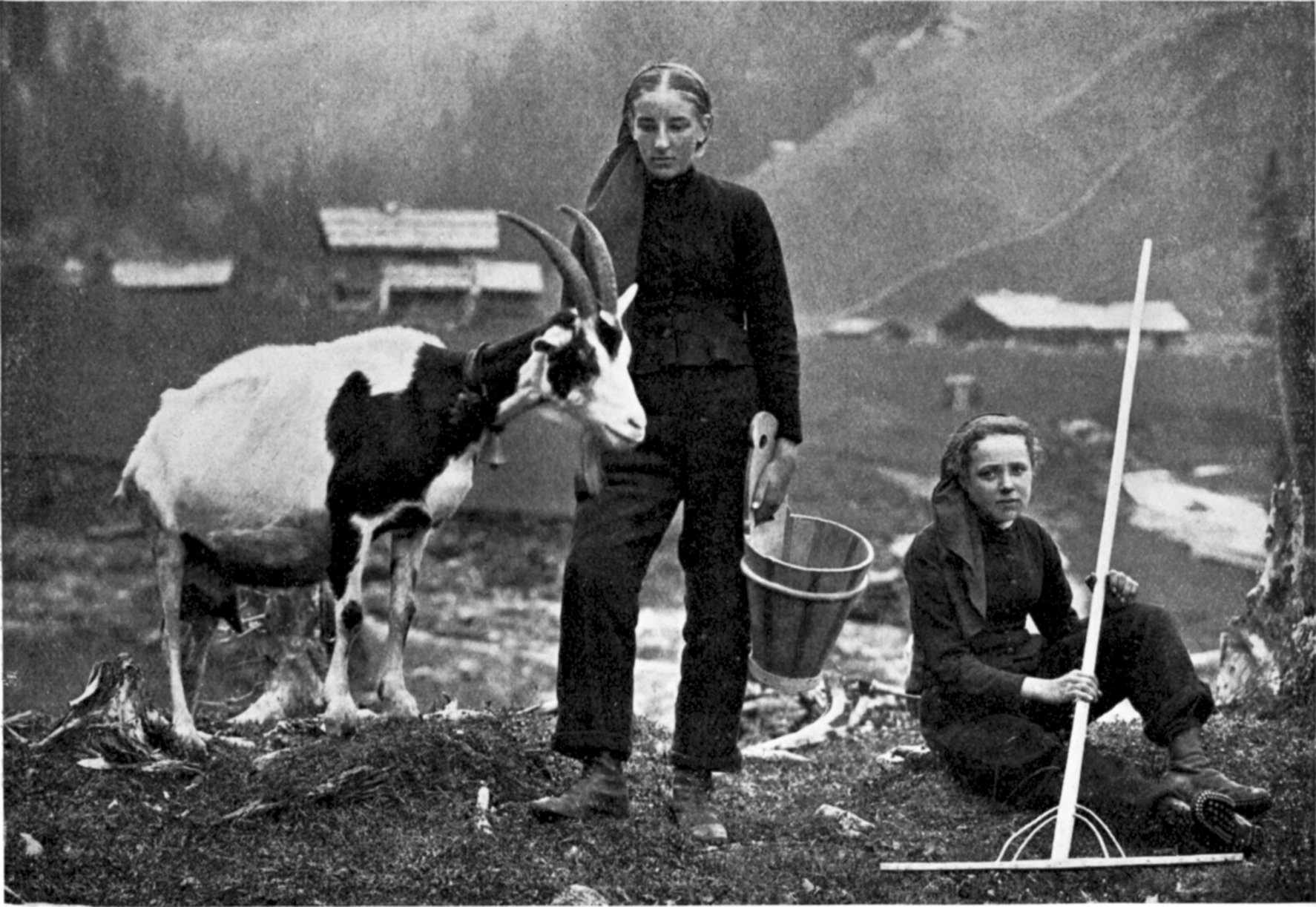
Women in Champéry, Canton of Valais, Switzerland in 1912

An updated version of the bloomer, for athletic use, was introduced in the 1890s as women's bicycling came into fashion. As activities such as tennis, cycling, and horseback riding became more popular at the turn of the century, women turned to trousers or knickerbockers to provide comfort and freedom of movement in these activities, and some laws made allowances for women's wearing of trousers during these activities.

Jeanne Margaine-Lacroix presented wide-legged trousers for women in 1910, some months before Paul Poiret, who took credit for being the first to introduce the style.

=== 1914–1920 ===
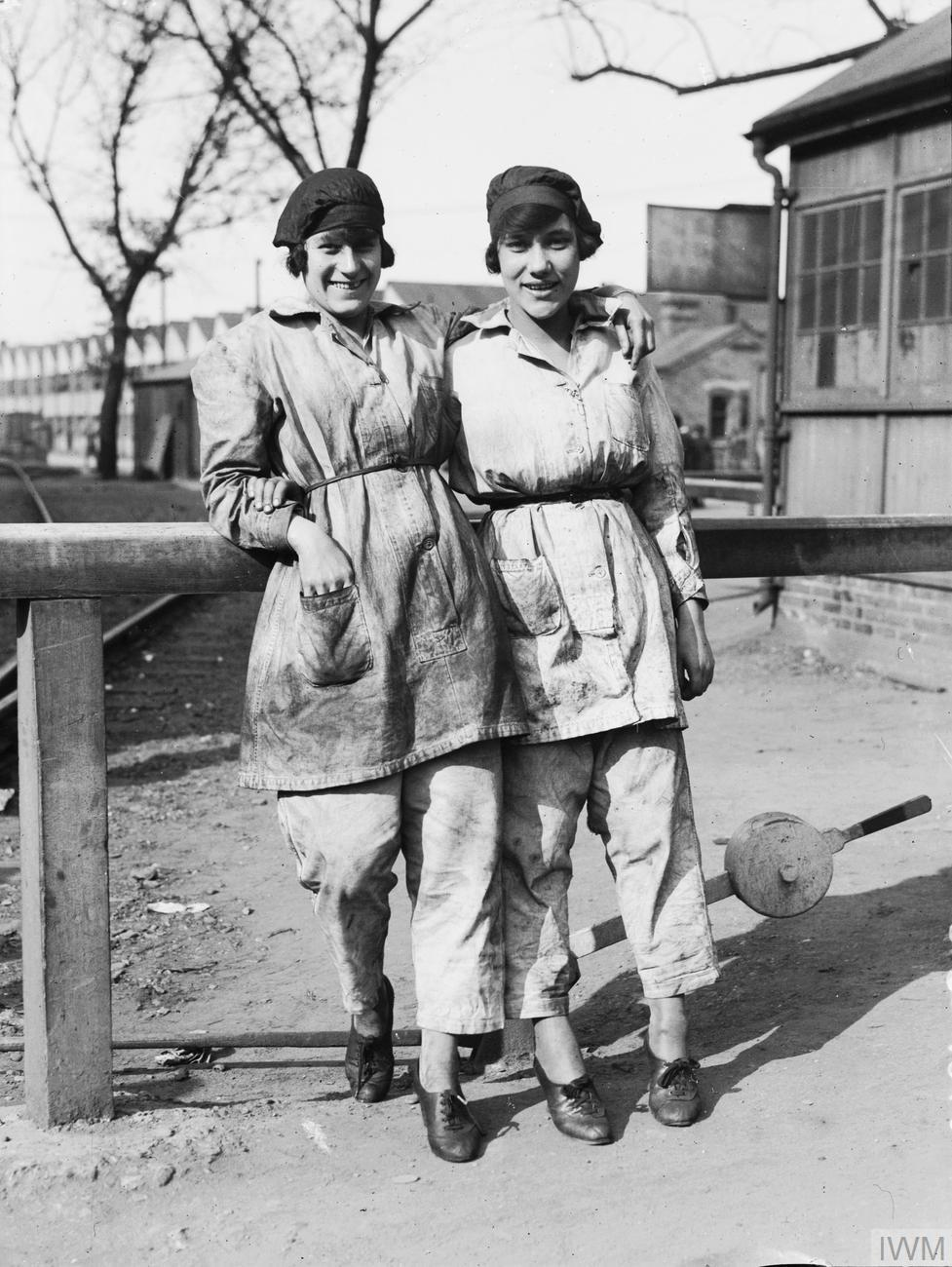
Women workers in 1918 wearing trousers, United Kingdom

During the First World War (1914–1918), many women in countries such as France, the United Kingdom and the United States were recruited to work in factories, especially munitions factories, to aid the war effort, or to replace men in service sectors such as public transport. While many men were sent to the front line to fight, their wives often started to wear their trousers or boiler suits inside the factories for better safety and comfort. Over time, specific designs tailored to the practical needs of female industrial workers were developed by other women. Although it was considered daring as they challenged dress norms in doing so, necessitated by the circumstances, women's trousers gained some social acceptability during the war years.

However, arrests for women wearing trousers did not cease. For instance, in 1919, labour leader Luisa Capetillo became the first woman in Puerto Rico to wear trousers in public. Capetillo was sent to jail for what was then considered to be a crime in Puerto Rico, although the judge later dropped the charges against her. She would repeat this act of rebellion again stepping off the boat into Cuba where the judge was not so lenient leading to her serving time.

=== 1920s ===
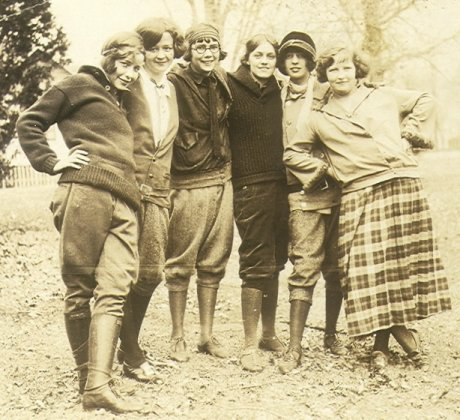
Women wearing knickerbockers 1924

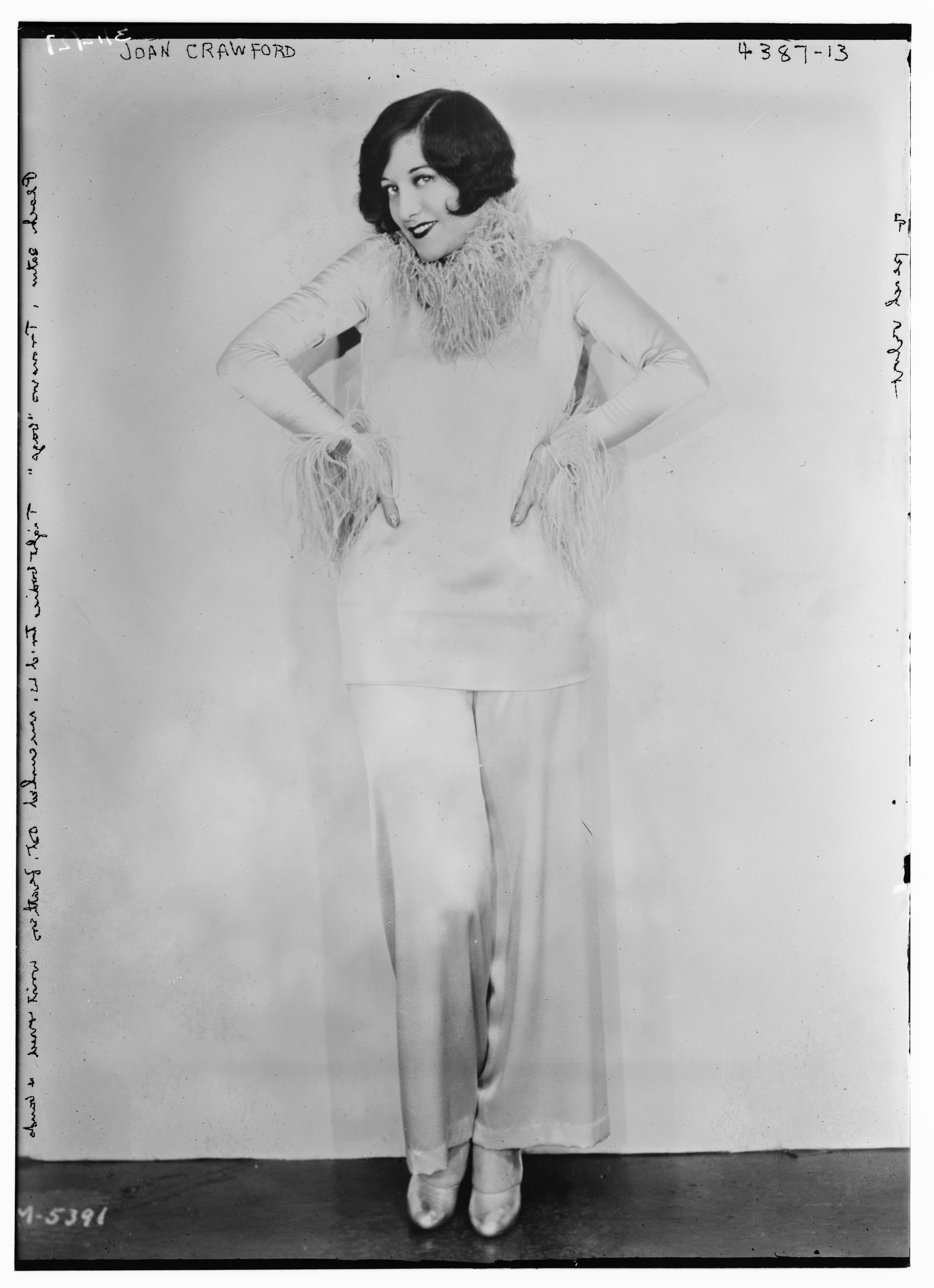
Actress Joan Crawford wearing trousers in 1927

During the post-war years into the early 1920s, French and American clothing manufacturers appear to have been confused on what kind of clothes to make for women, as some thought prewar norms should be restored, whilst others sought ways forward and evolution. With economies still in tatters and certain fabrics in short supply, this forced designers to be creative, with most initially focusing on new types and designs of skirts and dresses. Meanwhile, however, after gaining more socioeconomic independence by doing paid work in the absence of their husbands, women in many countries successfully campaigned for the right to vote, obtaining more political power and social autonomy. Athleticism and sports were increasingly accepted as activities for women, wearing more convenient trousers which were decreasingly called 'bloomers', and no longer explicitly associated with feminist activism.

Women increasingly wore trousers as leisurewear in the 1920s and 30s, and working women, including female pilots, often wore trousers.

=== 1930s ===
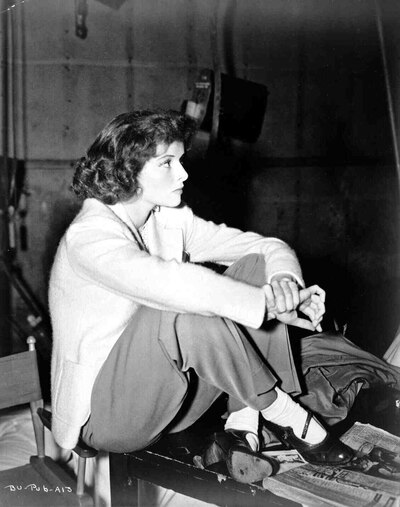
Katharine Hepburn in a publicity still from Bringing Up Baby in 1938

Actresses Marlene Dietrich and Katharine Hepburn were often photographed in trousers in the 1930s, showing how the style had spread from the working class and Dietrich famously appearing in a black tuxedo and matching fedora at the 1932 premiere of The Sign of the Cross.

Eleanor Roosevelt became the first First Lady to appear in trousers at a formal function, presiding over the Easter Egg Roll in 1933 wearing riding trousers, a consequence of not having time to change after an early morning ride. However, she seemed to embrace the unconventional circumstance, posing for a photo in the trousers on the South Portico of the White House.

American women fencers were originally required to wear skirts when competing. In 1937, the Amateur Fencers League of America issued a new rule book stating, among other things, that after September 1, 1939, women would be allowed to wear either a "divided skirt" or "loose-fitting white trousers fastened below the knee".

In 1938, Helen Hulick was jailed for contempt after refusing a Los Angeles judge’s order to wear a dress while testifying in court. The case attracted substantial public attention. An appellate court overturned the contempt citation.

Vogue featured its first spread of women wearing slacks in 1939.

=== 1939–1945 ===
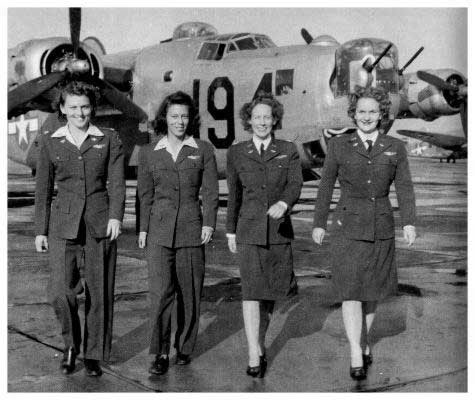
WASP pilots: (left to right) Eloise Huffines Bailey, Millie Davidson Dalrymple, Elizabeth McKethan Magid, Clara Jo Marsh Stember, c. 1943. Two of the women are wearing trousers.

During World War II (1939–1945), history repeated itself on a larger scale, with more women than in World War I cutting their hair and donning trousers to work in factories more safely while men were sent to the battlefields. In 1942–1945, more American women entered the workforce than ever before. Unlike previous decades, American manufacturers did not look to Parisian couture designs for inspiration, but developed their own clothing styles, within the limits set by war-time necessity. Only cotton, wool blends, or synthetics such as rayon were available; fabrics reserved purely for military used included pure wool (uniforms, military coats, and blankets) and silk and nylon (primarily for parachutes). There was little colour and ornamentation, since these were regarded as inappropriately ostentatious and unpatriotic in war time, when conservation and self-discipline were critical. Women working in industrial work in war service wore their husbands' trousers.

Similarly, in Britain, because of the rationing of clothing, many women took to wearing their husbands' civilian clothes to work while their husbands were away in the armed forces. This was partly because they were seen as work garments, and partly to allow women to keep their clothing allowance for other uses. As the men's clothes wore out, replacements were needed, so that by the summer of 1944 it was reported that sales of women's trousers were five times more than in the previous year.

=== 1946–1959 ===
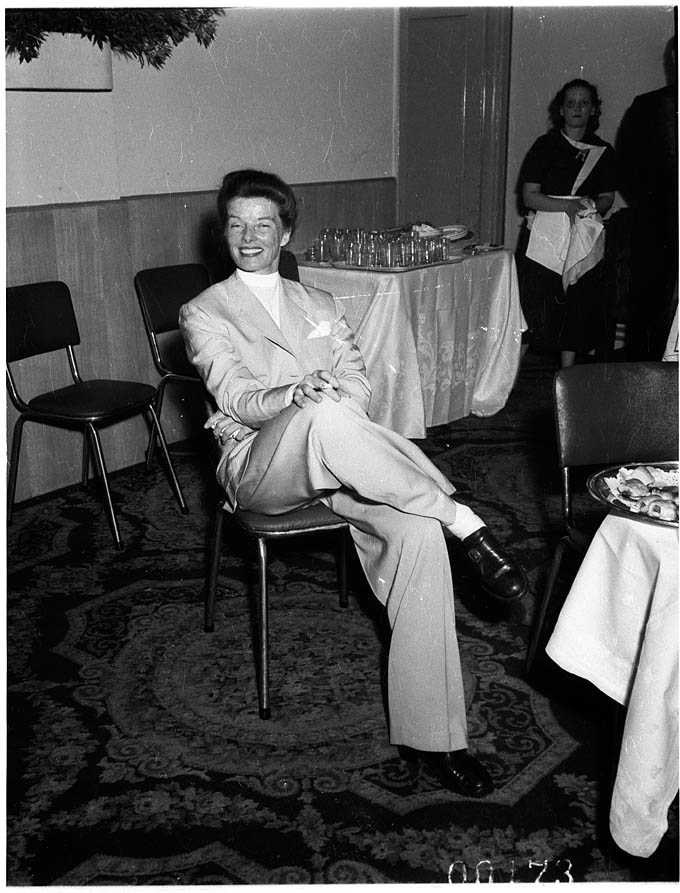
American actress Katharine Hepburn wearing wide trousers (1955)

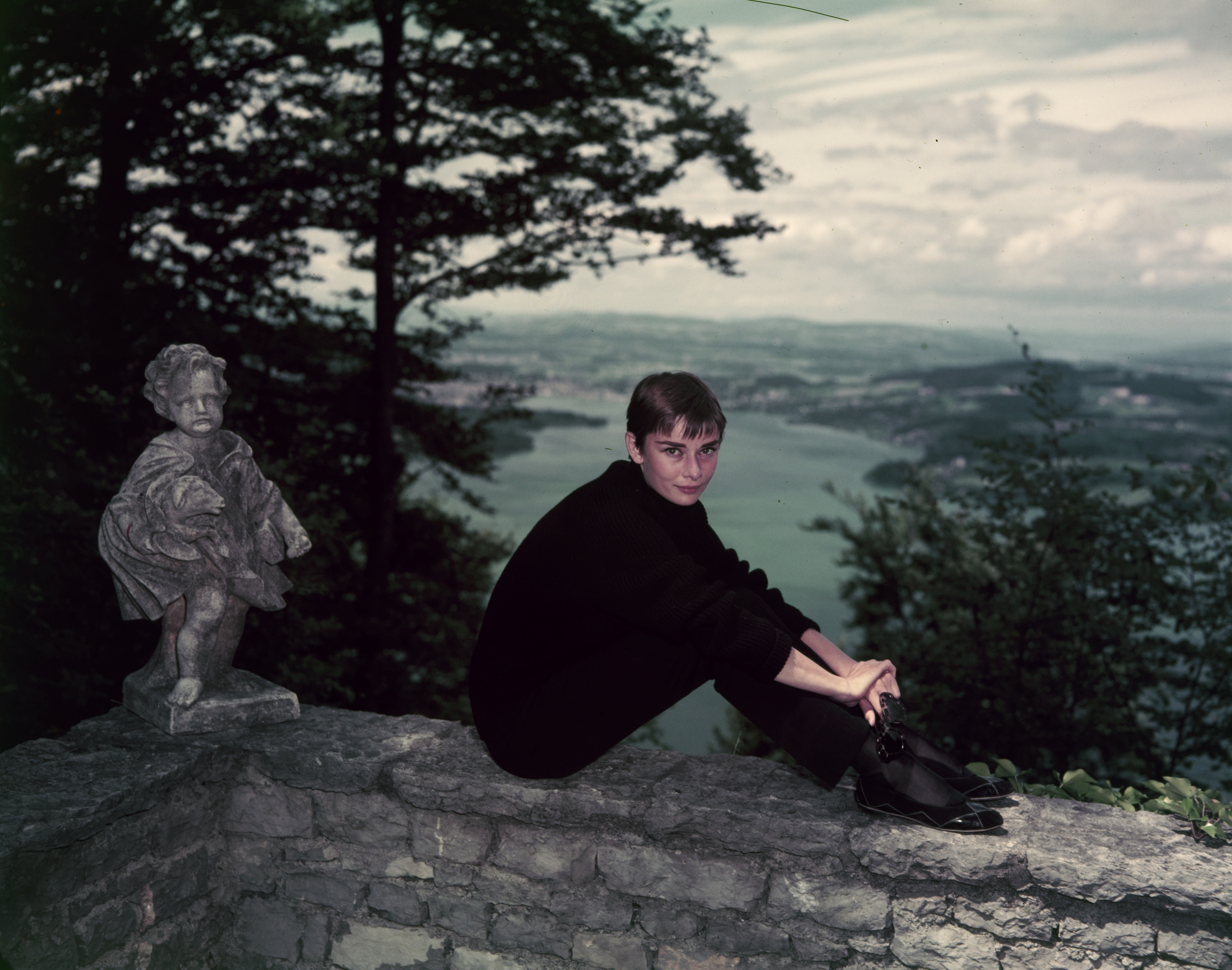
British actress Audrey Hepburn wearing slim black trousers, black turtleneck, and ballet flats, as well as short hair (1956)

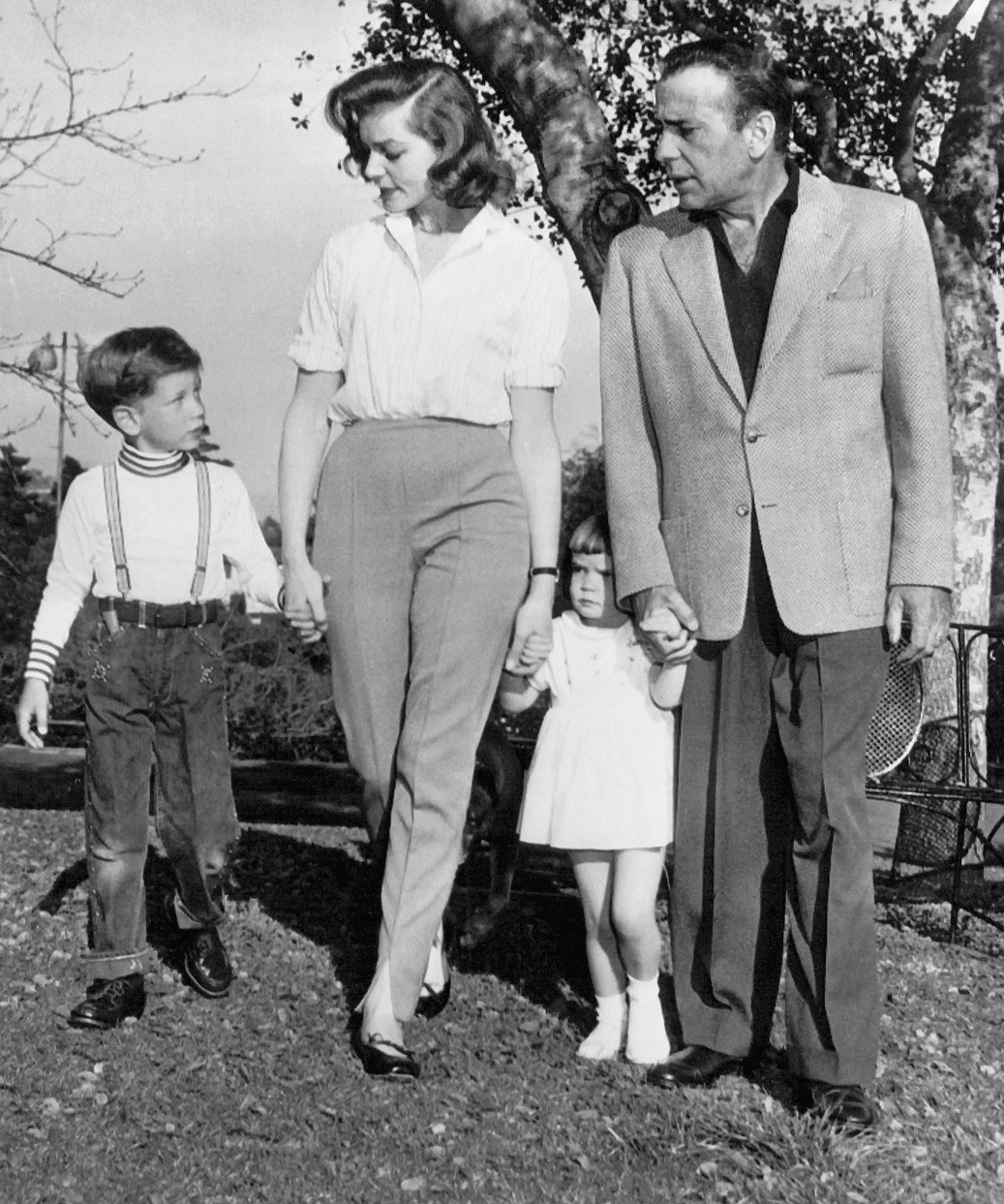
American actress Lauren Bacall with her family, wearing trousers (1956)

Unlike the Interwar Period, women's trousers made a lasting breakthrough after World War II, both as a piece of clothing for everyday use and as a fashion statement. In the post-war era trousers or slacks were still common casual wear for gardening, socialising, and other leisure pursuits; apart from leisure, however, only actresses such as Marlene Dietrich, Katharine Hepburn and Audrey Hepburn or other fashionable women such as Coco Chanel wore them in public for everyday use. In general, most women had reverted to skirts and dresses as the standard outfit in workplaces such as offices by the late 1950s. It was not until capri pants became fashionable in the late 1950s that significant changes began to manifest.

Jeans (and Bermuda shorts) were prohibited entirely for female students at Penn State University until 1954, when the ban was lifted only for off-campus events. Similarly, pants (and shorts) were not allowed for female students at the University of Florida while on campus until 1958.

In 1959, the Government Code Section 12947.5 (part of the California Fair Employment and Housing Act, passed in California) declared in part, "It shall be an unlawful employment practice for an employer to refuse to permit an employee to wear pants on account of the sex of the employee", with exceptions only for "requiring an employee to wear a costume while that employee is portraying a specific character or dramatic role" and when good cause is shown. Thus, the standard California FEHA discrimination complaint form now includes an option for "denied the right to wear pants".

=== 1960s and 1970s ===
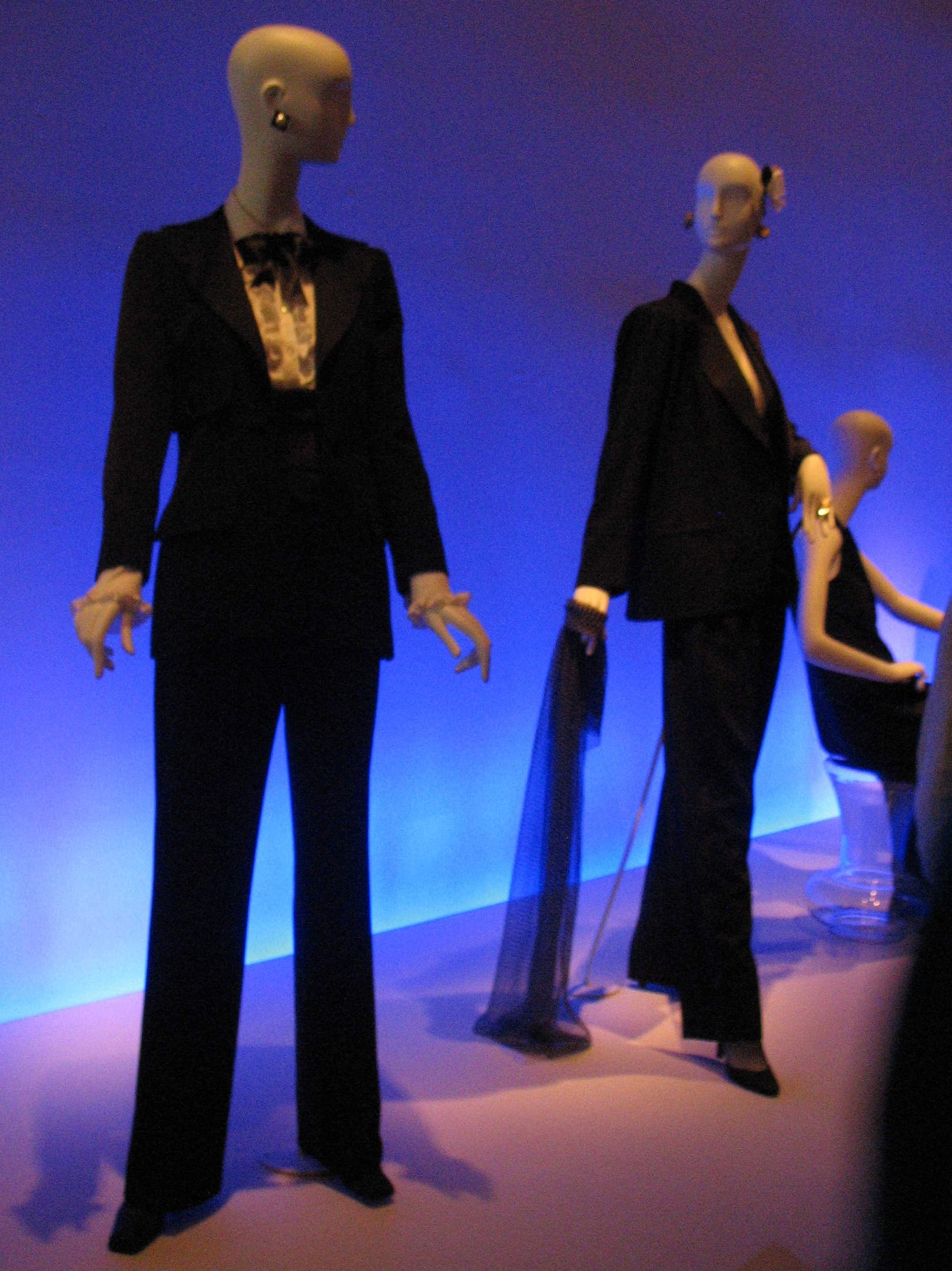
Yves Saint Laurent, Le Smoking, 1966

In the spring of 1960, Columbia University president Grayson Kirk complained to the president of Barnard College (a women's college) that Barnard students were wearing inappropriate clothing. The garments in question were pants and Bermuda shorts. The administration forced the student council to institute a dress code. Students would be allowed to wear shorts and pants only at Barnard and only if the shorts were no more than two inches above the knee and the pants were not tight. Barnard women crossing the street to enter the Columbia campus wearing shorts or pants were required to cover themselves with a long coat.

In the 1960s, André Courrèges introduced jeans for women, leading to the era of designer jeans. And in 1966, Yves Saint Laurent introduced Le Smoking, a woman's tuxedo intended for formal occasions.

During the 1960s, some upscale restaurants resisted modern fashion trends by refusing to admit women wearing pants, which were considered inappropriate by some proprietors. This posed a problem for women who did not want to wear the skirt styles that were then in fashion. Some women opted to circumvent restaurant bans on women in pants by wearing palazzo pants or culottes as evening wear.

In 1969 Rep. Charlotte Reid (R-Ill.) became the first woman to wear trousers in the U.S. Congress.

In 1972, Pat Nixon was the first American First Lady to model trousers in a national magazine. However, First Ladies had been seen earlier wearing trousers, including Lou Hoover (photographed privately wearing riding trousers at the presidential retreat Camp Rapidan) and Jackie Kennedy (photographed wearing trousers and a sweater on Cape Cod in 1960 and wearing palazzo pants in Italy in 1962).

In 1972, the Education Amendments of 1972 passed in the United States, which included Title IX non-discrimination provisions regarding sex. However, this did not change dress codes in schools, though some have argued it should.

In the 1970s, trousers became quite fashionable for women. Jane Fonda, Diana Ross, Katharine Hepburn, Tatum O'Neal, and Diane Keaton all helped to popularise the wearing of trousers, appearing at high-profile awards ceremonies dressed in suits or trouser ensembles; Tatum O'Neal notably accepted an Oscar at age 10 while wearing a tuxedo.

=== 1980s and 1990s ===
In the 1980s in Puerto Rico, Ana Irma Rivera Lassén was not allowed to enter court in trousers and was told to wear a skirt. She sued the judge and won.

In 1989 California state senator Rebecca Morgan became the first woman to wear trousers in a U.S. state senate.

In 1990, the gay newspaper OutWeek covered the Lesbian Ladies Society, a Washington, D.C.–based social group of "feminine lesbians" that required women to wear a dress or skirt (therefore not trousers) to its functions.

Women were not allowed to wear trousers on the U.S. Senate floor until 1993, although the rule was seldom enforced. In 1993, Senators Barbara Mikulski and Carol Moseley Braun wore trousers onto the floor in defiance of the rule, and female support staff followed soon after, with the rule being amended later that year by Senate Sergeant-at-Arms Martha Pope to allow women to wear trousers on the floor so long as they also wore a jacket.

== 21st century ==
=== 2000-2010 ===
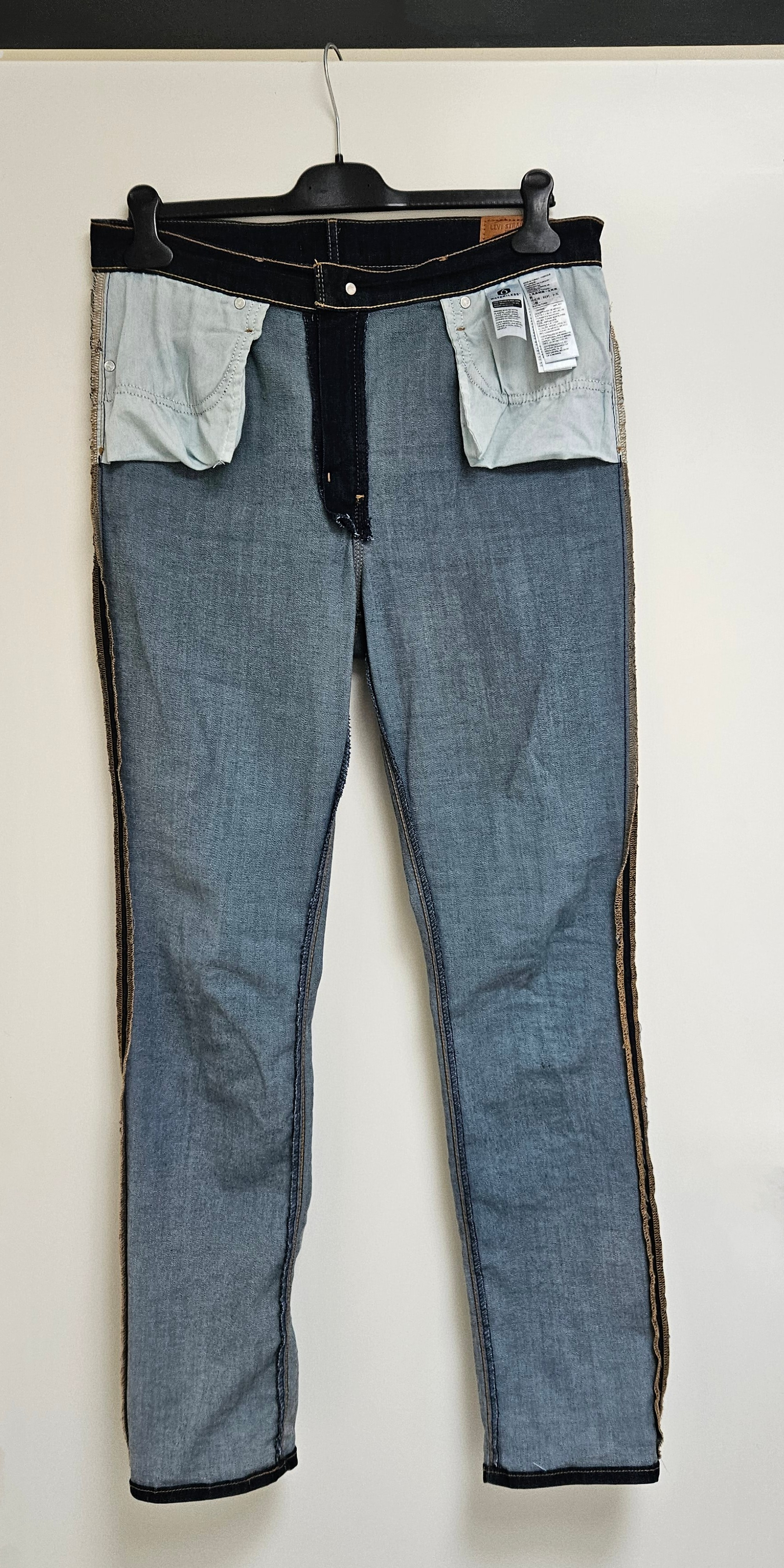
Women's Levi's jeans inside out (2023)

Hillary Clinton was the first woman to wear trousers in an official U.S. First Lady portrait; this portrait was painted by Simmie Knox and unveiled in 2004.

Since 2004 the International Skating Union has allowed women to wear trousers instead of skirts in figure skating competition if they wish. This ended a skirts-only costume rule for women that was instituted in 1988, after American skater Debi Thomas wore a unitard (during the so-called "Battle of the Carmens"). The ISU costume rule from 1988 to 2004 stated amongst other things: "Ladies must wear a skirt. The ladies dress must not give the effect of excessive nudity inappropriate for an athletic sport."

=== 2010 - 2020 ===
The Badminton World Federation and Octagon developed a rule that women badminton players must wear dresses or skirts "to ensure attractive presentation", but although it was included in the official rulebook in 2011, it was dropped before it was supposed to go into effect in 2012.

From 1800 until 2013, women in Paris, France were technically forbidden from wearing trousers without permission from police, with only a few exceptions. Enforcement of this largely stopped during World War I and after, however.

Also in 2013, Turkey's parliament ended a ban on women lawmakers wearing trousers in its assembly.

In 2014, an Indian family court in Mumbai ruled that a husband objecting to his wife wearing a kurta and jeans and forcing her to wear a sari amounts to cruelty inflicted by the husband and can be a grounds for divorce. The wife was thus granted a divorce on the ground of cruelty as defined under section 27(1)(d) of Special Marriage Act, 1954.

From 1991 until 2019 in Sudan, Article 152 of the Memorandum to the 1991 Penal Code prohibited the wearing of "obscene outfits" in public. It was controversial for various reasons; for example, because it was used to punish women who wore trousers in public by lashing them 40 times. Thirteen women including journalist Lubna al-Hussein were arrested in Khartoum in July 2009 for wearing trousers; ten of the women pleaded guilty and were flogged with ten lashes and fined 250 Sudanese pounds apiece. Lubna al-Hussein considered herself a good Muslim and asserted: "Islam does not say whether a woman can wear trousers or not. I'm not afraid of being flogged. It doesn't hurt. But it is insulting." She was eventually found guilty and fined the equivalent of $200 rather than being flogged. On 29 November 2019, Article 152 of the Criminal Code (commonly referred to as the Public Order Law or the Public Order Act) was repealed as part of the 2019–2022 Sudanese transition to democracy. According to Ihsan Fagiri, leader of the No to Oppression Against Women Initiative, around 45,000 women were prosecuted under the Public Order Act in 2016 alone. The repeal was seen as an important first step towards gradual legal reform to improve the status of women's rights in the country as envisioned by the Draft Constitutional Declaration (or Charter).

=== 2020 - 2030 ===
In 2021, following a petition by University of Oxford rower Georgia Grant that gained over 1500 signatures, Henley Royal Regatta changed the dress code in the Stewards' Enclosure, a dress code which was begun in the late 1970s, to allow women to wear jackets or blazers with trousers, or trouser suits.

The International Hockey Federation allowed shorts for women in 2023, dropping the skirt requirement due to concerns of embarrassment. Female umpires were traditionally skirted as well.

In 2024 the Governing Body of Jehovah's Witnesses announced in a video that Jehovah's Witness women “may choose to wear slacks when participating in the ministry and when attending Christian meetings, assemblies, and conventions”, but also that the slacks worn for this “should not be casual but dignified, modest, and appropriate” and that when a woman “has a part on the program, she should wear a skirt or a dress if that is the standard of dress in that land.” The video also added that when visiting Bethel, it would be appropriate for women to “wear a skirt or a dress if that is the standard of dress in that land.” (Jehovah's Witnesses establish branch offices to manage their activities in various countries or regions, and each branch office is also referred to as Bethel.)

=== Workplace norms ===
In 2012, the Royal Canadian Mounted Police began to allow women to wear trousers and boots with all their formal uniforms.

In 2015, Air India began to allow its female flight attendants to wear trousers with two out of three types of uniform; however, a spokesperson for Air India stated that, "use of a particular uniform will be based on destinations of travel" rather than the attendant's choice.

Until 2016, some female crew members on British Airways were required to wear British Airways' standard "ambassador" uniform, which has not traditionally included trousers.

In 2017, The Church of Jesus Christ of Latter-day Saints announced that its female employees could wear "professional pantsuits and dress slacks" while at work; dresses and skirts had previously been required. In 2018 that same church declared that their female missionaries could wear dress slacks if they wanted, except when attending the temple and during Sunday worship services, baptismal services, and mission leadership and zone conferences.

In 2018, the New York Philharmonic changed its dress code, allowing its female musicians to wear pants at its evening concerts; they had been required to wear floor-length black skirts or gowns at them before this.

In 2019, Virgin Atlantic began to allow its female flight attendants to wear trousers.

In 2020, Aer Lingus and Japan Airlines began to allow their female flight attendants to wear trousers.

=== School norms ===
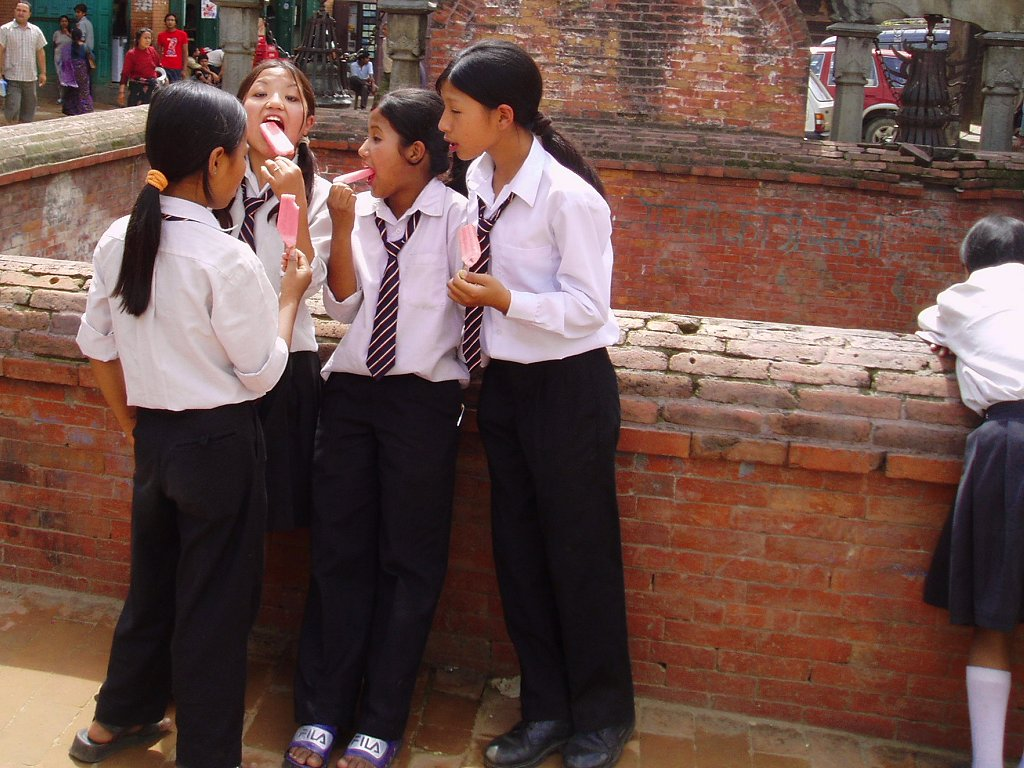
School girls in Nepal wearing trousers

Most United Kingdom schools allow girls to wear trousers, but many girls still wear skirts in primary and secondary schools, even where the choice of trousers is given. In the late 20th and early 21st century, many schools began changing their uniform rules to allow trousers for girls amidst opposition to skirts-only policies. In 1998, it was announced that sixth-form girls at Cheltenham Ladies' College would be allowed to wear trousers for the first time. In June 1999, University Professor Claire Hale took legal action against Whickham School when they refused permission to allow her daughter Jo Hale to wear trousers. Amongst others, the Equal Opportunities Commission decided to back the case. On 24 February 2000 the school avoided a legal battle by announcing that, in future, girls would be able to wear trousers. In 2025, a law was passed in Northern Ireland granting girls a legal right to challenge schools that prohibit them from wearing trousers.

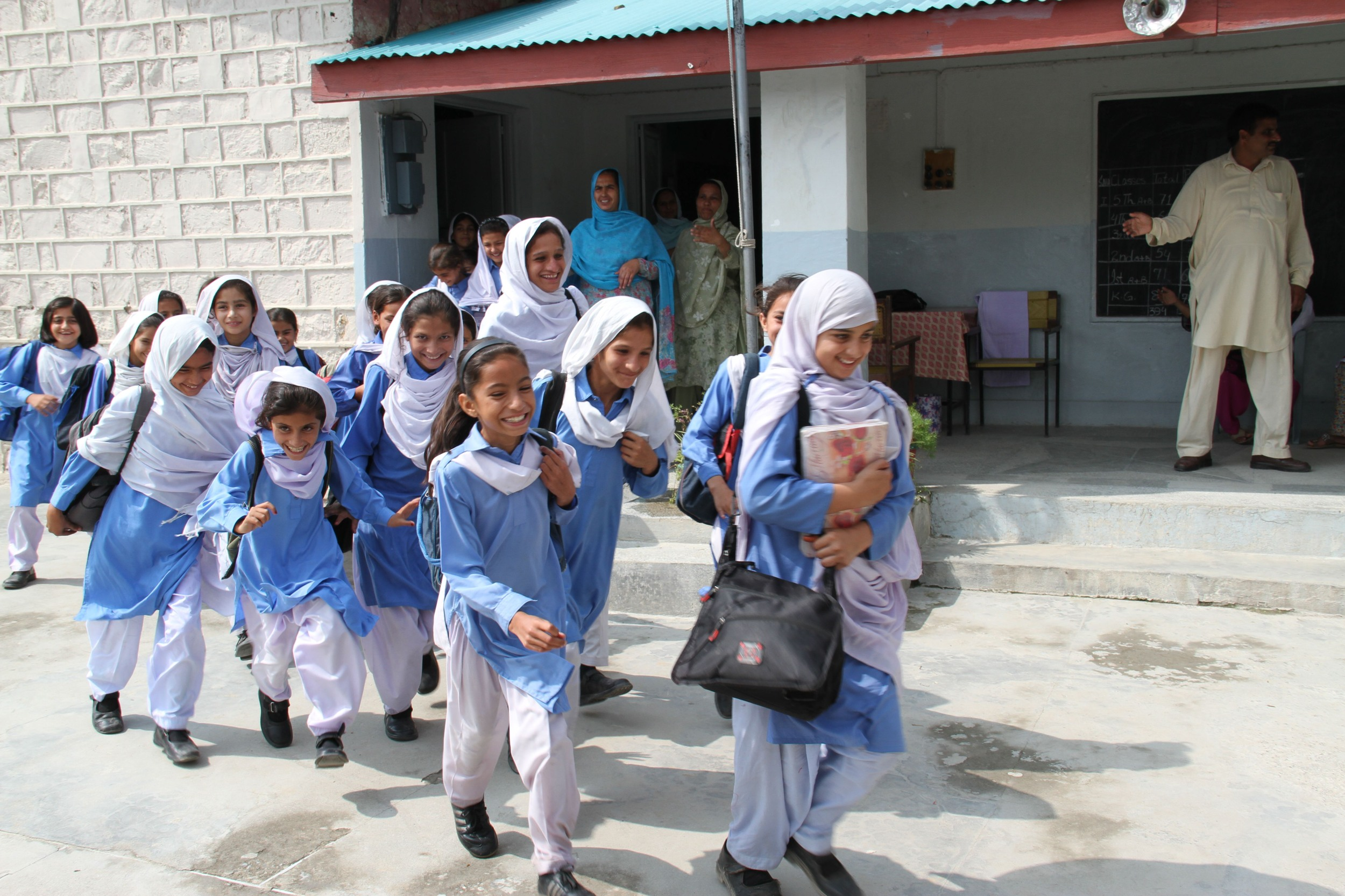
Shalwar kameez as school uniform in Pakistan

In June 2022, the United States Court of Appeals for the Fourth Circuit ruled against the Charter Day School in North Carolina, which had required girls to wear skirts due to the idea that girls are "fragile vessels" deserving "gentle" treatment from boys. The court ruled the requirement was unconstitutional. In September, 2022, the school appealed to the Supreme Court of the United States. On January 9, 2023, the Supreme Court asked the U.S. government, through U.S. Solicitor General Elizabeth Prelogar, for a brief on whether they should hear the case. Ten Republican state attorneys general, led by Ken Paxton of Texas, backed the school in briefs to the Supreme Court. However, the Supreme Court declined to hear the case. The dress code at the school was changed to let girls wear trousers.

In 2024 the Queensland Civil and Administrative Tribunal ruled that a private school did not act unlawfully by requiring girls to wear skirts for formal occasions.

== Remaining prohibitions ==
=== Religion ===
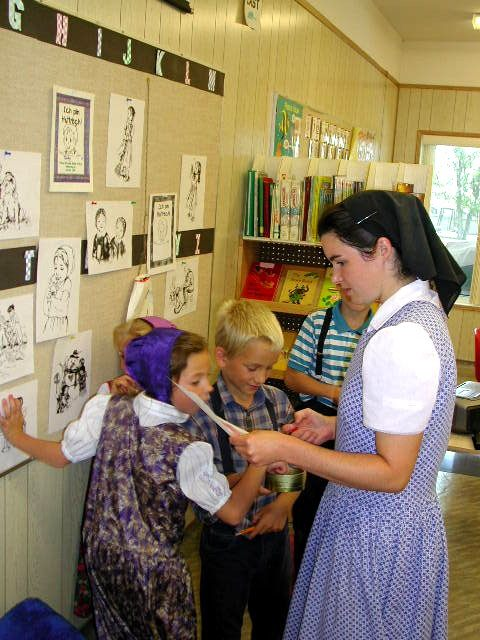
Hutterites, an Anabaptist Christian denomination, practice the wearing of plain clothing, in which females wear full length dresses or skirts whose hemlines extend beyond the knees, along with headcoverings.

There are a number of denominations within mainstream religions, such as in Islam, Judaism, and Christianity, that wish to enforce what they see as a distinction in the sexes, as well as the prohibition of women revealing the contour legs, requiring all women and young girls to wear a long dress or skirt rather than trousers.

In Orthodox Judaism, the wearing of trousers by women, which they consider to be men's clothing, is forbidden biblically under the prohibition of Lo Silbash in the Bible ("A woman shall not wear that which pertaineth unto a man", Deuteronomy 22:5). As such, Orthodox Jewish women wear headcoverings, as well as dresses whose sleeves extend beyond the elbows and hemlines fall below the knees.

Among Christians who are Conservative Mennonites and Old Order Mennonites, long skirts or dresses covering most of the legs are required, along with head coverings. They also wear dresses and skirts because they believe men and women should be distinguished from one another, citing Deuteronomy 22:5, "The woman shall not wear that which pertaineth unto a man, neither shall a man put on a woman's garment: for all that do so are abomination unto the Lord thy God" (KJV). Conservative conferences usually demand that women wear a specific style of dress, which is usually in the style of the cape dress with a double covering or "cape". However, most non-conservative conferences of (mainline) Mennonites allow for the wearing of trousers by women.

Methodist Christians of the conservative holiness movement believe that modern popular practice of the wearing of trousers by women blurs the distinction between men and women; adherent Muslims teach that trousers should not be worn by women as they reveal the contour of the legs that should be hidden to maintain traditional religious definitions of modesty, in addition to the belief that trousers are male clothing. Methodist Christians belonging to the conservative holiness movement thus wear dresses or skirts with hemlines that extend beyond the knees; this practice extends from daily wear to activities such as swimming, in which many Holiness Methodist women wear swimming dresses, rather than contemporary bathing suits (cf. Wesleyan-Arminian doctrine of outward holiness). The 2015 Discipline of the Evangelical Wesleyan Church, a Methodist denomination in the conservative holiness movement, teaches:

We require our women to appear in public with dresses of modest length, sleeves of modest length, modest necklines and modest hose; the wearing of split skirts, slacks, jeans, artificial flowers or feathers is forbidden. Moreover, we require our men to conform to the scriptural standards of decent and modest attire; we require that when they appear in public they wear shirts with sleeves of modest length. We require that all our people appear in public with sleeves below the elbows. Women's hemlines are to be modestly below the knees. Our people are forbidden to appear in public with transparent or immodest apparel, including shorts or bathing suits. Parents are required to dress their children modestly in conformity with our general principles of Christian attire. We further prohibit our people from participating in the practices of body-piercing, tattooing or body art.

Some Quaker Christian groups, the Central Yearly Meeting of Friends, practice the wearing of plain dress, in which females wear dresses with sleeves that do not expose elbows and hemlines that reach the mid-calf level or skirts that are similarly designed (cf. testimony of simplicity).

In many traditional Catholic Christian circles, the wearing of trousers is discouraged, especially while attending church. The Sacred Congregation of the Council under Pope Pius XI issued guidelines for women's dress in 1956: "A dress cannot be called decent which is cut deeper than two fingers' breadth under the pit of the throat, which does not cover the arms at least to the elbows and scarcely reaches a bit below the knees. Furthermore, dresses of transparent materials are improper." Cardinal Siri's letter on dress has been cited as justification for women wearing skirts and dresses as opposed to trousers. In addition, Saint Thomas Aquinas, an esteemed Catholic theologian, taught that "outward apparel should be consistent with the estate of the person, according to the general custom. Hence it is in itself sinful for a woman to wear man's clothes, or vice versa; and it is expressly forbidden in the Law (Deuteronomy 22)..." As such, the Society of Saint Pius X have spoken of the preference of women's wearing skirts rather than trousers.

Pentecostal Christian women typically wear long skirts because of the Biblical commandment in the Old Testament that women must not wear men's clothing; this is mandatory in Holiness Pentecostal churches (such as the Apostolic Faith Church), as well as in Oneness Pentecostal churches (such as the United Pentecostal Church).

Many Independent Fundamental Baptist churches, colleges and universities prohibit females from wearing trousers. For example, at Pensacola Christian College, female students may only wear trousers or shorts for "recreational purposes" only. They are also required to wear skirts or dresses until 5:00 PM on workdays.

In 2012 and 2013, some Mormon women participated in "Wear Pants to Church Day", in which they wore trousers to church instead of the customary dresses to encourage gender equality within the Church of Jesus Christ of Latter-day Saints (LDS Church). Over one thousand women participated in this in 2012. In 2017, the LDS Church announced that its female employees could wear "professional pantsuits and dress slacks" while at work; dresses and skirts had previously been required. In 2018 the LDS Church declared that their female missionaries could wear dress slacks if they wanted, except when attending the temple and during Sunday worship services, baptismal services, and mission leadership and zone conferences.

In 2024 the Governing Body of Jehovah's Witnesses announced in a video that Jehovah's Witness women “may choose to wear slacks when participating in the ministry and when attending Christian meetings, assemblies, and conventions”, but also that the slacks worn for this “should not be casual but dignified, modest, and appropriate” and that when a woman “has a part on the program, she should wear a skirt or a dress if that is the standard of dress in that land.” The video also added that when visiting Bethel, it would be appropriate for women to “wear a skirt or a dress if that is the standard of dress in that land.” (Jehovah's Witnesses establish branch offices to manage their activities in various countries or regions, and each branch office is also referred to as Bethel.)

=== Dancing ===
Many forms of dancing require females to wear skirts or dresses, either by convention or competition rules. In Scottish highland dancing, for example, women do not wear trews, but instead either wear a skirt or dress including the Aboyne dress (for the national dances) or the kilt-based outfit for the Highland dances. However, tartan trews can be worn by women in the United States.

== Pockets ==
Historically, the term "pocket" referred to a pouch worn around the waist by women in the 17th to 19th centuries, mentioned in the rhyme Lucy Locket. In these pockets, women would carry items needed in their daily lives, such as scissors, pins and needles, and keys.

"Only 40 percent of women's front pockets can completely fit one of the three leading smartphone brands. Less than half of women's front pockets can fit a wallet specifically designed to fit in front pockets. And you can't even cram an average woman's hand beyond the knuckles into the majority of women's front pockets."

— The Pudding, "Women's Pockets Are Inferior" (2018)

In more modern clothing, while men's clothes generally have pockets, women's often do not – and sometimes have what are called Potemkin pockets, a fake slit sewn shut. In 1954, French fashion designer Christian Dior allegedly stated: 'Men have pockets to keep things in, women for decoration.' If there are pockets, they are often much smaller than in men's clothes. While in the early 2000s, manufacturers were competing to make the smallest mobile phones possible, the 2007 introduction of the iPhone began the age of the smartphone, which instead had an ever-greater focus on large interactive touchscreens. By 2019, the average smartphone had grown to a diagonal screen size of 5.5 inches (c. 14 centimetres), while in 2018, journalists at The Pudding found less than half of women's front pockets could fit a thin wallet, let alone a handheld phone and keys. 'On average, the pockets in women's jeans are 48% shorter and 6.5% narrower than men's pockets.'

Caroline Criado Perez (2019) criticised Apple and other manufacturers for failing to take into account that the development of these phones towards ever-greater sizes ignored the smaller average pocket sizes in women's trousers, the smaller average sizes of women's hands compared to men's (thus making it harder to simply hold larger phones in their hands), as well as the fact that more women than men owned iPhones. Although many women are happy to carry phones and other items in handbags instead of in pockets, as most men do, "one of the reasons women carry [handbags] in the first place is because our clothes lack adequate pockets". A further complication is that many passive-tracking mobile apps have been designed with the assumption that "your phone will be either in your hands or in your pockets at all times, rather than sitting in your handbag on your office desk." A classic example of a passive-tracking app that will thus not work properly for many women is a step-counter (which records how many steps the phone user has taken in a day while walking), because women's trousers often do not have large enough pockets to always be carrying around that phone with the app tracking the steps on it. In one case in South Africa, female health workers were unable to use a newly developed health app, because – for a lack of trousers pockets, and to prevent pickpocketing – they always carried their valuables in their underwear, but the phone (with the health app on it) was too large to fit into their bras either.

== Trousers and sexual violence ==
In Rome in 1992, a 45-year-old driving instructor was accused of raping an 18-year-old student for over an hour. Although he was initially convicted, it was overturned by the Supreme Court of Cassation who claimed "because the victim wore very, very tight jeans, she had to help him remove them...and by removing the jeans...it was no longer rape but consensual sex". The decision opined "it is a fact of common experience that it is nearly impossible to slip off tight jeans even partly without the active collaboration of the person who is wearing them." This ruling sparked widespread feminist protest. The day after the decision, women in the Italian Parliament protested by wearing jeans and holding placards that read "Jeans: An Alibi for Rape." As a sign of support, the California Senate and Assembly followed suit. Soon Patricia Giggans, executive director of the Los Angeles Commission on Assaults Against Women, (now Peace Over Violence) made Denim Day an annual event. As of 2011 at least 20 U.S. states officially recognize Denim Day in April. Wearing jeans on this day, 22 April, has become an international symbol of protest. In 2008 the Supreme Court of Cassation overturned the ruling, so there is no longer a "denim" defense to the charge of rape.

== See also ==
- Bloomers
- Cross-dressing
- Gender-based dress codes
- Men's skirts
- Pantsuit
- Victorian dress reform

== Bibliography ==
- Perez, Caroline Criado (2019). Invisible Women: Exposing Data Bias in a World Designed for Men. London: Chatto & Windus. p. 418. ISBN 9781473548299. (e-book)
- Sears, Clare (2005). "A dress not belonging to his or her sex": Cross-dressing law in San Francisco, 1860–1900 (PhD Thesis). University of California, Santa Cruz. (preview)
- Sears, Clare (31 December 2020). Arresting Dress: Cross-Dressing, Law, and Fascination in Nineteenth-Century San Francisco. Duke University Press. doi:10.1515/9780822376194. ISBN 978-0-8223-7619-4.
