= Peace Over Violence =

Social service agency in Los Angeles

Peace Over Violence is a Los Angeles, California based social service agency dedicated to "the elimination of sexual and domestic violence and all forms of interpersonal violence." Peace Over Violence is a 501(c)3 nonprofit and services are provided for free to survivors and their families.

== Programs and advocacy ==
Executive Director Patti Giggans told VoyageLA Magazine: "Peace Over Violence is known for its longstanding innovative, cutting-edge interventions and healing modalities," and that is "unique in its comprehensive wraparound services to victim survivors of sexual assault, domestic violence, child abuse, and stalking, including a 24-hour crisis hotline, trauma-informed counseling, group therapy, case management, housing and legal assistance, and accompaniment for survivors through the aftermath of their abuse or assault (including in court and at the hospital)."

Peace Over Violence was the foundation responsible for the founding of Denim Day.

They offer classes in self-defense and guides on building safety.

For teens, they have an 11-unit curriculum, infused with arts, called "In Touch With Teens" taught in school districts across the country.

== Organization and personnel ==
Peace Over Violence was founded in 1971, under the name The Los Angeles Commission on Assault Against Women (LACAAW). In 2006, the organization was renamed to Peace Over Violence, "positioning the agency as a leader in the field of family violence and representing an all-inclusive call to action to rally people behind a larger social movement. 'Peace Over Violence' offers a constant reminder that building healthy relationships, families and communities free from sexual, domestic and interpersonal violence is achievable."

Peace Over Violence is run by Executive Director Patti Giggans, who, as of 2024, has been there for over forty years.

== Celebrity endorsements ==
On November 7, 2008 Calista Flockhart hosted the 37th Annual Humanitarian Awards Dinner that benefitted Peace Over Violence. Flockhart serves as National Spokesperson Emeritus for the organization, and when asked about her role with the agency Flockhart responded, “I admire their commitment to ending violence against women, and the important work they do on a daily basis to achieve this goal.”
