= Pocket =

Small compartment in clothing

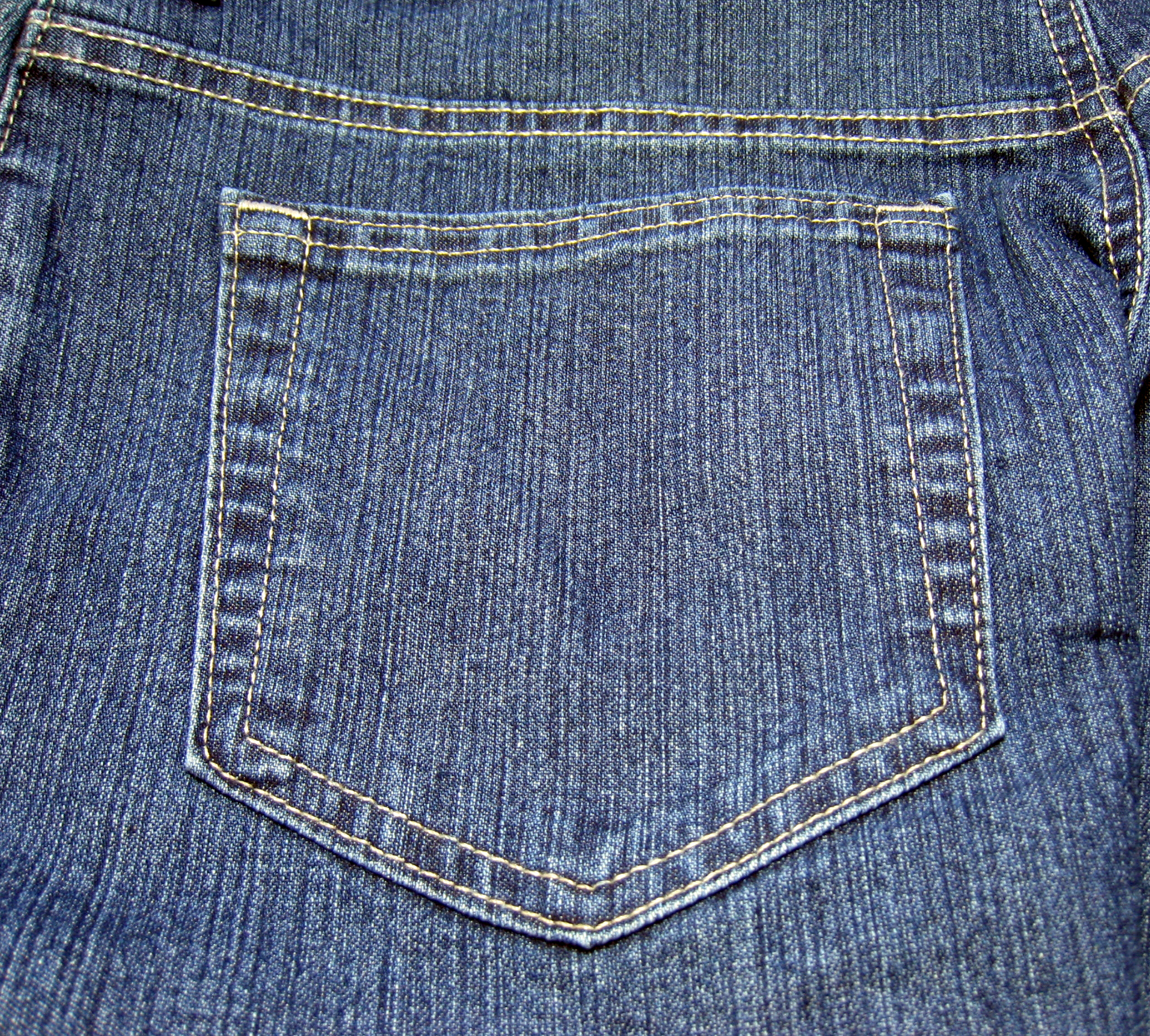
Patch pocket with topstitching and bar tacking on the back of a pair of blue jeans.

A pocket is a small bag- or envelope-shaped compartment that is either sewn into or attached to clothing, designed for carrying small items. Pockets are also found on luggage, backpacks, and similar containers. Historically, the term could also refer to a separate pouch or small bag.

== Origins ==
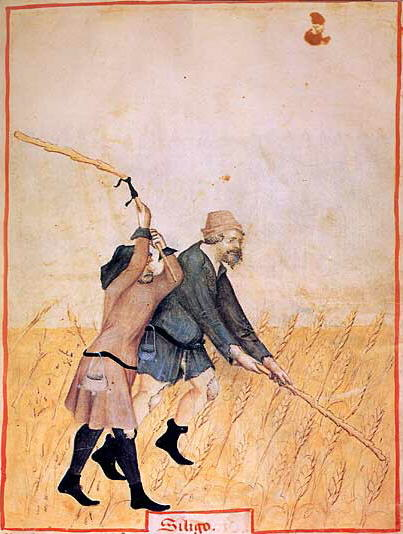
Pockets hang from belts as 15th-century peasants thresh siligo wheat in a Tacuinum Sanitatis

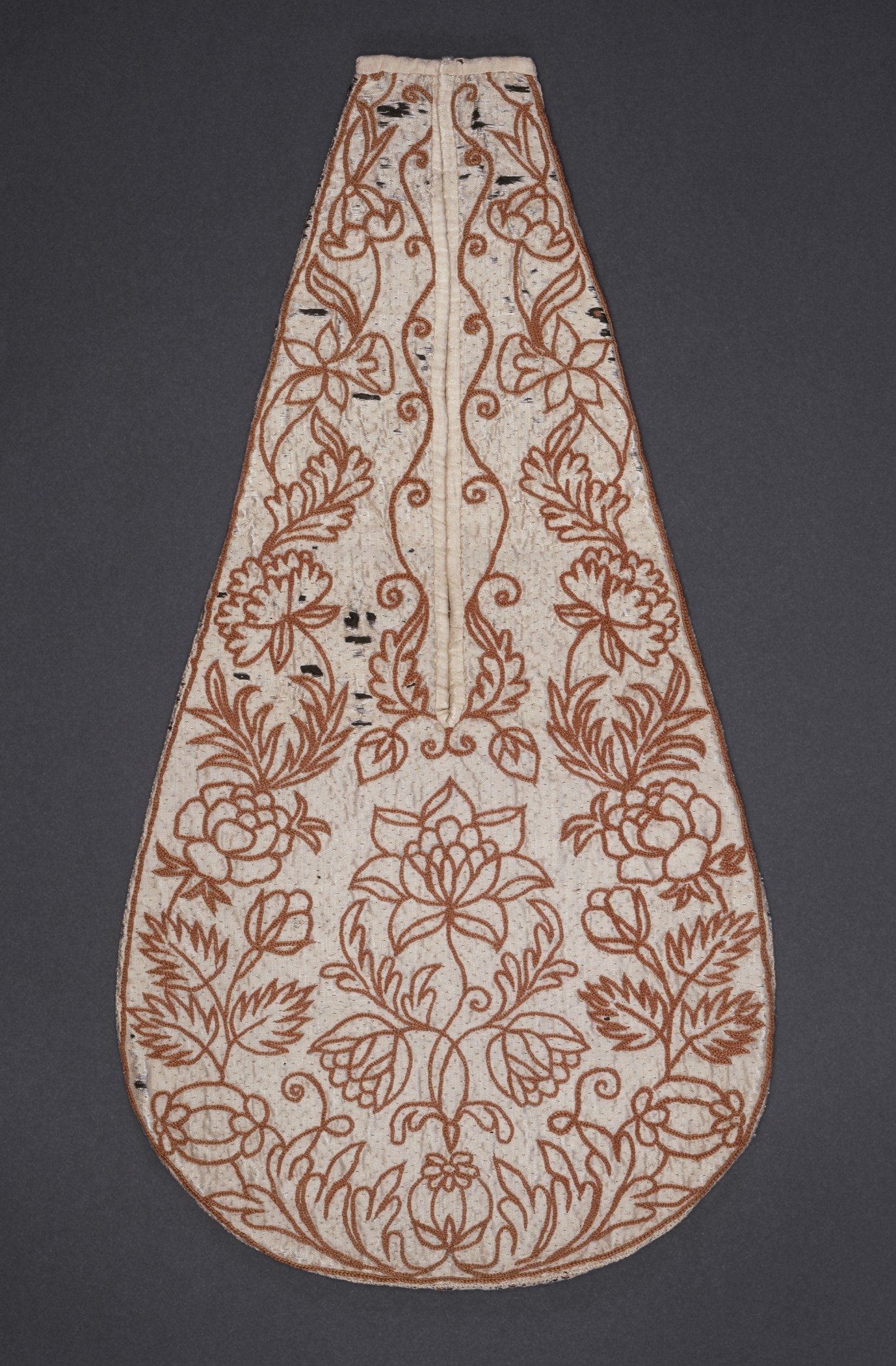
18th-century woman's hanging pocket

Ancient civilizations used leather or cloth pouches to store valuables. The Copper Age mummy known as Ötzi (also called the "Iceman"), who lived around 3,300 BCE, wore a belt with a sewn-on pouch containing tools and materials such as a scraper, drill, flint flake, bone awl, and dried tinder fungus.

In medieval Europe, early pocket-like openings called fitchets appeared in the 13th century. These vertical slits, cut into the outer tunic, allowed access to a purse or keys suspended from the girdle beneath. Historian Rebecca Unsworth notes that pockets became more visible in the late 15th century, and their use spread widely in the 16th century.

Later, pockets were often worn like purses on a belt, concealed under a coat or jerkin to deter pickpocketing, with access through a slit in the outer garment.

By the 17th century, pockets were sewn into men's clothing, while women's remained as separate tie-on pouches hidden beneath skirts.

The word pocket entered Middle English from a Norman diminutive of the Old French poke or pouque, related to modern poche and the English word pouch. The form "poke" is now only used in dialect, or in such proverbial sayings as "a pig in a poke".

In the 17th to 19th centuries, women's tie-on pockets—mentioned in the rhyme Lucy Locket—often carried everyday tools like scissors, pins, needles, and keys.

== Gender differences ==
In modern fashion, men's clothing usually includes pockets, whereas women's clothing often has smaller or even fake ones, sometimes called Potemkin pockets after the concept of a Potemkin village. A 2018 study by the Pudding found that fewer than half of women's front pockets could fit a thin wallet, let alone a phone or keys.

== Types ==
A watch pocket or fob pocket is a small compartment, originally for holding a pocket watch. Fob pockets can feature in men's trousers, waistcoats, and traditional blue jeans. With the decline in pocket-watch use, people have often repurposed these pockets for other small items.

A besom pocket (or slit pocket) is set into the garment rather than sewn on top. The pocket opening is reinforced—often with an extra strip of fabric or decorative stitching—and may be secured with a flap or button. Besom pockets are common on tuxedo jackets and trousers.

Camp pockets (or cargo pockets) are sewn onto the outside of the garment; they are typically square or rectangular with visible seams. They are common on utilitarian clothing and outdoor gear.

A beer pocket is a small compartment within a jacket or vest – sized to hold a bottle of beer. It was popular in some areas of the American Midwest during the 1910s, before Prohibition (1920 to 1933) caused it to fade from fashion. The style saw minor revivals in the 1980s and early 2000s.

=== Examples of pocket designs ===
In some of the following illustrations, a folded blue handkerchief is included for illustration purposes:

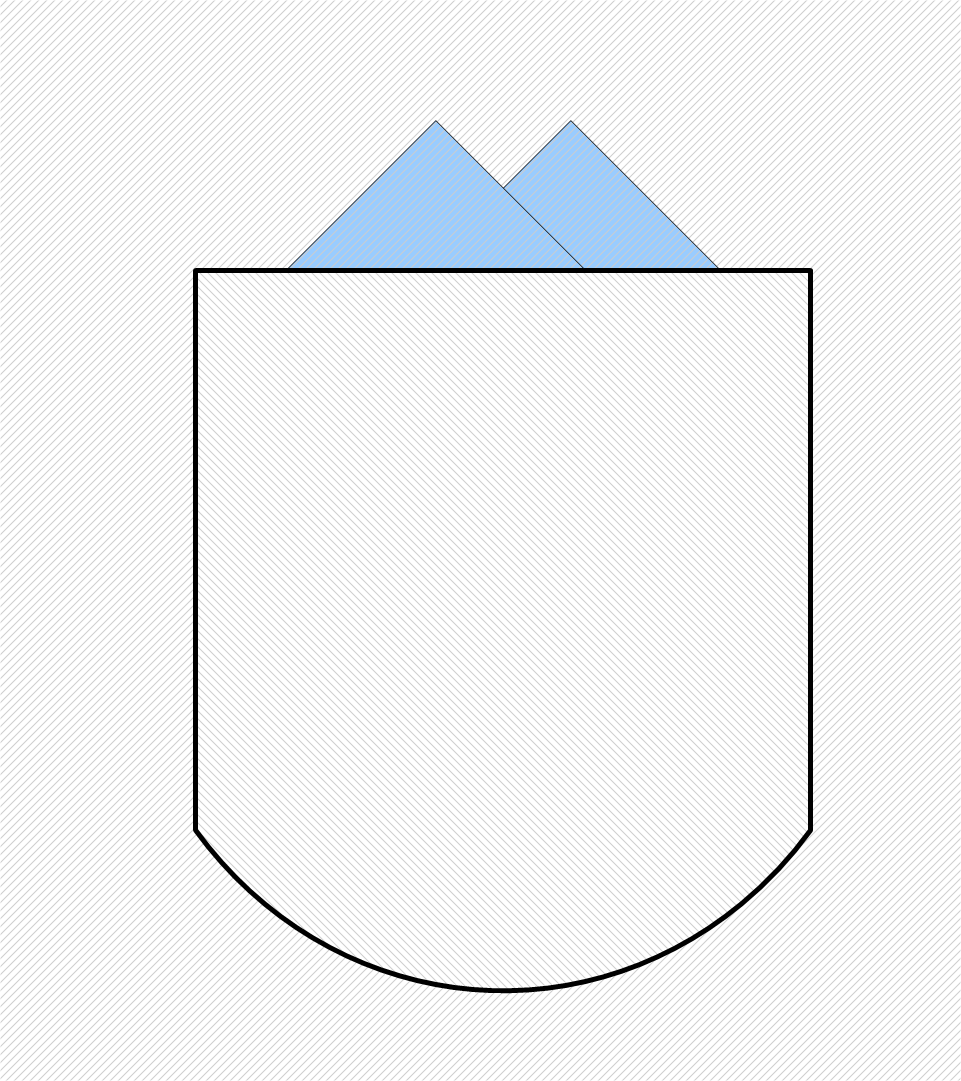
Patch pocket with pocket square

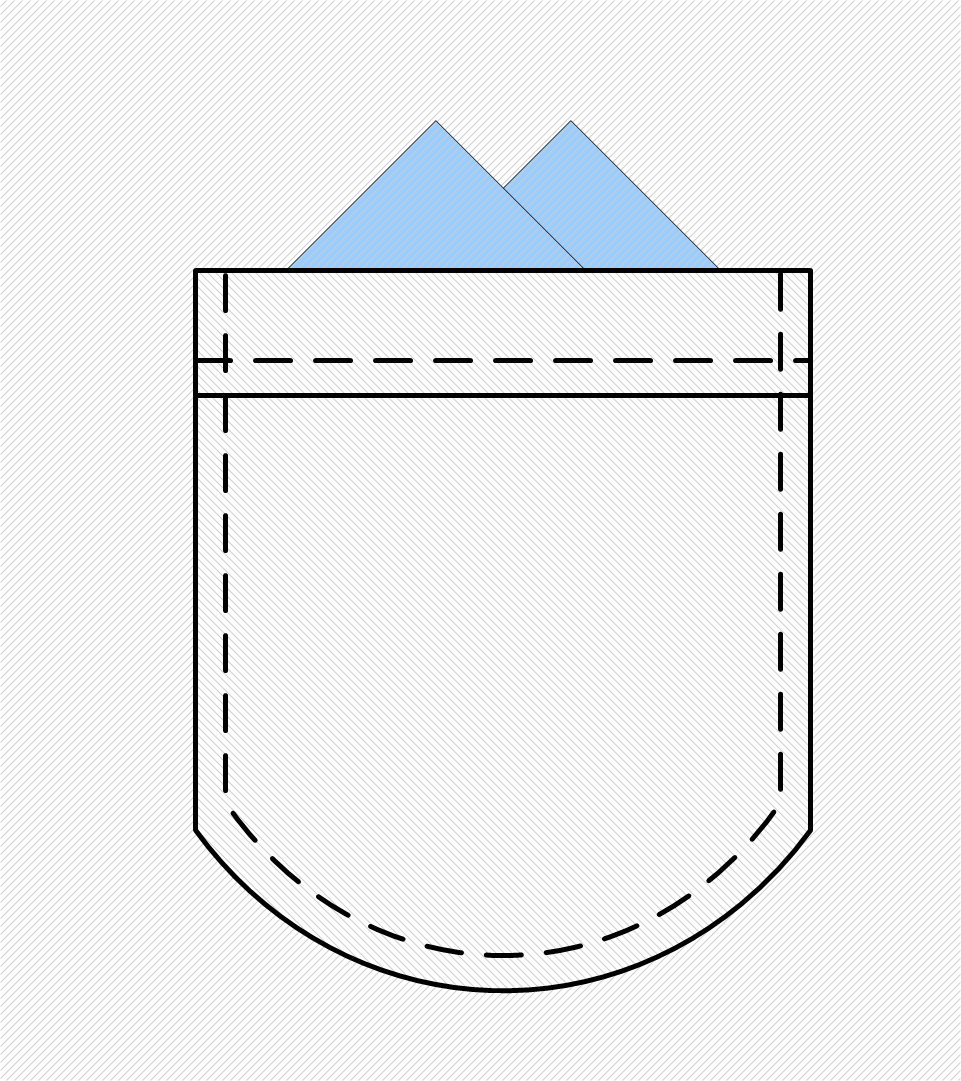
Patch pocket with topstitching

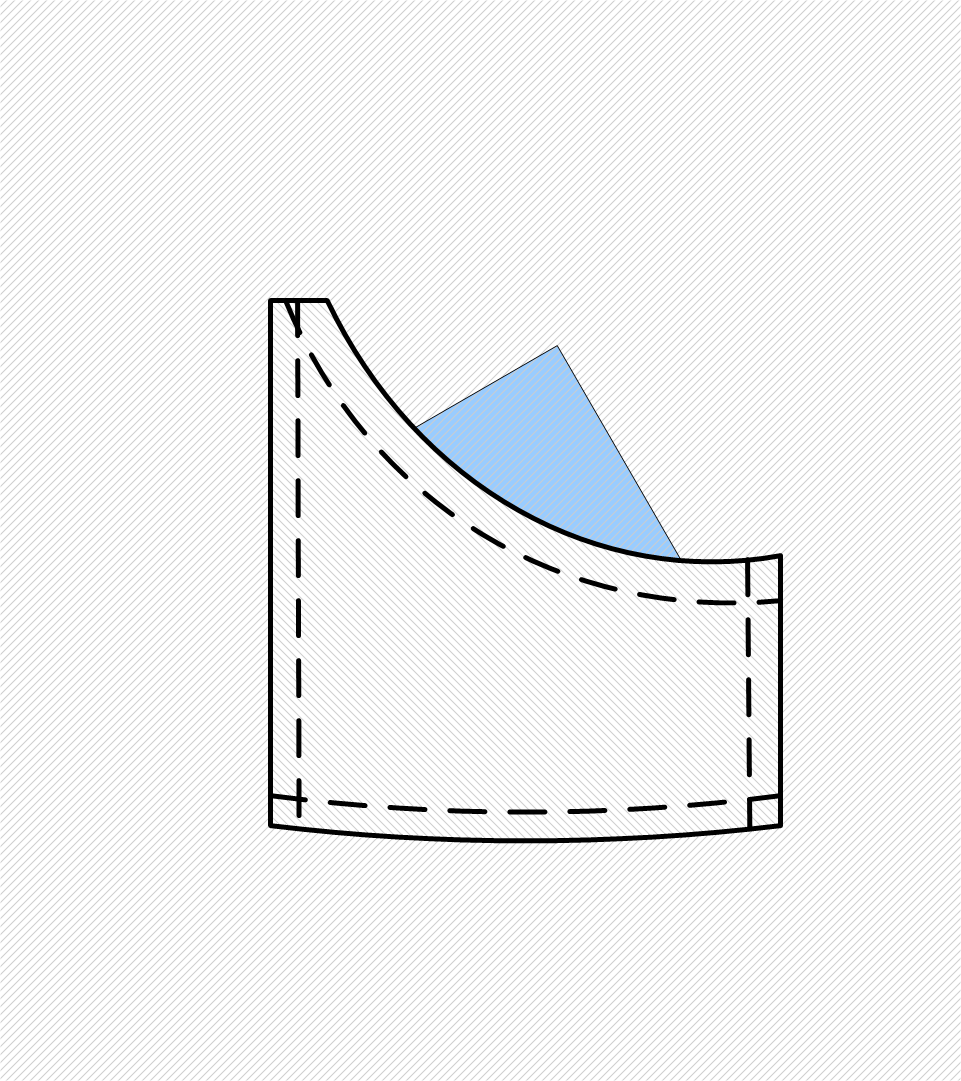
J patch pocket

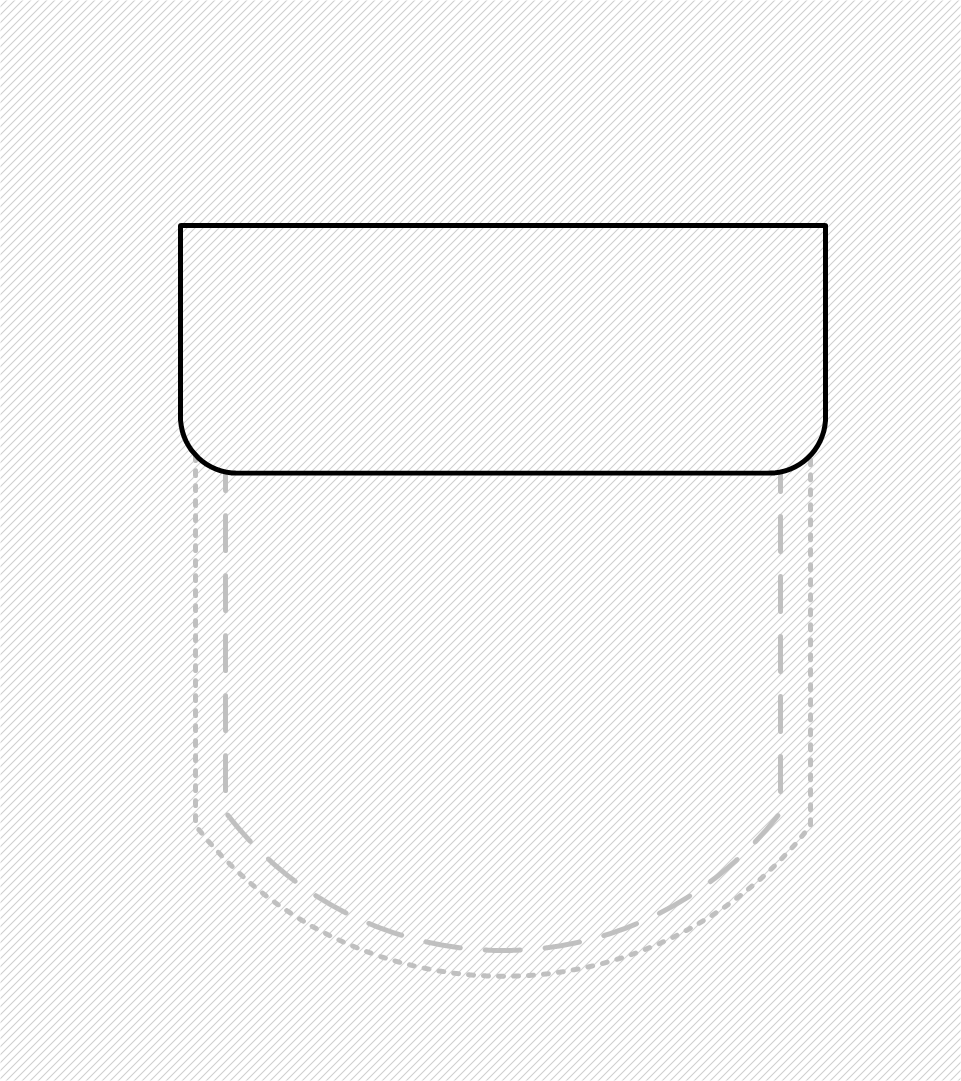
Flap pocket

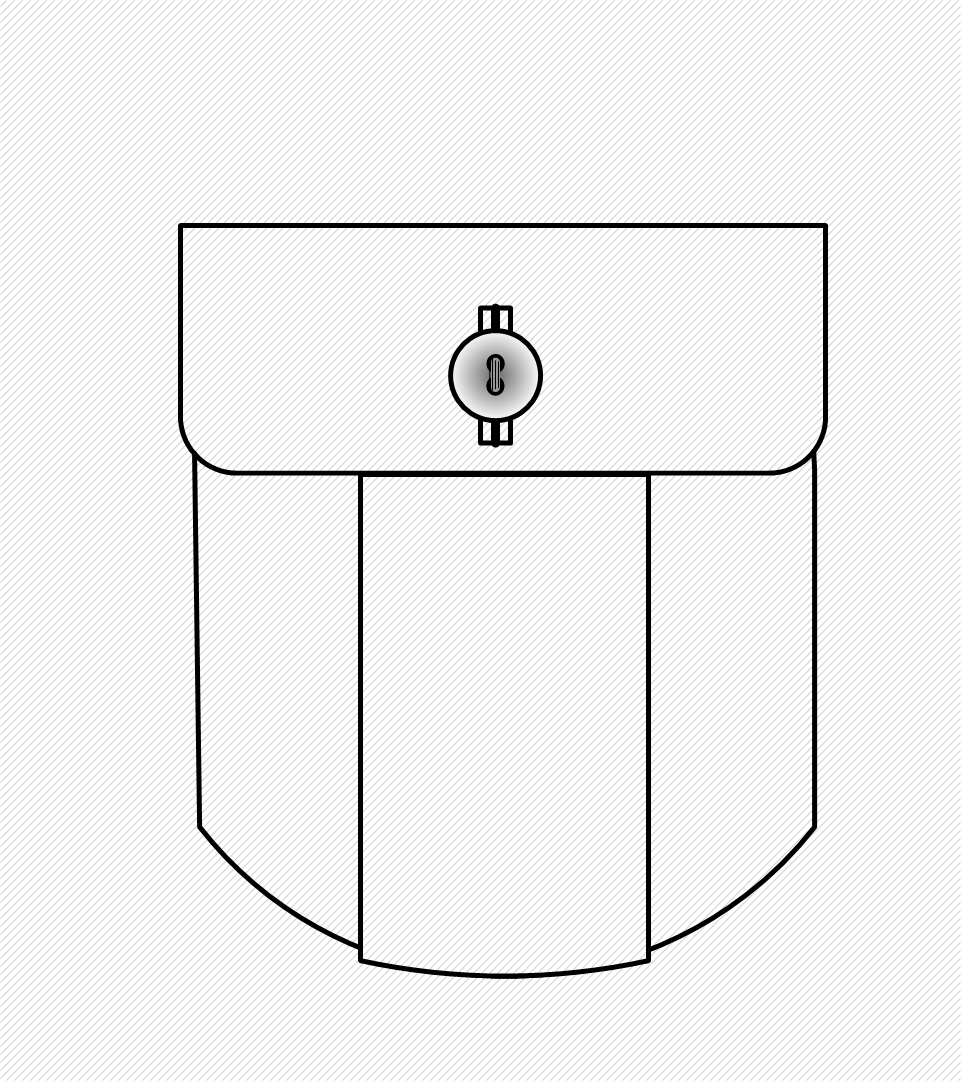
Buttoned-flap patch pocket with box pleat

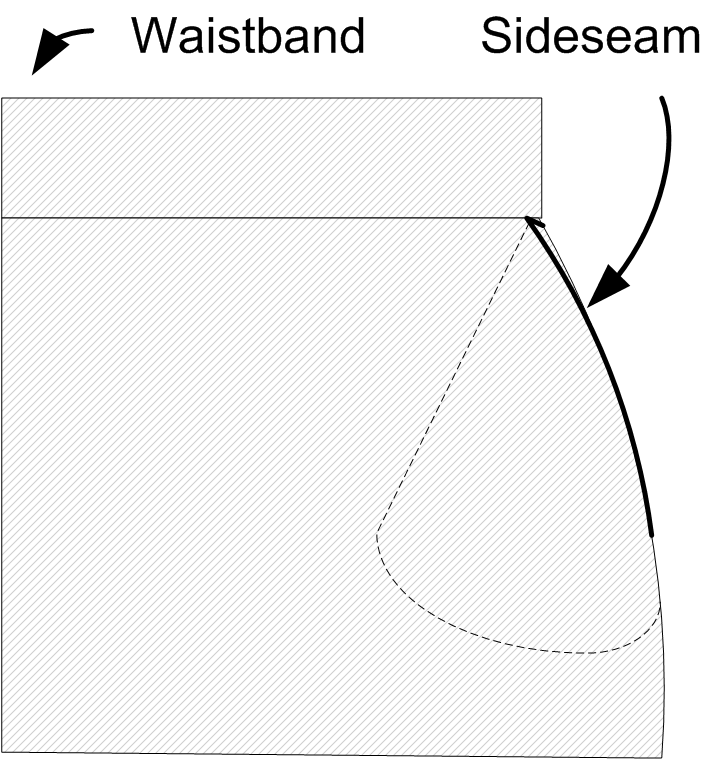
Sideseam pocket

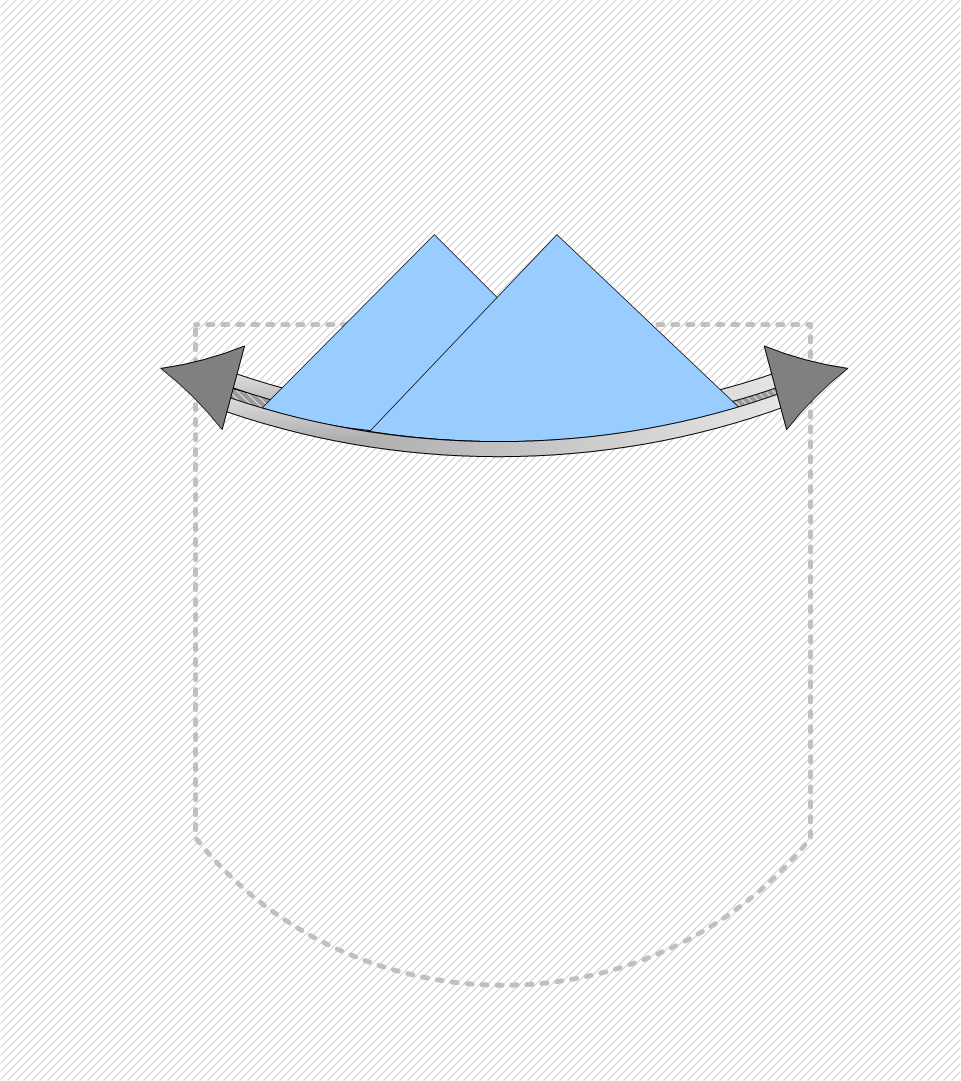
"Smile" slit pocket with piping and arrowhead reinforcements, typical of Western wear

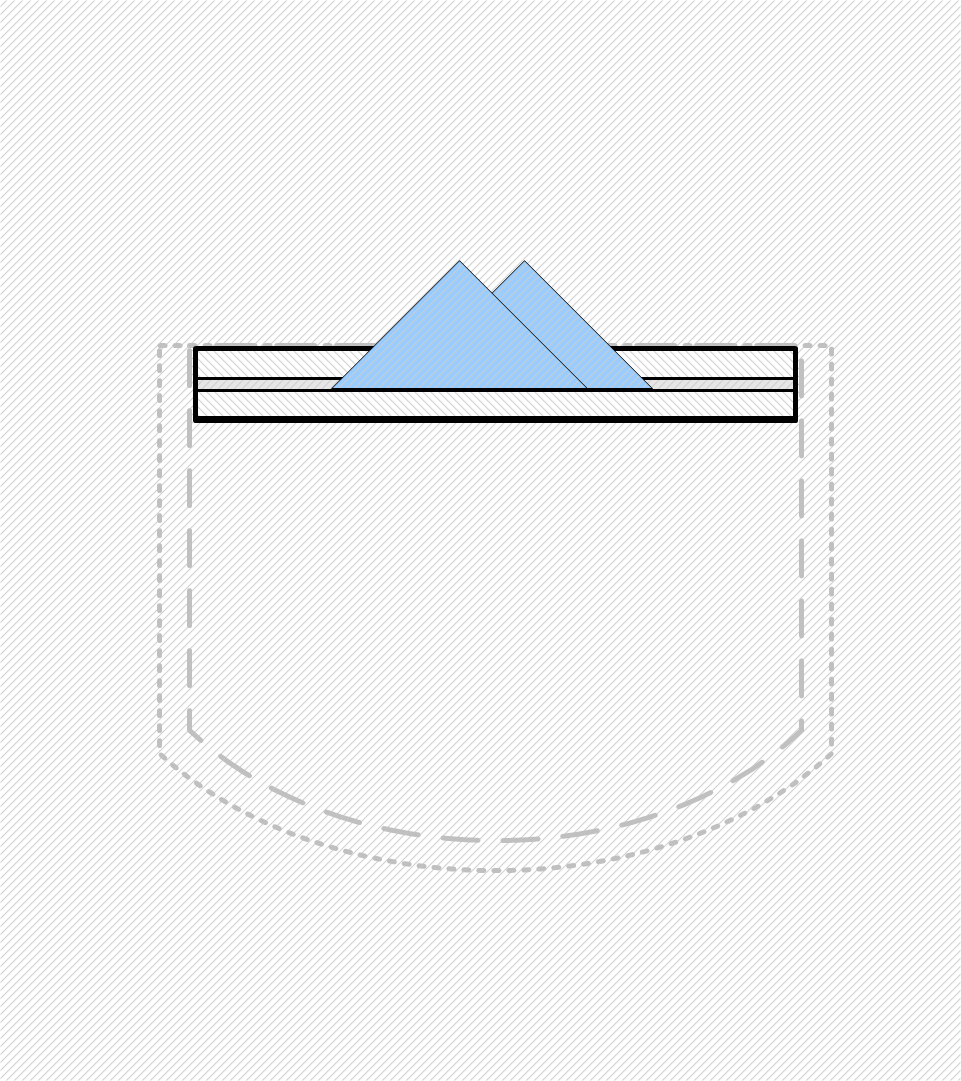
Double-jetted pocket

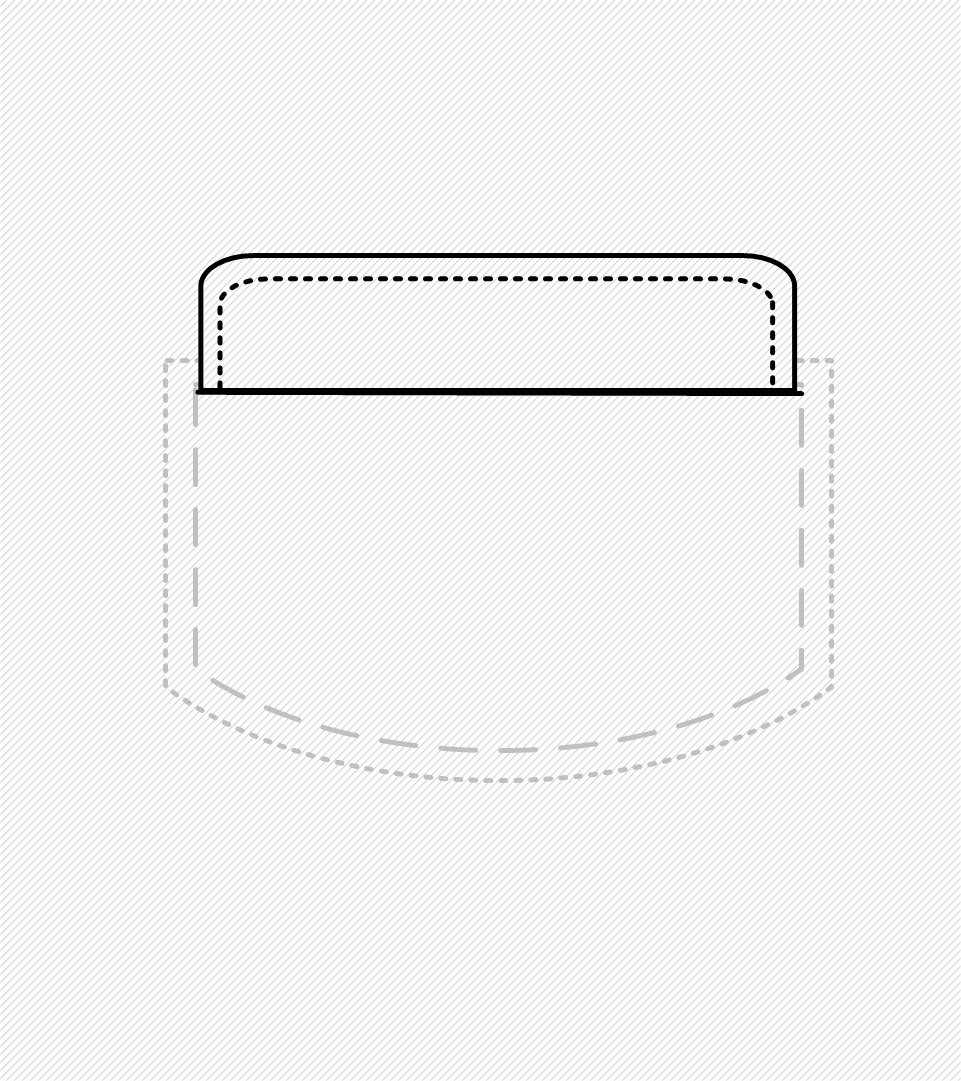
Stand or single-welt pocket
Slant-front or slash pockets

Curved inset pockets, with a coin- or watch-pocket on the right front pocket

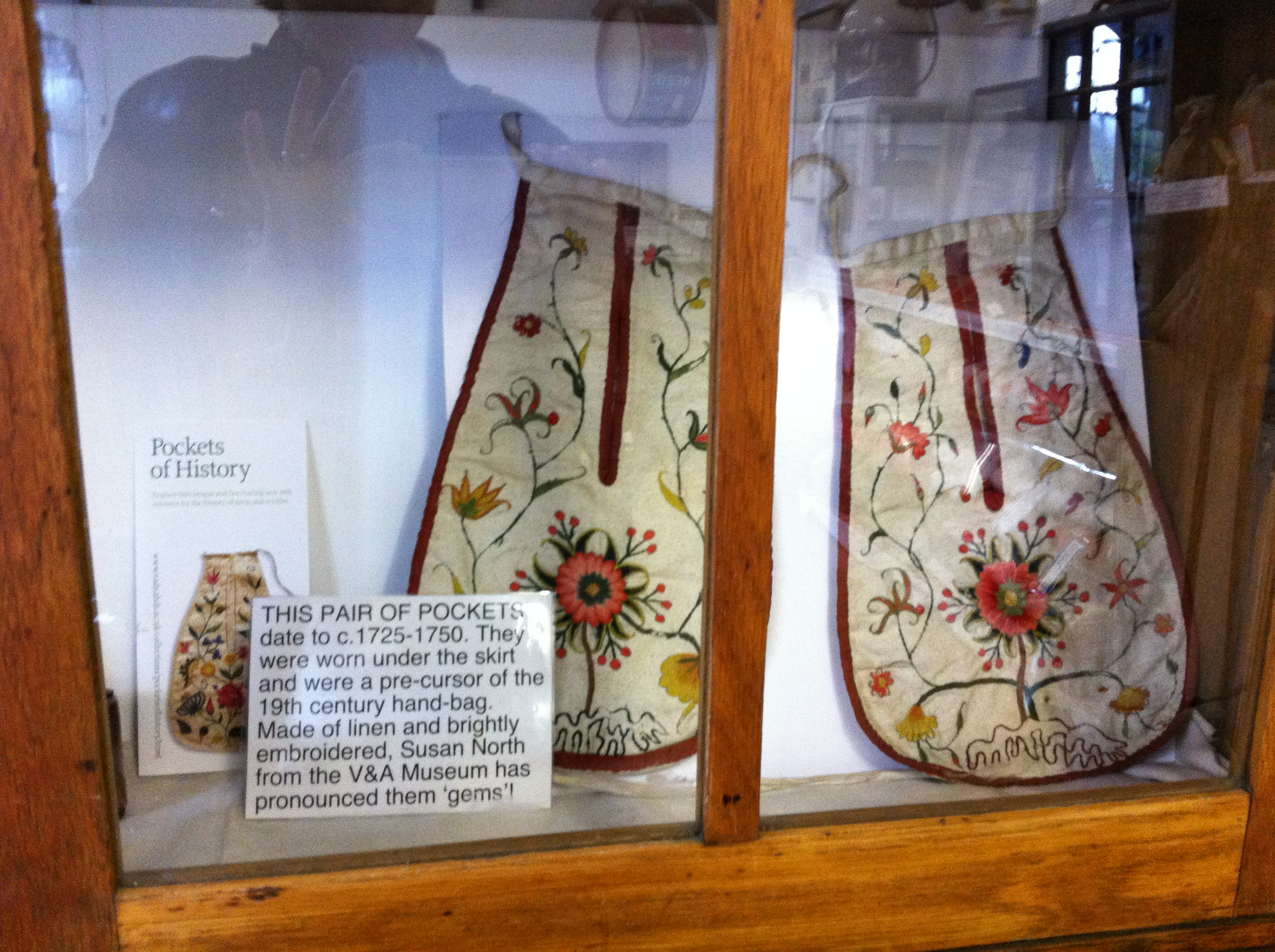
18th century-style hanging pockets

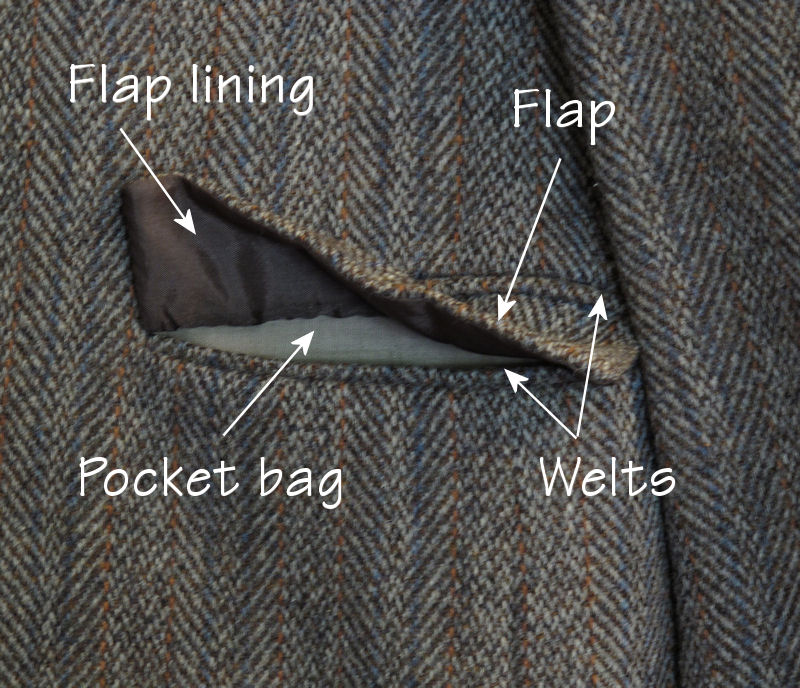
Parts of a tailored pocket

== See also ==
- Handbag
- Pocket square
- Reticule
- Wallet
