= Palazzo pants =

Women's pants with very full legs

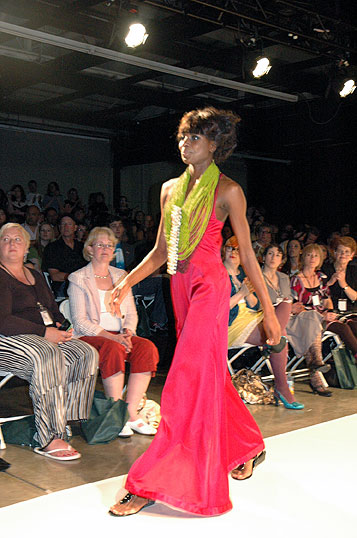
A model wearing palazzo-leg pants at the Art Institute of Portland (2009)

Palazzo pants (British English: palazzo trousers, Indian English: pantada) are long unisex pants cut with a loose, extremely wide leg that flares out from the waist.

== Style ==
Palazzo pants are popular as a summer season style, as they are loose and tend to be flattering in light, flowing fabrics that are breathable in hot weather. Silk crepe/crape, jersey, and other natural fiber textiles are popular fabrics for this design, especially when worn in warmer weather.

Although less popular during the cooler winter months, palazzo pants are also made using wool or heavy synthetic fabrics.

Palazzo pants flare out evenly from the waist to the ankle, and are therefore different from bell-bottoms, which are snug until they flare out from the knee.

=== Similar designs ===
Palazzo pants should not be confused with gaucho trousers, which only extend down to mid-calf length.

Harem pants are a similar loose style that was popular in the 1980s, but they have a snug cuff around the ankles.

== History ==
In the 1930s and 1940s, some women fond of avant-garde fashions, such as the actresses Katharine Hepburn, Greta Garbo, and Marlene Dietrich, popularized a style of wide-legged cuffed pants known then primarily as "Oxford bags".

In the late 1960s and early 1970s, "palazzo pants", an updated version of the Oxford bag style, first became a popular trend for women.

During the 1960s, some upscale restaurants resisted modern fashion trends by refusing to admit women wearing pants of any kind, which were considered inappropriate by some proprietors. This posed a problem for women who did not want to wear the skirt styles that were then in fashion. Some women opted to circumvent restaurant bans on women in pants by wearing palazzo pants or culottes as evening wear, which had just enough of a skirt-like appearance to skate by the restrictions.

== See also ==
- Culottes
- Oxford bags
