= Patricia Giggans =

American feminist activist

Patricia Occhiuzzo Giggans (born October 25, 1944), also known as Patti Giggans, is a Los Angeles–based feminist activist and advocate for supporting victims of domestic violence. She serves as the executive director of Peace Over Violence, and as of 2024 has worked there for over forty years.

== Career ==
Giggans received her bachelor's degree in psychology from the State University of NY at Buffalo and her master's degree in Nonprofit Administration from the University of San Francisco. Giggans has studied karate extensively and achieved a black belt and certification as a Master Self-Defense Trainer. In 1976, she founded Karate Woman, the first women's martial arts school in Southern California.

Since 1985, she has been the executive director of Peace Over Violence, a nonprofit agency that functions as a sexual, domestic and interpersonal violence prevention center providing crisis intervention and support for healing from violence. The organization was founded in 1971 and was formerly known as Los Angeles Commission on Assaults Against Women, or LACAAW.

In 1999, Giggans initiated Denim Day in LA, which has since grown to be a national rape prevention and education campaign to combat sexual violence and support its victims. The campaign began after a 1998 ruling by the Italian Supreme Court where a rape conviction was overturned because the justices felt that, due to the fact that the victim wore very tight jeans, she must have assisted the perpetrator and helped him remove them, thus the act was consensual.

Women in the Italian Parliament protested by wearing jeans on the steps of the Italian Supreme Court. The protest was picked up by international media and inspired Giggans, who felt that, "everyone should be wearing jeans to protest all of the myths about why women are raped." Peace Over Violence has organized Denim Day every April since 1999 in honor of Sexual Assault Awareness Month.

On November 24, 2016, Sheila Kuehl appointed Giggans to the Los Angeles County Sheriff Civilian Oversight Commission, which works to boost transparency and increase trust between communities and the Sheriff's Department. She served on the Family Assistance and Communication and the Mental Evaluation Team Program Ad Hoc Committees. Giggans was elected chairperson of the commission in 2018.

Giggans is a Founding Board Member of the California Partnership to End Domestic Violence and is past President of the California Coalition Against Sexual Assault. Giggans has received the California Peace Prize, a Durfee Foundation Stanton Fellow and is a recipient of the Lifetime Achievement Award from the California Partnership to End Domestic Violence (CPEDV).

== Writing ==
Giggans has co-authored In Touch With Teens, Women’s Self-Defense and Safety: An Empowerment and Resiliency Model and When Dating Becomes Dangerous: A Parent’s Guide to Preventing Relationship Abuse, as well as 50 Ways to A Safer World and What Parents Need to Know About Teen Dating Violence.

== Personal life ==
Giggans married her partner Ellen Ledley in a ceremony officiated by then California state senator Sheila Kuehl on March 8, 2004.
