= Denim Day =

Annual sexual assault awareness day

Denim Day is an annual day to promote awareness of sexual assault and solidarity with victims. It was founded in Italy in the 1990s around a rape case where the verdict was overturned in favor of the accused due to the victim wearing tight jeans; and therefore the idea of consent was put to question. Outraged, the women of the Italian parliament wore denim as an act of solidarity.

Later, Los Angeles, California (inspired by events in Italy), and now acknowledged in several places worldwide, takes place on the last Wednesday of April, which is Sexual Assault Awareness Month. This day of action and awareness is an event in which people are encouraged to wear denim to combat victim blaming and educate others about sexual violence. The day comes following a high profile Italian rape trial where the survivor was blamed for her rape because of the type of jeans she was wearing. In protest and solidarity, individuals are encouraged to wear denim to combat the idea that rape and sexual violence are the fault or responsibility of survivors. The ruling was overturned in 2008.

== Background ==
In 1992 in Muro Lucano, Italy, an 18 year old woman came forward after experiencing sexual violence following her first driving lesson. She recounted how the driving instructor, a 45-year-old man, drove her to an isolated area, forced her to get out of the vehicle, forcibly removed one leg of her jeans, enacted sexual violence and raped her, then told her that if she was to tell anyone he would kill her. Immediately following the incident the girl alerted her parents and the police.

The rapist was convicted and sentenced to a lesser charge of indecent exposure. The survivor appealed the sentence resulting in a subsequent conviction on all charges. The (then) convicted rapist appealed to the Supreme Court of Cassation, which overturned the conviction in a 1998 decision that indicated since the survivors' jeans were very tight she must have participated in the rape. The "jeans alibi" was used to argue that since the jeans were so tight, the only way to have gotten them off was if the survivor aided her attacker in removing her jeans, thus making the act consensual. The court stated in its decision "it is a fact of common experience that it is nearly impossible to slip off tight jeans even partly without the active collaboration of the person who is wearing them." In 2008 the Supreme Court of Cassation overturned the ruling, so there is no longer a "denim" defense to the charge of rape.

== Reaction ==
The indication that women's choice of jeans or clothing is indicative of consent sparked widespread outrage and protest starting with Italian government officials. The day after the decision, members of the Italian Parliament protested by wearing jeans and holding placards that read "Jeans: An Alibi for Rape", no male members of the Italian Parliament participated. The female parliamentary members that organized the protest belonged to the Polo della Libertà, a political coalition headed by Silvio Berlusconi. Among the most vocal and active critics of the sentence were Alessandra Mussolini, Stefania Prestigiacomo and Cristina Matranga.

As a sign of solidarity and support, the California State Legislature followed suit.

Inspired by these events, Patricia Giggans, Executive Director of Peace Over Violence (formerly the Los Angeles Commission on Assaults Against Women), established Denim Day in Los Angeles in 1999. It has since become an annual, international event, involving over 12 million people around the world, according to Peace Over Violence. As of 2011, at least 20 U.S. states officially recognize Denim Day in April.

Wearing jeans on this day has become an international symbol of protest against such attitudes about sexual assault.

== Sources ==
- Maher, Sean. "Denim Day brings big push for sexual assault awareness ", InsideBayArea.com. 23 Apr. 2009. Bay Area News Group. 26 Apr. 2009
- Denim Day Attempts Prevention and Awareness, Valley Star - Apr 29, 2009
- SAFE in Hunterdon's Denim Day, New Jersey Monthly - Apr 26, 2009.
- The Herald (Glasgow) archived.
- The Los Angeles Times archived.
- Alessandra Stanley, New York Times Feb 16, 1999 "Ruling on tight Jeans and Rape Sets off Anger in Italy"
