= The Pudding =

Online data journalism publisher

The Pudding is a digital publisher which produces data journalism for storytelling. Articles in the publication are visual essays which emphasize data visualizations and use fewer words than conventional journalism.

The publication does not have central editorial planning, and instead invites its journalists to publish according to their interests and expertise.

The organization was founded in 2017 and as of January 2021 had 8 full time journalists on staff.

The organization won a Peabody Award in 2017 and an Online Journalism Award in 2023.
