= Theon =

Theon may refer to:

== People with the name ==
=== Given name or stage name ===
- Theon (1st century BC), literary critic and lexicographer
- Theon (rhetorician) (c. 500), teacher of Damascius
- Theon, vocalist for Lovex
- Theon of Alexandria (c. 335 – c. 405), a Greek astronomer and mathematician
- Theon of Samos, painter
- Theon of Smyrna (c. 70 – c. 135), philosopher and mathematician

=== Surname ===
- Aelius Theon (mid to late first century A.D.), teacher of rhetorics
- Alma Théon (1843–1908), clairvoyant and occultist
- Max Théon (1848–1927), kabbalist and occultist

=== Fictional ===
- Theon Greyjoy, character in A Song of Ice and Fire

== Places ==
- Theon, Washington, a community in the United States
- Theon, Texas, an unincorporated town in Texas
- Theon Junior (crater), a lunar impact crater
- Theon Senior (crater), a lunar impact crater

== Other ==
- Theon Design, a custom Porsche workshop

== See also ==
- Theion (disambiguation)
- Then (disambiguation)
- Thien (disambiguation)
- Thiên (disambiguation)
- Thoen (name)
- Thone (disambiguation)
- Toen (disambiguation)
