= Thon (name) =

Thon is a given name and a surname.

== Given name ==
- Thon Maker (born 1997), Australian basketballer
- Thon Moreira or Thon Thomas, nicknames of Hilton Moreira (born 1981), Brazilian footballer

== Surname ==
- Bjørn Erik Thon (born 1964), Norwegian jurist and ombudsman
- Dickie Thon (born 1958), American baseball player
- Harald Thon (1954–2019), Norwegian orienteer
- Jørgen Olsen Thon (1866–1937), Norwegian politician
- Konstantin Thon (1794–1881), Russian architect
- Lisa Thon, Puerto Rican fashion designer
- Melanie Rae Thon (born 1957), American writer
- Nikolaos Thon (1850–1906), Greek businessman
- Olaf Thon (born 1966), German footballer
- Olav Thon (1923–2024), Norwegian businessman
- Øyvin Thon (born 1958), Norwegian orienteering competitor
- Ozjasz Thon (1870–1936), Polish rabbi
- Sixtus Armin Thon (1817–1901), German artist
- Theodor Thon (1792–1838), German naturalist, engraver and inventor
- Wai Hnin Pwint Thon (born 1989), Burmese activist based in London
- William Thon (1906–2000), American painter
- William G. Thon (1886–1953), American lawyer and politician

== See also ==
- Than (disambiguation)
- Thaon (surname)
- Thoen (name)
- Thom
- Thon (disambiguation)
- Thony (name)
- Thorn (surname)
- Thun (disambiguation)
- Ton (given name)
- Toon (name)
