= February 19 =

February 19 this year in various calendars
- Thursday, 19 February 2026
Akan	Kuruyaw
Armenian	4 Areg 1475
Aztec	Etzalcualiztli 20, 2 Tōchtli
Babylonian	1 Shabatu, 2336 SE
Balinese pawukon	Luang, Pepet, Pasah, Menala, Paing, Paniron, Wraspati of Parangbakat, Yama, Dangu, Raja
Bengali	6 Falgun, BS 1432
Chinese	Yang Wood Rat・Legs Mansion; Fire Horse Year, Month 1, Day 3 (Yushui, 14 days until Jingzhe)
Common Era	19 February 2026 CE
Coptic	12 Meshir, AM 1742
Egyptian	9 Epiphi, 2774 NE
Ethiopian	12 Yakātit, 2018 Amätä Məhrät
French Republican	Décade I, Primidi de Ventôse de l'Année 234 de la République
Gregorian	19 February, AD 2026
Hebrew	2 Adar, AM 5786
Hindu	Pūrvabhādrapada・Siddha; Solar: 7 Phālguna, 1947 SE; Lunisolar: Dvitīyā, Śukla pakṣa of Phālguna, 2082 VE; Rāudra・5126 KY・1,872,625
Icelandic	Fimmtudagur, 28 Þorri 2025
Islamic	2 Ramadan, AH 1447 (using tabular method)
ISO week date	2026-W08-4
Japanese	3 Mutsuki, Reiwa 8 (Usui, 14 days until Keichitsu)
Julian	6 February, AD 2026 (AM 7534)
Julian day	2461091
Korean	3 Horangidal, 4359 DE
Maya	13.0.13.6.8; 6 Kayab, 2 Lamat
Roman	ante diem VIII Idus Februarias, MMDCCLXXIX AUC
Solar Hijri	30 Bahman, SH 1404
Tibetan	2 mchu, me pho rta 2153 or 1772 or 1000

<<	February					>>
Su	Mo	Tu	We	Th	Fr	Sa
1	2	3	4	5	6	7
8	9	10	11	12	13	14
15	16	17	18	19	20	21
22	23	24	25	26	27	28
2026

February 19 in recent years
2026 (Thursday)
2025 (Wednesday)
2024 (Monday)
2023 (Sunday)
2022 (Saturday)
2021 (Friday)
2020 (Wednesday)
2019 (Tuesday)
2018 (Monday)
2017 (Sunday)

February 19 is the 50th day of the year in the Gregorian calendar; 315 days remain until the end of the year (316 in leap years).

== Events ==
=== Pre-1600 ===
- 197 – Emperor Septimius Severus defeats usurper Clodius Albinus in the Battle of Lugdunum, the bloodiest battle between Roman armies.
- 356 – The anti-paganism policy of Constantius II forbids the worship of pagan idols in the Roman Empire.
- 607 – Pope Boniface III is consecrated in Rome.
- 1594 – Having already been elected to the throne of the Polish–Lithuanian Commonwealth in 1587, Sigismund III of the House of Vasa is crowned King of Sweden, having succeeded his father John III of Sweden in 1592.
- 1600 – The Peruvian stratovolcano Huaynaputina explodes in the most violent eruption in the recorded history of South America.

=== 1601–1900 ===
- 1649 – The Second Battle of Guararapes takes place, effectively ending Dutch colonization efforts in Brazil.
- 1674 – England and the Netherlands sign the Treaty of Westminster, ending the Third Anglo-Dutch War. A provision of the agreement transfers the Dutch colony of New Amsterdam to England.
- 1714 – Great Northern War: The battle of Napue between Sweden and Russia is fought in Isokyrö, Ostrobothnia.
- 1726 – The Supreme Privy Council is established in Russia.
- 1807 – Former Vice President of the United States Aaron Burr is arrested for treason in Wakefield, Alabama, and confined to Fort Stoddert.
- 1819 – British explorer William Smith discovers the South Shetland Islands.
- 1836 – King William IV signs Letters Patent establishing the province of South Australia.
- 1846 – In Austin, Texas, the newly formed Texas state government is officially installed. The Republic of Texas government officially transfers power to the State of Texas government following the annexation of Texas by the United States.
- 1847 – The first group of rescuers reaches the Donner Party.
- 1878 – Thomas Edison patents the phonograph.
- 1884 – More than sixty tornadoes strike the Southern United States, one of the largest tornado outbreaks in U.S. history.

=== 1901–present ===
- 1913 – Pedro Lascuráin becomes President of Mexico for 45 minutes; this is the shortest term to date of any person as president of any country.
- 1915 – World War I: The first naval attack on the Dardanelles begins when a strong Anglo-French task force bombards Ottoman artillery along the coast of Gallipoli.
- 1937 – Yekatit 12: During a public ceremony at the Viceregal Palace (the former Imperial residence) in Addis Ababa, Ethiopia, two Ethiopian nationalists of Eritrean origin attempt to kill viceroy Rodolfo Graziani with a number of grenades.
- 1942 – World War II: Nearly 250 Japanese warplanes attack the northern Australian city of Darwin, killing 243 people.
- 1942 – World War II: United States President Franklin D. Roosevelt signs executive order 9066, allowing the United States military to relocate Japanese Americans to internment camps.
- 1943 – World War II: Battle of Kasserine Pass in Tunisia begins.
- 1945 – World War II: Battle of Iwo Jima: About 30,000 United States Marines land on the island of Iwo Jima.
- 1948 – The Conference of Youth and Students of Southeast Asia Fighting for Freedom and Independence convenes in Calcutta.
- 1949 – Ezra Pound is awarded the first Bollingen Prize in poetry by the Bollingen Foundation and Yale University.
- 1954 – Transfer of Crimea: The Soviet Politburo of the Soviet Union orders the transfer of the Crimean Oblast from the Russian SFSR to the Ukrainian SSR.
- 1959 – The United Kingdom grants Cyprus independence, which is formally proclaimed on August 16, 1960.
- 1960 – China successfully launches the T-7, its first sounding rocket.
- 1963 – The publication of Betty Friedan's The Feminine Mystique reawakens the feminist movement in the United States as women's organizations and consciousness raising groups spread.
- 1965 – Colonel Phạm Ngọc Thảo of the Army of the Republic of Vietnam, and a communist spy of the North Vietnamese Viet Minh, along with Generals Lâm Văn Phát and Trần Thiện Khiêm, all Catholics, attempt a coup against the military junta of the Buddhist Nguyễn Khánh.
- 1976 – Executive Order 9066, which led to the relocation of Japanese Americans to internment camps, is rescinded by President Gerald Ford's Proclamation 4417.
- 1978 – Egyptian forces raid Larnaca International Airport in an attempt to intervene in a hijacking, without authorisation from the Republic of Cyprus authorities. The Cypriot National Guard and Police forces kill 15 Egyptian commandos and destroy the Egyptian C-130 transport plane in open combat.
- 1985 – William J. Schroeder becomes the first recipient of an artificial heart to leave the hospital.
- 1985 – A Boeing 727 operating as Iberia Flight 610 crashes Mount Oiz in Spain, killing 148; it is the deadliest accident to occur in Iberia's history and the deadliest to occur in Basque County.
- 1985 – China Airlines Flight 006 experiences an aircraft upset over the Pacific Ocean, injuring 24.
- 1986 – Akkaraipattu massacre: the Sri Lankan Army massacres 80 Tamil farm workers in eastern Sri Lanka.
- 1988 – A Fairchild Swearingen Metroliner operating as AVAir Flight 3378 crashes in Cary, North Carolina, killing 12.
- 1989 – Flying Tiger Line Flight 066 crashes into a hill near Sultan Abdul Aziz Shah Airport in Malaysia, killing four.
- 2002 – NASA's Mars Odyssey space probe begins to map the surface of Mars using its thermal emission imaging system.
- 2003 – An Ilyushin Il-76 military aircraft crashes near Kerman, Iran, killing 275.
- 2006 – A methane explosion in a coal mine near Nueva Rosita, Mexico, kills 65 miners.
- 2011 – The debut exhibition of the Belitung shipwreck, containing the largest collection of Tang dynasty artifacts found in one location, begins in Singapore.
- 2012 – Forty-four people are killed in a prison brawl in Apodaca, Nuevo León, Mexico.
- 2020 – Nine people are killed in two domestic terrorist shootings in Hanau, Hesse, Germany.
- 2021 – Mya Thwe Thwe Khine, a 19-year-old protester, becomes the first known casualty of anti-coup protests that formed in response to the 2021 Myanmar coup d'état.
- 2026 – The 9th Congress of the Workers' Party of Korea officially opens in Pyongyang and lasts for 7 days. (from February 19th to February 25th, 2026)

== Births ==
=== Pre-1600 ===
- 1461 – Domenico Grimani, Italian cardinal (died 1523)
- 1473 – Nicolaus Copernicus, Prussian mathematician and astronomer (died 1543)
- 1497 – Matthäus Schwarz, German fashion writer (died 1574)
- 1519 – Froben Christoph of Zimmern, German author of the Zimmern Chronicle (died 1566)
- 1526 – Carolus Clusius, Flemish botanist and academic (died 1609)
- 1532 – Jean-Antoine de Baïf, French poet (died 1589)
- 1552 – Melchior Klesl, Austrian cardinal (died 1630)
- 1594 – Henry Frederick, Prince of Wales (died 1612)

=== 1601–1900 ===
- 1611 – Andries de Graeff, Dutch politician (died 1678)
- 1630 – Shivaji, Indian warrior-king and the founder of Maratha Empire (died 1680)
- 1660 – Friedrich Hoffmann, German physician and chemist (died 1742)
- 1717 – David Garrick, English actor, playwright, and producer (died 1779)
- 1743 – Luigi Boccherini, Italian cellist and composer (died 1805)
- 1798 – Allan MacNab, Canadian soldier, lawyer, and politician, Premier of Canada West (died 1862)
- 1800 – Émilie Gamelin, Canadian nun and social worker, founded the Sisters of Providence (died 1851)
- 1804 – Carl von Rokitansky, German physician, pathologist, and philosopher (died 1878)
- 1821 – August Schleicher, German linguist and academic (died 1868)
- 1833 – Élie Ducommun, Swiss journalist and activist, Nobel Prize laureate (died 1906)
- 1838 – Lydia Thompson, British burlesque performer (died 1908)
- 1841 – Elfrida Andrée, Swedish organist, composer, and conductor (died 1929)
- 1855 – Nishinoumi Kajirō I, Japanese sumo wrestler, the 16th Yokozuna (died 1908)
- 1859 – Svante Arrhenius, Swedish physicist and chemist, Nobel Prize laureate (died 1927)
- 1865 – Sven Hedin, Swedish geographer and explorer (died 1952)
- 1869 – Hovhannes Tumanyan, Armenian-Russian poet and author (died 1923)
- 1872 – Johan Pitka, Estonian admiral (died 1944)
- 1876 – Constantin Brâncuși, Romanian-French sculptor, painter, and photographer (died 1957)
- 1877 – Gabriele Münter, German painter (died 1962)
- 1878 – Harriet Bosse, Swedish–Norwegian actress (died 1961)
- 1880 – Álvaro Obregón, Mexican general and politician, 39th President of Mexico (died 1928)
- 1886 – José Abad Santos, Filipino lawyer and jurist, 5th Chief Justice of the Supreme Court of the Philippines (died 1942)
- 1888 – José Eustasio Rivera, Colombian lawyer and poet (died 1928)
- 1893 – Cedric Hardwicke, English actor and director (died 1964)
- 1895 – Louis Calhern, American actor (died 1956)
- 1896 – André Breton, French poet and author (died 1966)
- 1897 – Alma Rubens, American actress (died 1931)
- 1899 – Lucio Fontana, Argentinian-Italian painter and sculptor (died 1968)

=== 1901–present ===
- 1902 – Kay Boyle, American novelist, short story writer, and educator (died 1992)
- 1904 – Havank, Dutch journalist and author (died 1964)
- 1911 – Merle Oberon, Indian-American actress (died 1979)
- 1912 – Saul Chaplin, American composer (died 1997)
- 1912 – Dorothy Janis, American actress (died 2010)
- 1913 – Prince Pedro Gastão of Orléans-Braganza (died 2007)
- 1913 – Frank Tashlin, American animator and screenwriter (died 1972)
- 1914 – Thelma Kench, New Zealand Olympic sprinter (died 1985)
- 1915 – Dick Emery, English actor and comedian (died 1983)
- 1915 – John Freeman, English lawyer, politician, and diplomat, British Ambassador to the United States (died 2014)
- 1916 – Eddie Arcaro, American jockey and sportscaster (died 1997)
- 1917 – Carson McCullers, American novelist, short story writer, playwright, and essayist (died 1967)
- 1918 – Fay McKenzie, American actress (died 2019)
- 1920 – C. Z. Guest, American actress, fashion designer, and author (died 2003)
- 1920 – Jaan Kross, Estonian author and poet (died 2007)
- 1920 – George Rose, English actor and singer (died 1988)
- 1922 – Władysław Bartoszewski, Polish journalist and politician, Polish Minister of Foreign Affairs (died 2015)
- 1924 – David Bronstein, Ukrainian chess player and theoretician (died 2006)
- 1924 – Lee Marvin, American actor (died 1987)
- 1926 – György Kurtág, Hungarian composer and academic
- 1927 – Philippe Boiry, French journalist (died 2014)
- 1929 – Jacques Deray, French director and screenwriter (died 2003)
- 1930 – John Frankenheimer, American director and producer (died 2002)
- 1930 – K. Viswanath, Indian actor, director, and screenwriter (died 2023)
- 1932 – Joseph P. Kerwin, American captain, physician, and astronaut
- 1935 – Chung-Yun Hse, Taiwanese-American wood scientist (died 2021)
- 1935 – Dave Niehaus, American sportscaster (died 2010)
- 1935 – Russ Nixon, American MLB catcher and coach (died 2016)
- 1936 – Sam Myers, American singer-songwriter (died 2006)
- 1936 – Frederick Seidel, American poet
- 1937 – Terry Carr, American author and educator (died 1987)
- 1937 – Norm O'Neill, Australian cricketer and sportscaster (died 2008)
- 1938 – Choekyi Gyaltsen, 10th Panchen Lama (died 1989)
- 1939 – Erin Pizzey, English activist and author, founded Refuge
- 1940 – Saparmyrat Nyýazow, Turkmen engineer and politician, 1st President of Turkmenistan (died 2006)
- 1940 – Smokey Robinson, American singer-songwriter and producer
- 1940 – Bobby Rogers, American singer-songwriter (died 2013)
- 1941 – David Gross, American physicist and academic, Nobel Prize laureate
- 1941 – Jenny Tonge, Baroness Tonge, English politician
- 1942 – Cyrus Chothia, English biochemist and emeritus scientist at the Laboratory of Molecular Biology (died 2019)
- 1942 – Paul Krause, American football player and politician
- 1942 – Will Provine, American biologist, historian, and academic (died 2015)
- 1942 – Howard Stringer, Welsh businessman
- 1943 – Lou Christie, American singer-songwriter (died 2025)
- 1943 – Homer Hickam, American author and engineer
- 1943 – Tim Hunt, English biochemist and academic, Nobel laureate
- 1944 – Les Hinton, English-American journalist and businessman
- 1945 – Yuri Antonov, Uzbek-Russian singer-songwriter
- 1946 – Paul Dean, Canadian guitarist
- 1946 – Peter Hudson, Australian footballer and coach
- 1946 – Karen Silkwood, American technician and activist (died 1974)
- 1947 – Jackie Curtis, American actress and playwright (died 1985)
- 1947 – Tim Shadbolt, New Zealand businessman and politician, 42nd Mayor of Invercargill
- 1948 – Mark Andes, American singer-songwriter and bass player
- 1948 – Pim Fortuyn, Dutch sociologist, academic, and politician (died 2002)
- 1948 – Raúl Grijalva, United States representative from Arizona (died 2025)
- 1948 – Tony Iommi, English guitarist and songwriter
- 1949 – Danielle Bunten Berry, American game designer and programmer (died 1998)
- 1949 – Eddie Hardin, English singer-songwriter and pianist (died 2015)
- 1949 – Barry Lloyd, English footballer and manager (died 2024)
- 1949 – William Messner-Loebs, American author and illustrator
- 1950 – Juice Leskinen, Finnish singer-songwriter (died 2006)
- 1950 – Andy Powell, English singer-songwriter and guitarist
- 1951 – Muhammad Tahir-ul-Qadri, Pakistani scholar and politician, founder of Minhaj-ul-Quran
- 1952 – Ryū Murakami, Japanese novelist and filmmaker (died 2026)
- 1952 – Rodolfo Neri Vela, Mexican engineer and astronaut
- 1952 – Amy Tan, American novelist, essayist, and short story writer
- 1952 – Danilo Türk, Slovene academic and politician, 3rd President of Slovenia
- 1953 – Corrado Barazzutti, Italian tennis player
- 1953 – Cristina Fernández de Kirchner, Argentine lawyer and politician, President of Argentina and Vice President of Argentina
- 1953 – Massimo Troisi, Italian actor, director, and screenwriter (died 1994)
- 1954 – Francis Buchholz, German bass player (died 2026)
- 1954 – Michael Gira, American singer-songwriter, guitarist, and producer
- 1954 – Sócrates, Brazilian footballer and manager (died 2011)
- 1955 – Jeff Daniels, American actor and playwright
- 1956 – Peter Holsapple, American singer-songwriter and guitarist
- 1956 – Roderick MacKinnon, American biologist and academic, Nobel Prize laureate
- 1956 – Dave Wakeling, English singer-songwriter and guitarist
- 1957 – Falco, Austrian singer-songwriter, rapper, and musician (died 1998)
- 1957 – Dave Stewart, American baseball player, coach, and executive
- 1957 – Ray Winstone, English actor
- 1958 – Leslie David Baker, American actor
- 1958 – Helen Fielding, English author and screenwriter
- 1958 – Steve Nieve, English keyboard player and composer
- 1959 – Roger Goodell, American businessman, 6th National Football League Commissioner
- 1960 – Andrew Mountbatten-Windsor, second son of Elizabeth II
- 1960 – John Paul Jr., American race car driver (died 2020)
- 1961 – Justin Fashanu, English footballer (died 1998)
- 1961 – Ernie Gonzalez, American golfer (died 2020)
- 1962 – Hana Mandlíková, Czech-Australian tennis player and coach
- 1963 – Seal, English singer-songwriter
- 1963 – Jessica Tuck, American actress
- 1964 – Doug Aldrich, American singer-songwriter and guitarist
- 1964 – Jennifer Doudna, American biochemist
- 1964 – Jonathan Lethem, American novelist, essayist, and short story writer
- 1965 – Jon Fishman, American drummer
- 1965 – Clark Hunt, American businessman
- 1965 – Leroy, American singer-songwriter, guitarist, and producer
- 1966 – Justine Bateman, American actress and producer
- 1966 – Paul Haarhuis, Dutch tennis player and coach
- 1966 – Eduardo Xol, American designer and author (died 2024)
- 1967 – Benicio del Toro, Puerto Rican actor, director, and producer
- 1968 – Prince Markie Dee, American rapper and actor (died 2021)
- 1968 – Frank Watkins, American bass player (died 2015)
- 1969 – Burton C. Bell, American singer-songwriter and guitarist
- 1969 – Helena Guergis, Canadian businesswoman and politician
- 1970 – Joacim Cans, Swedish singer-songwriter
- 1970 – Verena Nussbaum, Austrian politician
- 1970 – Bellamy Young, American actress
- 1971 – Miguel Batista, Dominican baseball player and poet
- 1971 – Richard Green, Australian golfer
- 1971 – Jeff Kinney, American author and illustrator
- 1972 – Francine Fournier, American wrestler and manager
- 1972 – Sunset Thomas, American pornographic actress
- 1973 – Eric Lange, American actor
- 1975 – Daniel Adair, Canadian drummer and producer
- 1975 – Daewon Song, South Korean-American skateboarder, co-founded Almost Skateboards
- 1977 – Ola Salo, Swedish singer-songwriter and keyboard player
- 1977 – Andrew Ross Sorkin, American journalist and author
- 1977 – Gianluca Zambrotta, Italian footballer and manager
- 1978 – Ben Gummer, English scholar and politician
- 1978 – Immortal Technique, Peruvian-American rapper
- 1979 – Steve Cherundolo, American soccer player and manager
- 1980 – Dwight Freeney, American football player
- 1980 – Ma Lin, Chinese table tennis player
- 1980 – Mike Miller, American basketball player
- 1981 – Beth Ditto, American singer
- 1981 – Shawn Spears, Canadian wrestler
- 1983 – Kotoōshū Katsunori, Bulgarian sumo wrestler
- 1983 – Mika Nakashima, Japanese singer and actress
- 1983 – Reynhard Sinaga, Indonesian sex offender
- 1983 – Ryan Whitney, American ice hockey player
- 1983 – Jawad Williams, American basketball player
- 1984 – Chris Richardson, American singer-songwriter
- 1985 – Haylie Duff, American actress and singer
- 1985 – Arielle Kebbel, American actress and model
- 1985 – Kosta Perović, Serbian basketball player
- 1986 – Kyle Chipchura, Canadian ice hockey player
- 1986 – Linus Klasen, Swedish ice hockey player
- 1986 – Marta, Brazilian footballer
- 1986 – Maria Mena, Norwegian singer-songwriter
- 1987 – Anna Cappellini, Italian ice dancer
- 1987 – Josh Reddick, American baseball player
- 1988 – Shawn Matthias, Canadian ice hockey player
- 1988 – Seth Morrison, American guitarist
- 1989 – Sone Aluko, English-Nigerian footballer
- 1991 – Trevor Bayne, American race car driver
- 1991 – Christoph Kramer, German footballer
- 1991 – Adreian Payne, American basketball player (died 2022)
- 1992 – Camille Kostek, American model
- 1992 – Cody Parkey, American football player
- 1993 – Mauro Icardi, Argentine footballer
- 1993 – Victoria Justice, American actress and singer
- 1994 – Tiina Trutsi, Estonian footballer
- 1995 – Nikola Jokić, Serbian basketball player
- 1996 – Mabel, British-Swedish singer
- 1996 – D. J. Wilson, American basketball player
- 1998 – Katharina Gerlach, German tennis player
- 1998 – Chappell Roan, American singer and songwriter
- 1998 – Jungwoo, South Korean singer
- 2001 – Lee Kang-in, South Korean footballer
- 2001 – David Mazouz, American actor
- 2004 – Millie Bobby Brown, English actress, model and producer

== Deaths ==
=== Pre-1600 ===
- 197 – Clodius Albinus, Roman usurper (born 150)
- 446 – Leontius of Trier, Bishop of Trier
- 1133 – Irene Doukaina, Byzantine wife of Alexios I Komnenos (born 1066)
- 1275 – Lal Shahbaz Qalandar, Sufi philosopher and poet (born 1177)
- 1300 – Munio of Zamora, General of the Dominican Order
- 1408 – Thomas Bardolf, 5th Baron Bardolf, English rebel
- 1414 – Thomas Arundel, Archbishop of Canterbury (born 1353)
- 1445 – Eleanor of Aragon, queen of Portugal (born 1402)
- 1491 – Enno I, Count of East Frisia, German noble (born 1460)
- 1553 – Erasmus Reinhold, German astronomer and mathematician (born 1511)

=== 1601–1900 ===
- 1602 – Philippe Emmanuel, Duke of Mercœur (born 1558)
- 1605 – Orazio Vecchi, Italian composer (born 1550)
- 1622 – Henry Savile, English scholar and politician (born 1549)
- 1672 – Charles Chauncy, English-American minister, theologian, and academic (born 1592)
- 1709 – Tokugawa Tsunayoshi, Japanese shōgun (born 1646)
- 1716 – Dorothe Engelbretsdatter, Norwegian author and poet (born 1634)
- 1785 – Mary, Countess of Harold, English aristocrat and philanthropist (born 1701)
- 1789 – Nicholas Van Dyke, American lawyer and politician, 7th Governor of Delaware (born 1738)
- 1799 – Jean-Charles de Borda, French mathematician, physicist, and sailor (born 1733)
- 1806 – Elizabeth Carter, English poet and translator (born 1717)
- 1837 – Georg Büchner, German-Swiss poet and playwright (born 1813)
- 1837 – Thomas Burgess, English bishop and philosopher (born 1756)
- 1887 – Multatuli, Dutch-German author and civil servant (born 1820)
- 1897 – Karl Weierstrass, German mathematician and academic (born 1815)

=== 1901–present ===
- 1915 – Gopal Krishna Gokhale, Indian philosopher and politician (born 1866)
- 1916 – Ernst Mach, Austrian-Czech physicist and philosopher (born 1838)
- 1927 – Robert Fuchs, Austrian composer and educator (born 1847)
- 1928 – George Howard Earle Jr., American lawyer and businessman (born 1856)
- 1936 – Billy Mitchell, American general and pilot (born 1879)
- 1945 – John Basilone, American sergeant, Medal of Honor recipient (born 1916)
- 1951 – André Gide, French novelist, essayist, and dramatist, Nobel Prize laureate (born 1869)
- 1952 – Knut Hamsun, Norwegian novelist, poet, and playwright, Nobel Prize laureate (born 1859)
- 1953 – Richard Rushall, British businessman (born 1864)
- 1957 – Maurice Garin, Italian-French cyclist (born 1871)
- 1959 – Willard Miller, American sailor, Medal of Honor recipient (born 1877)
- 1962 – Georgios Papanikolaou, Greek-American pathologist, invented the Pap smear (born 1883)
- 1969 – Madge Blake, American actress (born 1899)
- 1970 – Ralph Edward Flanders, US Senator from Vermont (born 1890)
- 1972 – John Grierson, Scottish director and producer (born 1898)
- 1972 – Lee Morgan, American trumpet player and composer (born 1938)
- 1973 – Joseph Szigeti, Hungarian violinist (born 1892)
- 1977 – Anthony Crosland, English author and politician, Secretary of State for Foreign and Commonwealth Affairs (born 1918)
- 1977 – Mike González, Cuban baseball player, coach, and manager (born 1890)
- 1980 – Bon Scott, Scottish-Australian singer-songwriter (born 1946)
- 1983 – Alice White, American actress (born 1904)
- 1988 – André Frédéric Cournand, French-American physician and physiologist, Nobel Prize laureate (born 1895)
- 1992 – Tojo Yamamoto, American wrestler and manager (born 1927)
- 1994 – Derek Jarman, English director and set designer (born 1942)
- 1996 – Charlie Finley, American businessman (born 1918)
- 1997 – Leo Rosten, Polish-American author and academic (born 1908)
- 1997 – Deng Xiaoping, Chinese politician, paramount leader and 1st Vice Premier of the People's Republic of China (born 1904)
- 1998 – Grandpa Jones, American singer-songwriter and banjo player (born 1913)
- 1999 – Mohammad Mohammad Sadeq al-Sadr, Iraqi cleric (born 1943)
- 2000 – Friedensreich Hundertwasser, Austrian-New Zealand painter and illustrator (born 1928)
- 2001 – Liza 'N' Eliaz, Belgian, transgender, hardcore DJ (born 1958)
- 2001 – Stanley Kramer, American director and producer (born 1913)
- 2001 – Charles Trenet, French singer-songwriter (born 1913)
- 2002 – Sylvia Rivera, American transgender LGBT activist (born 1951)
- 2003 – Johnny Paycheck, American singer-songwriter and guitarist (born 1938)
- 2007 – Janet Blair, American actress and singer (born 1921)
- 2007 – Celia Franca, English-Canadian dancer and director, founded the National Ballet of Canada (born 1921)
- 2008 – Yegor Letov, Russian singer-songwriter (born 1964)
- 2008 – Lydia Shum, Chinese-Hong Kong actress and singer (born 1945)
- 2009 – Kelly Groucutt, English singer and bass player (born 1945)
- 2011 – Ollie Matson, American sprinter and football player (born 1930)
- 2012 – Ruth Barcan Marcus, American philosopher and logician (born 1921)
- 2012 – Jaroslav Velinský, Czech author and songwriter (born 1932)
- 2012 – Vitaly Vorotnikov, Russian politician, 27th Prime Minister of Russia (born 1926)
- 2013 – Armen Alchian, American economist and academic (born 1914)
- 2013 – Park Chul-soo, South Korean director, producer, and screenwriter (born 1948)
- 2013 – Robert Coleman Richardson, American physicist and academic, Nobel Prize laureate (born 1937)
- 2013 – Donald Richie, American-Japanese author and critic (born 1924)
- 2013 – Eugene Whelan, Canadian farmer and politician, 22nd Canadian Minister of Agriculture (born 1924)
- 2014 – Kresten Bjerre, Danish footballer and manager (born 1946)
- 2014 – Dale Gardner, American captain and astronaut (born 1948)
- 2014 – Valeri Kubasov, Russian engineer and astronaut (born 1935)
- 2015 – Harold Johnson, American boxer (born 1928)
- 2015 – Nirad Mohapatra, Indian director, producer, and screenwriter (born 1947)
- 2015 – Harris Wittels, American actor, producer, and screenwriter (born 1984)
- 2016 – Umberto Eco, Italian novelist, literary critic, and philosopher (born 1932)
- 2016 – Harper Lee, American author (born 1926)
- 2016 – Chiaki Morosawa, Japanese anime screenwriter (born 1959)
- 2016 – Samuel Willenberg, Polish-Israeli sculptor and painter (born 1923)
- 2017 – Larry Coryell, American jazz guitarist (born 1943)
- 2019 – Karl Lagerfeld, German fashion designer (born 1933)
- 2020 – José Mojica Marins, Brazilian filmmaker, actor, composer, screenwriter, and television horror host (born 1936)
- 2020 – Pop Smoke, American rapper (born 1999)

== Holidays and observances ==
- Army Day (Mexico)
- Brâncuși Day (Romania)
- Christian feast day:
  - Barbatus of Benevento
  - Boniface of Brussels
  - Conrad of Piacenza
  - Blessed Elisabetta Picenardi
  - Lucy Yi Zhenmei (one of Martyrs of Guizhou)
  - February 19 (Eastern Orthodox liturgics)
- Commemoration of Vasil Levski (Bulgaria)
- Shivaji Jayanti (Maharashtra, India)
