= Than (disambiguation) =

Than is a grammatical particle of the English language.

Than may also refer to:

- Than, Gujarat, a town in Gujarat, India
- Than, Kandi Dholran, a village in Himachal Pradesh, India

== People with the name ==
- Carl von Than (1834-1908), Hungarian chemist
- Mór Than (1828-1899), Hungarian painter
- Than (politician), Burmese politician
- Than E (1908-2007), Burmese singer
- Than Sina, Cambodian politician elected to the National Assembly in 2003
- Ohn Than (born 1946), Burmese activist for democracy
- Than Htay, Burmese government minister and retired brigadier general
- Than Nyein (politician) (1937-2014), Burmese politician and doctor
- Than Shwe (born 1933), Burmese politician and general
- Than Tun (1923-2005): Burmese historian
- Dinh Van Than, Vanuatuan businessman and former politician
- Nguyễn Hải Thần (1878-1959), Vietnamese revolutionary and military leader

== See also ==
- Then (disambiguation)
- Thann (disambiguation)
- Thon (disambiguation)
