= Thaon (disambiguation) =

Thaon is a commune in the Calvados department in northwestern France. Thaon may also refer to

- Colomby-sur-Thaon, a former commune in the Calvados department in France
- Thaon-les-Vosges, a former commune in the Vosges department in France
  - ES Thaon, a French football club based in Thaon-les-Vosges
- Thaon (surname)
