= Thoen (name) =

Thoen is a surname. It is a Norwegian name from the Old Norse Tónni. It is a Dutch variant of the name Anton and Antonius.

- Ernest Thoen (1946 - 2011), American photographer
- Fridtjof Thoen (born 1961), Norwegian judoka
- Terje Thoen (1944 – 2008), Norwegian ice hockey player

== See also ==
- Thon (name)
- Theon (disambiguation)
- Thorn (surname)
- Thoe (disambiguation)
- Thoen (disambiguation)
- Thone (disambiguation)
- Thien (disambiguation)
- Thiên (disambiguation)
