= Mya Aye (activist) =

Burmese activist

- Born: March 10, 1966 (age 60); Burma
- Other name: Thuya
- Occupation: Activist
- Criminal penalty: 65 years
- Children: Wai Hnin Pwint Thon
- Parent: Maung Maung

Mya Aye (Burmese: မြအေး, IPA: [mja̰ ʔé]) is a Burmese activist and one of the leaders of the 8888 generation pro-democracy student activists in Burma (Myanmar). He was elected Politician of the Year 2006 by readers of the Burma Digest.

He led a petition campaign for the release of all political prisoners imprisoned by the Myanmar Military Junta, SPDC in order to silence their opposition. He took overall responsibilities after Min Ko Naing, Pyone Cho, Min Za Ya, Htay Kywe and Ko Ko Gyi were arrested.

== Background ==
Mya Aye is a leader of the 88 Generation Students Group led by Min Ko Naing. He was first arrested in 1989 and sentenced for 8 years imprisonment for his role as a student leader in 1988 uprising. He was released in 1996 and continued campaigning for democracy in Burma. He was arrested again 2007 with fellow student leaders and sentenced to 65 years and 6 months imprisonment. His daughter is Wai Hnin Pwint Thon, who has campaigned for democracy and the release of political prisoners in Burma.

== Background of the uprising ==
On 27 June 2006 - the 18th anniversary of the founding of the National League for Democracy - the leaders of the opposition movement were arrested. On 2 October the remaining 88 Generation Students' group started the first-ever public campaign against the SPDC and gathered signatures for a petition calling for the release of political prisoners, including Aung San Suu Kyi.

More than half a million people signed the petition. The signatures were later presented to the UN. Following this they organized a "White Expression" campaign and requested that people wear white clothes to protest against the SPDC. It was continued until the 44th birthday of Min Ko Naing on 18 October. On 29 October, they started a third campaign called the "Multi Religious Prayer Campaign" and requested that people again wear white clothing and hold candlelight vigils and prayers in temples, churches and mosques.

On 22 August 2007, a rare public protest over a sharp rise in fuel prices led to a wave of arrests by the Burmese junta. Those arrested included the senior leaders of the 88 Generation Students' group as well as members of other student and civil advocacy groups. Hundreds of demonstrators had taken to the streets to express their anger at the surprise increase in fuel prices. Natural gas prices have risen 500% and petrol and diesel prices have almost doubled, according to The Guardian. The rise has hit poor labourers particularly hard, swallowing up to half of their daily income.

== The 88 Generation Students' group involvement ==
The 88 Generation Students Group is an organisation synonymous with the long struggle for democracy in military-ruled Burma and take their name from the 1988 student-led uprising and People's Democracy Movement, which was eventually suppressed by the military. In a rare announcement in all state-run newspapers, the junta said that the dissidents were arrested for undermining the peace and security of the state, according to The Epoch Times.

Min Ko Naing, Ko Ko Gyi, Mya Aye, Pyone Cho, Jimmy and Yin Htun were among those from the 88 Generation Student group arrested. On 21 August 2007, 14 student leaders of the 88 Student Generation of Democracy were arrested.

The 14 members are Paw U Tun (also known as Min Ko Naing), Ko Ko Gyi, Pyone Cho (also known as Htay Win Aung), Min Zeyar, Mya Aye, Jimmy (Kyaw Min Yu), Zeya, Ant Bwe Kyaw, Kyaw Kyaw Htwe (Marki), Panneik Tun, Zaw Zaw Min, Thet Zaw, Nyan Lin Tun and Ko Yin Htun. They were arrested by security officials and members of the state-backed Union Solidarity and Development Association (USDA).

"Military intelligence and government intelligence seized their houses and searched their houses,” told another dissident, Htay Kywe, who escaped and fled to neighbouring Thailand. Despite the arrests, reports from Burma said that campaigners took to the streets again the following day to protest against the government’s recent increase in fuel prices.

No warrants were produced for the arrests and according to an article published in the state-run newspaper New Light of Myanmar, they will be charged under Law 5/96, which provides for up to 20 years in prison, for their involvement in “acts undermining the efforts to successfully carry out peaceful transfer of state power and facilitate the proceedings of the National Convention.” Following the arrests, members of the security forces allegedly searched the homes of the afore-mentioned individuals and confiscated documents and compact discs. Reports claimed that they were detained at Kyaikkasan Detention Centre before being transferred to the notorious Insein Prison outside Yangon where they were at risk of torture, including beatings and electric shocks.

== Release ==
Along Min Ko Naing, Nilar Thein, and many other 88 Generation activists, Mya Aye was released on 13 January 2012 as part of a mass presidential pardon for political prisoners.

== Political career ==
He had planned to run for a seat in 2015 elections from the National League for Democracy. But his name was omitted from the NLD’s candidate list.

=== Political imprisonment ===
On 1 February 2021, Mya Aye was arrested along with other state leaders and politicians by the Myanmar military during the 2021 Myanmar coup d'état.

On 1 February 2021, Aung San Suu Kyi, Win Myint and all NLD elected officials were detained by military along with fellow parliament members in Myanmar.

On 17 November 2022, Mya Aye was freed from prison.
