= Than =

English function word

Than is a grammatical particle analyzed as both a conjunction and a preposition in the English language. It introduces a comparison and is associated with comparatives and with words such as more, less, and fewer. Typically, it measures the force of an adjective or similar description between two predicates.

== Usage ==
=== Case of pronouns following than ===
According to the view of many English-language prescriptivists, including influential 18th-century grammarian Robert Lowth, than is exclusively a conjunction and therefore takes either nominative (or subjective) or oblique (or objective) pronouns, depending on context, rather than exclusively oblique pronouns as prepositions do. This rule is broken as often as it is observed. For instance, William Shakespeare's 1600 play Julius Caesar has an instance of an oblique pronoun following than where the nominative is also possible:

A man no mightier than thyself or me...

Likewise, Samuel Johnson wrote:

No man had ever more discernment than him, in finding out the ridiculous.

In simple comparisons in contemporary English, than often takes an oblique pronoun, which lexicographers and usage commentators regard as prepositional use and as standard.

The case of a pronoun following than can be determined by context. For example:

- You are a better swimmer than she.
  - The sentence is equivalent to "You are a better swimmer than she is."
- They like you more than her.
  - The sentence is equivalent to "They like you more than they like her."
  - The sentence "They like you more than she" may instead mean "They like you more than she likes you."

=== Confusion between than and then ===
In writing, than and then are often erroneously interchanged. In standard English, then refers to time or consequence, while than is used in comparisons.
