= Theion =

Theion may refer to

- θεῖον, Greek for "sulfur"
- θεῖον, Greek for "divine", see Theos (disambiguation)
