= Thou (disambiguation) =

Thou is an archaic second person singular pronoun in English.

Thou may also refer to:

- Thousandth(s) of an inch, a derived unit of length used in engineering and manufacturing
- Thousand
- Thou., a reference to French botanist Louis-Marie Aubert du Petit-Thouars

== Geography ==
- Le Thou, a commune of Charente-Maritime, France
- Thou, Cher, a commune of Cher, France
- Thou, Loiret, a commune of Loiret, France

== Music ==
- Thou (Belgian band), a Belgian rock band
- Thou (American band), an American sludge metal band

== People with the family name de Thou ==
- Jacques Auguste de Thou, French historian
- Christophe de Thou, French advocate
- Nicolas de Thou, French cleric, Bishop of Chartres

== See also ==
- Thon (disambiguation)
