= Killing of Mya Thwe Thwe Khine =

Burmese protester

This picture from her Facebook page is now used in posters and protest rallies

Mya Thwe Thwe Khine (Burmese: မြသွဲ့သွဲ့ခိုင်; February 11, 2001 – February 19, 2021; variously romanised as Mya Thwe Thwe Khaing or Mya Thwate Thwate Khaing) was a young Burmese woman who became the first known casualty of the 2021 Myanmar protests, which formed in the aftermath of the 2021 Myanmar coup d'état. Pro-democracy protesters and international groups alike have rallied around her shooting.

She has become a focal point for demonstrators, with her image often displayed by people resisting the coup. Her funeral on 21 February 2021 was attended by several thousand protesters.

== Shooting ==
On 9 February, 19-year-old Mya Thwe Thwe Khaing had joined a protest rally on Taungnyo Road, near the Thabyegon roundabout in the Burmese capital Naypyidaw. Riot police quelled the rally, injuring several protesters in the process. She was standing under a bus shelter, taking cover from water cannons, while she was shot. Mya had been wearing a motorcycle helmet at the time of the shooting. Recorded video from bystanders captured the exact moment she was shot in the head. Subsequent analysis of images from the protest conducted by Amnesty International showed police carrying Myanmar-made BA-94 or BA-93 clones of the Uzi sub-machine gun, contradicting the Myanmar military's statement that security forces had only deployed non-lethal weapons. Forensic analysis also indicated the shooting had occurred in the early afternoon, between noon and 1:30 pm.

Mya was admitted to Naypyidaw's 1,000-bed general hospital in critical condition. On the morning of 12 February, doctors unsuccessfully attempted to surgically dislodge the bullet from her head. Doctors declared her medically brain dead, due to the complete loss of brain function, and advised her family to remove ventilation. As of 14 February, her family had decided to take her off life support, but had not finalised the timing. Prayer services for Mya were held at the Mandalay University of Foreign Languages and Yangon City Hall on 14 February.

== Significance ==
Video of the shooting and a photo of an unconscious and blood-stained Mya were widely circulated on Burmese language social media, with supporters dubbing her a protest martyr. Citizens criticized and attacked two officers purportedly involved in the shooting on social media, although the identities of the shooters remain unconfirmed.

The violent use of force in Mya Thwe Thwe Khaing's shooting sparked national outrage, with celebrities and public figures such as Thandar Hlaing criticizing her treatment. Nyi Nyi Tun, the chair of the Myanmar Motion Picture Organisation, stated "We cannot witness any more Mya Thwe Thwe Khaings" and urged the public to join the civil disobedience movement. On 11 February, Mya's sister, Mya Thado Nwe, publicly addressed media outlets, and urged the public to "uproot the military dictatorship" for the sake of future generations.

Thomas Andrews, the United Nations Special Rapporteur on the situation of human rights in Myanmar, mentioned her on Twitter. On 11 February, UN Women expressed its condolences to Mya's family and called "on the military and police to refrain from using disproportionate force against demonstrators." On 12 February, Progressive Voice, a coalition of 177 local civil society organisations, published an open letter to the United Nations Security Council, and cited the shooting of Mya as an example of escalating violence by authorities against protesters.

On 17 February, a 15 m (49 feet) long billboard depicting Mya's shooting was unfurled off of a pedestrian bridge in Downtown Yangon. Protesters have also used her photos compared with ones of Win Maw Oo on protest signs, and given worldwide coverage such as huge crowds mourn woman killed in protests.

On 19 February, the hospital in the city confirmed her death at 11:00 local time (04:30 GMT). Her funeral was a major occasion attended by about 100,000 people.
