= Wai Hnin Pwint Thon =

Burmese activist based in London (born 1989)

- ဝေနှင်းပွင့်သုန်
- Wai Hnin Pwint Thon in 2021
- Born: 4 January 1989 (age 37); Rangoon, Myanmar
- Education: Birkbeck, University of London
- Occupation: Political Activist
- Parent(s): Mya Aye, Sandar Win
- Relatives: Wutyee Yanant

Wai Hnin Pwint Thon (Burmese: ဝေနှင်းပွင့်သုန်; born 4 January 1989) is a Burmese activist based in London. Wai Hnin was born in Rangoon, Burma (Myanmar) and is the daughter of Mya Aye, one of the leaders of the 88 Generation student group in Burma.

Throughout her life, Wai Hnin's father was imprisoned for political involvement, meeting him for the first time through bars. She left Burma in 2006 to study in London. Shortly after arriving in London, her father was arrested for taking part in events leading up to the "Saffron Revolution" in Burma and sentenced to 65.5 years in prison. Since that time Wai Hnin has sought to raise her father's detention and the plight of the more than 2,200 other political prisoners currently held in detention in Burma. Wai Hnin has worked for Burma Campaign UK and Amnesty International and has frequently appeared in British and international media. In 2010, after meeting Wai Hnin, former British Foreign Secretary, David Miliband, remarked that he was "struck first by her bravery and strength in leaving her family for a new life to study here in Britain, and secondly by her determination to bring about change in Burma." She has been studying Global politics and International Relations in Birkbeck, University of London since 2013 and in 2016, she obtained her bachelor's degree.

== See also ==
- Wai Hnin Pwint Thon's profile and articles on the Guardian
- Human rights in Burma
- Burma Campaign UK
- Amnesty International
