= Thum (disambiguation) =

Thum is a city in Saxony. Thum may also refer to:

- Thum, alternative name of Kreuzau in North Rhine-Westphalia
- Thum (title), Pakistan
- Thum (surname)
- Thüm., taxonomic author abbreviation of Felix von Thümen (1839–1892), German botanist and mycologist
