= Thun (disambiguation) =

Thun is a municipality in Switzerland.

Thun may also refer to:

- Thun 1794, a Czech porcelain manufacturer
- Thun District, Switzerland
- Thun (administrative district), in the Canton of Bern, Switzerland
- FC Thun, a Swiss football team from Thun
- Lake Thun, an Alpine lake in the Bernese Oberland in Switzerland
- Thun Castle, a Swiss heritage site in Thun

== People with the surname ==
- Thun und Hohenstein family
- Christian Thun (born 1992), German boxer
- Hang Thun Hak (1926–1975), Cambodian politician, academic and playwright
- Hedwig Thun (1892–1969), German painter and writer
- Heinrich Thun (1938–2024), Austrian athlete
- Inge Thun (1945−2008), Norwegian football goalkeeper
- Karl-Heinz Thun (1937–1993), German sailor
- Kjersti Thun (born 1974), Norwegian footballer
- Matteo Thun (born 1952), Italian architect and designer
- Michael Thun, American cancer researcher
- Rachel Blankenship (née Thun; born 1995), American soccer player
- Róża Thun (born 1954), Polish politician

=== Fictional character ===
- Prince Thun appeared in various forms of the Flash Gordon comic strip

== People with the given name ==
- Thun Sett (born 1991), Burmese actress and model
- Thun Sophea (born 1979) Cambodian kickboxer

== See also ==
- Thon (disambiguation)
- Thum (surname)
- Thumm
