= Death of Ko Par Gyi =

Assassinated Burmese journalist

Ko Par Gyi (Burmese: ကိုပါကြီး; 1965 – 4 October 2014); born Aung Kyaw Naing (အောင်ကျော်နိုင်), was a freelance journalist in Myanmar (Burma). Aung Kyaw Naing disappeared on 30 September 2014 while covering fighting between a band of ethnic Karen rebels and the Myanmar Army near the Myanmar-Thailand border. He was taken into custody by an army infantry battalion in eastern Mon State near Kyaikmaraw Township. He was shot dead on 4 October 2014 and his body was buried at Shwewar Chaung, a village outside of Kyaikmaraw. His family was not notified of the burial and the military did not publicly acknowledge his death until 23 October 2014.

== Background ==
Aung Kyaw Naing began his career as an activist during the anti-government demonstrations in 1988. He was also part of the Tri-Colour (Thone-Yaung-Chae) student organization and briefly served as a bodyguard for opposition leader Aung San Suu Kyi. To escape the regime's crackdown on activists and dissidents, he traveled to Mae Sot, a Thai-Myanmar border town where ethnic rebels, activists, and politicians often sought refuge. He was one of the many journalists that documented human-rights abuses committed by the military junta in Mae Sot, a district of Thailand on the Myanmar border.

On 7 November 2010, during 2010 Myanmar general election, 10,000 refugees fled Myanmar as fighting between Karen and Myanmar army forces broke out. Aung Kyaw Naing went to the area to help refugees and he also took photographs, beginning his career as a freelance photographer and journalist. As Myanmar's political reform progressed in 2012, Aung Kyaw Naing gathered information in conflict zones and sent photographs and news stories to be published in local papers in Yangon. His pen name was Aung Gyi. When the conflict between the Democratic Karen Benevolent Army (DKBA) and the Myanmar Army in Karen and Mon States intensified in September 2014, Aung Kyaw Naing traveled again to the conflict zone. His work appeared in many local media outlets such as The Voice, Eleven Media and Yangon Times.

== Killing ==
After his death, Myanmar Army claimed that the reporter was a communications officer for the political wing of the Democratic Karen Benevolent Army's (DKBA). Nineteen days after his death, the army sent an unsigned email to Myanmar's Interim Press Council saying he was shot while trying to escape. Human rights groups have said that he was probably killed for reporting openly on the military. Myanmar National Human Rights Commission, under the command of then-president Thein Sein, opened an investigation on this incident. The DKBA denied that Aung Kyaw Naing was working for them and activists and fellow journalists have also dismissed the army's version of events. His body was exhumed on 5 November 2014 showing that the journalist was shot five times and that his body showed signs of torture including a broken jaw, a caved-in skull, several teeth missing, broken arms and swelling on the torso indicating broken ribs. “The only way I could tell that it was my husband was because of his height," said Naing's wife.

== Military trial ==
Myanmar National Human Rights Commission (MNHRC) recommended that Aung Kyaw Naing's case be heard in military court. The military overruled this recommendation, and were put on trial behind closed doors. The two men were acquitted November 2015. The public learned of their release several months after it occurred, calling into question the legitimacy of the trial and verdict. The release announcement stated that the officers had been acquitted under Section 71 of the Defense Service Act and Section 304 of the Criminal Code of Procedure, which respectively discipline civil offenses. The verdict was approved by the commander of the Southeast Command and the Defence Ministry stated that the actions taken against the officers had complied with the 2008 Constitution, the Code of Criminal Procedures, and the military act. The MNHRC recommended the case to be tried again in a civilian court in the interests of transparency.

== Civilian trial ==
The case was then heard in a civilian court in Kyaikmaraw Township from April to June 2015. At trial, the court heard the testimony of a motorcyclist who was the last person to speak to the journalist before he was arrested. He testified that soldiers stopped both him and Aung Kyaw Naing, as they passed a monastery. Minutes after his arrest a military truck came and took the journalist away.

The Kyaikmaraw Township Court ruled that the journalist had been murdered. As a civilian court it said it did not have jurisdiction over crimes committed by members of the military. After the verdict, Naing's wife Ma Thandar and her lawyer Robert San Aung said they would appeal the decision. On 21 March 2016, the commander of the Kyaikmaraw Township Police Station allegedly sent a letter to Ma Thandar stating that the public prosecutor's office had decided that it would be “erroneous” to open a criminal case against members of the military.

== Criticism of investigation ==
The circumstances of his death provoked international concern, with the U.S. calling on Myanmar to conduct a "credible and transparent investigation.”

Aung Kyaw Naing's death, as well as increased government scrutiny of reporters and journalists, came just weeks before U.S. President Barack Obama’s visit to Myanmar to attend the ASEAN Summit and the East Asia Summit. During the visit, Obama praised Myanmar’s political progress, but stated that reforms were still incomplete.

In December 2015, Aung San Suu Kyi’s National League for Democracy, the country's longtime opposition, won parliamentary elections giving it a majority in parliament. In an interview with the Southeast Asian Press Alliance, the country’s new information minister, the writer Pe Myint, expressed his disagreement with the decision, calling it “totally unacceptable” and insisted he would keep working to bring the killers to justice.
