= Thann =

Thann may refer to:

== Places ==
=== Austria ===
- Thann (Warth), in Warth, Lower Austria
- Thann (Opponitz), in Opponitz, Lower Austria
- Thann (Hargelsberg), in Hargelsberg, Upper Austria

=== France ===
- Thann, Haut-Rhin
  - Canton of Thann, a former administrative unit

=== Germany ===
- Thann (Großkarolinenfeld), a borough of Großkarolinenfeld

== People ==
- Friedrich von und zu Thann, relative of Eberhard Friedrich von Venningen

== In fiction ==
- Danilo Thann, character in the Songs & Swords novel series by Elaine Cunningham, set in the Forgotten Realms campaign setting

== Other uses ==
- Battle of Thann (1809), during the War of the Fifth Coalition
- Hans von Thann, nickname for the bell-striker figure of the Zytglogge tower in Bern, Switzerland

== See also ==
- Than (disambiguation)
- Tanne (disambiguation)
