= Thory =

Thory may refer to:

- Thory, Somme, a commune in the French region of Picardy
- Thory, Yonne, a commune in the French region of Burgundy
- Thory or Thori is a Dynasty in Hindu religion in India.
- Claude-Antoine Thory (1759–1827), French court official, naturalist and historian

== See also ==
- Thony (name)
