= Thony (name) =

- Gender: Male

Origin
- Meaning: Anthony, Antonio

Other names
- See also: Tony

Thony may be a surname, given name or a nickname. As a given name or nickname, it is considered to be a creative spelling of Tony used as a male name in Sweden and Denmark (and to a lesser extent Norway and Finland) and on occasion as a female name in Denmark. The name is in use in the United States. As a surname, it is commonly spelled Thöny.

== Given name ==
- Thony Andenas (born 1974), French football player
- Thony Belizaire (1955 – 2013), Haitian photographer
- Thony De La Rosa, fictional protagonist of The Cleaning Lady

== Nickname ==
- Thony (born 1982; Federica Victoria Johanna Caiozzo), Italian singer and actress
- Thony Halili (1946 – 2018), nickname for Antonio Halili, Filipino politician
- Thony Hemery (born 1972), nickname for Anthony Hemery, French freestyle skier

== Surname ==
- Eduard Thöny (1866 - 1950), German artist
- Serge Thony, birthname of D'Chrome Foster (born 1977), American singer and actor.
- Wilhelm Thöny (1888 - 1949) Austrian artist

== See also ==
- Anthony
- Thon (name)
- Thone (disambiguation)
- Thong (surname)
- Thory (disambiguation)
- Tony (given name)
