= Thumm =

Thumm is a surname. Notable people with the surname include:

- Birgit Thumm (born 1980), German volleyball player
- Helmut Thumm (1895–1977), German general during World War II
- Thomas Thumm (born 1977), German politician
- Uwe Thumm, German-American physicist

== See also ==
- Thum (surname)
- Thun (disambiguation)
