= Thong (surname) =

- Language: Chinese

Thong is a Chinese and Cambodian surname.

== Origins ==
As a Chinese surname, Thong may be a spelling, based on the pronunciation in different varieties of Chinese, of the following surnames, listed by their spelling in Pinyin (which reflects the Mandarin Chinese pronunciation):

- Zhāng (traditional Chinese: 張; simplified Chinese: 张)
- Jiāng (Chinese: 蔣)
- Tāng (traditional Chinese: 湯; simplified Chinese: 汤), spelled Thong based on its Cantonese pronunciation (Jyutping: Tong1; Cantonese Yale: Tōng; IPA: /tʰɔːŋ⁵⁵/)
- Táng (Chinese: 唐), spelled Thong based on its Cantonese pronunciation (Jyutping: Tong4; Cantonese Yale: Tòhng; IPA: /tʰɔːŋ²¹/)
- Tóng (Chinese: 同)
- Tóng (Chinese: 童)

Thong is also a Cambodian surname (Khmer: ថោង; IPA: /t̪ʰoːŋ/), probably derived from one or more of the above Chinese surnames.

== Statistics ==
According to statistics cited by Patrick Hanks, 106 people on the island of Great Britain and none on the island of Ireland bore the surname Thong as of 2011. In 1881 there had been two people with this surname in Great Britain.

The 2010 United States census found 1,378 people with the surname Thong, making it the 19,581st-most-common name in the country. This represented an increase from 1,156 (21,156th-most-common) in the 2000 Census. In both censuses, about nine-tenths of the bearers of the surname identified as Asian, and less than 3% each as White or Black. It was the 899th-most-common surname among respondents to the 2000 Census who identified as Asian.

== People ==
- Thong Saw Pak (1924–2015), Singaporean weightlifter
- Thong Khon (ថោង ខុន; born 1951), Cambodian politician
- Shaun Thong (唐偉楓; born 1995), Hong Kong racecar driver

== See also ==
- Thony (name)
