= Burma Digest =

Weekly online journal

The Burma Digest is a weekly bilingual online journal, published by the Democracy for Burma Alliance, a web-based campaign group set up by Burmese refugees and human rights activists worldwide. It features articles written both in English and Burmese.

The Burma Digest, as well as all other campaign activities of the Democracy for Burma Alliance are 100% non-profit and volunteering-based. The publication is fully available for reading on Democracy for Burma Alliance's main page [www.tayzathuria.org.uk ]and on blog [www.burmadigest.wordpress.com]. Printable booklets are also offered for downloading and free distribution.

The first edition of the Burma Digest appeared in June 2005, featuring only three articles, in English. Nowadays, the average issue of the Burma Digest features more than ten articles in English, and ten in Burmese, as well as interviews with personalities involved in the struggle for democracy in Burma and political dissidents, a newsroom and photo gallery

== Aims and mission ==
- To increase international awareness of Human-rights abuses happening in Burma
- To increase awareness among people from Burma about their natural rights or human-rights
- Ultimately, to help improve human-rights situations in Burma.

== Visions and beliefs ==
As a pro-democracy journal, the Burma Digest makes a strong statement against totalitarian regimes, considering the currently ruling military junta as illegitimate and defending Burmese people's right to fundamental freedoms. The beliefs the Burma Digest is aimed to represent and to support are stated on the journal's website and blog:

1. We believe that all Burmese democratic activists and campaign groups will unite and join hands in the fight for democracy and human rights in Burma.
2. We believe that the momentum of our democratic movement will become very strong.
3. We believe that Burmese people will be able to overcome their fear and rise up against cruel military dictatorship.
4. We believe that democracy will prevail in our country.
5. We believe that our people will be able to enjoy human rights in our country.
6. We believe that all ethnic groups in our country will agree to live peacefully alongside each other and together as the Union of Burma.
7. We believe that all ethnic minority areas will become federal states inside the Union of Burma.
8. We believe that there will be independent judicial system with equality for all under the rule of law in our country.
9. We believe that our country will become prosperous as a united, democratic and stable country.
10. We believe that there will be a thriving market economy free from corrupt bureaucratic government control.
11. We believe that people will be able to earn their living easily in lawful and honest ways in our country.
12. We believe that there will be free, and good quality, basic education and health care for all in our country.
13. We believe that all regions in our country will be able to enjoy equal development, and modern infrastructures.
14. We believe that we will maintain a strong and professional armed forces which do not try to interfere in civilian affairs.
15. We believe that our country and our people will be well respected by the international community because of our democracy, stability and prosperity

== Political and social impact ==
As a campaign journal for democracy and human rights, the Burma Digest publishes articles mostly (though not exclusively) on social and political issues. However, the Burma Digest, as well as the Democracy for Burma Alliance is not directly affiliated to any political party, ethnic group or organization. It is a space of freedom of speech, reuniting diverse views and opinions. If certain articles show either support or disagreement towards certain organisations or issues, it is only based on the publication's values and beliefs concerning democracy and human rights.

== The Burma Digest Human Rights Literature award ==
Each year, (starting from August 8, the day of the commemoration of 8888 Uprising, until the next August 8, the Burma Digest offers an award for Burmese language articles and poetry. Each month, two articles and two poems are nominated, then the winner is chosen out of 5 finalists articles/poems.

The prize for the best article is US$250. The prize for the best poem is US$150. This project and the prizes are funded by donations.

== See also ==
- Burma
- Politics of Burma
- Aung San Suu Kyi
- National League for Democracy
