= Theos =

Theos may refer to:

- THEOS, a computer operating system
- THEOS (satellite), a satellite launched in 2008 by Thailand
- Theos (think tank), a UK public theology think tank
- Theos Casimir Bernard (1908–1947), American explorer and author

== See also ==
- Thea (disambiguation)
- Theo (disambiguation)
