= Delambre (crater) =

Crater on the Moon

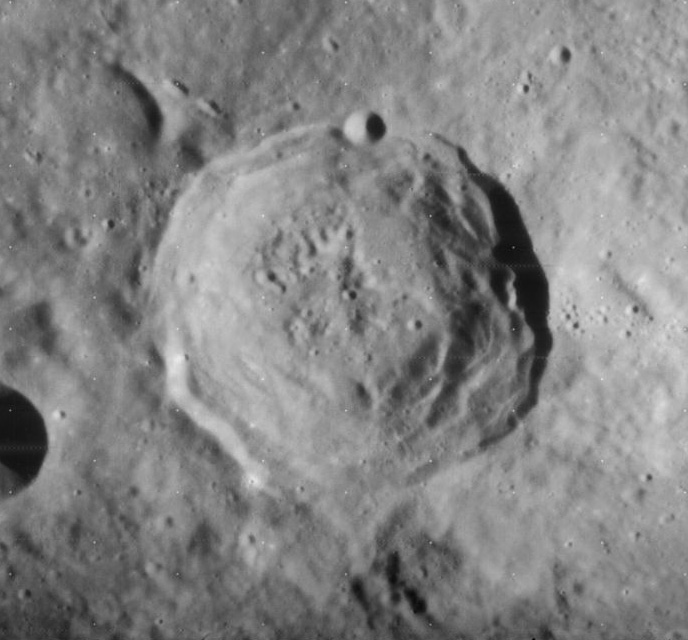
- Lunar Orbiter 4 image
- Coordinates: 1.9°S 17.5°E
- Diameter: 51.49 km (31.99 mi)
- Depth: 3.01 km (1.87 mi)
- Colongitude: 342° at sunrise
- Eponym: Jean B. J. Delambre

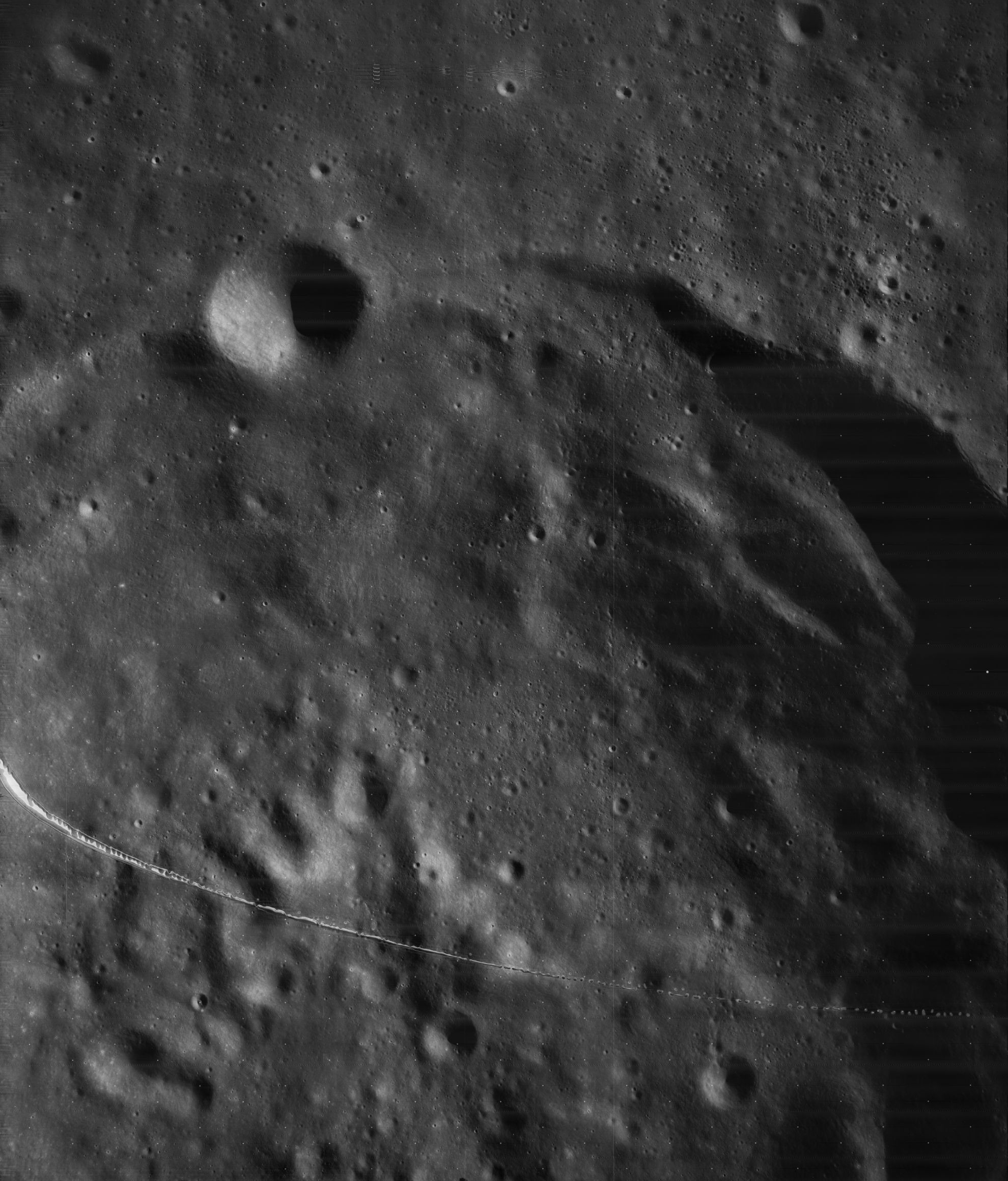
Interior from Lunar Orbiter 3 (streak is blemish on original)

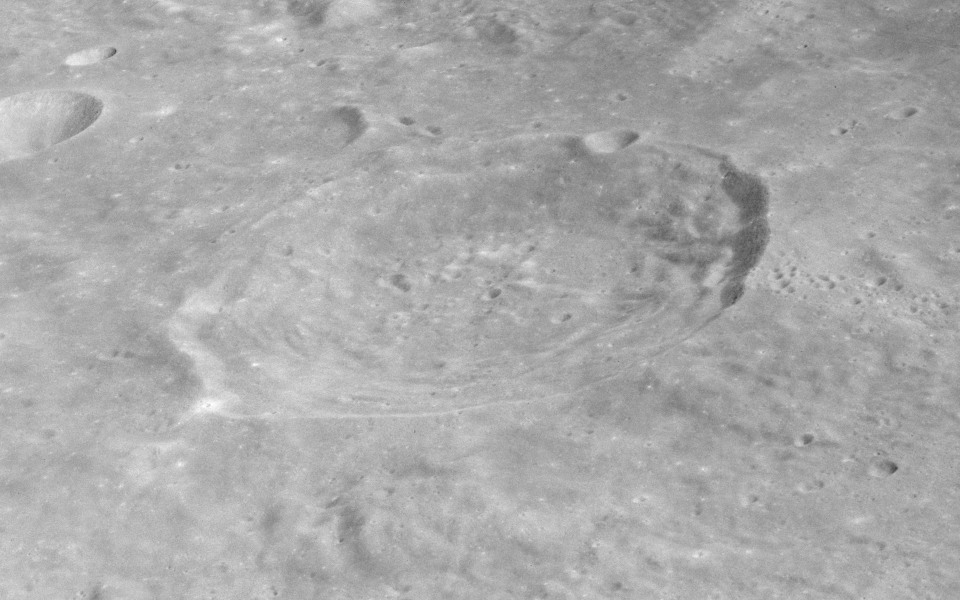
Oblique view of Delambre from Apollo 16

Delambre is a lunar impact crater that lies to the southwest of Mare Tranquillitatis, in the central highland region. It is 51 kilometers in diameter and 3 kilometers deep. To the west is the crater pair of Theon Junior and Theon Senior, the latter being more distant and located to the northwest.

The polygonal rim of Delambre has a terraced interior, with a tiny craterlet lying along the northern rim. In the south is a low cut forming a slight notch. The crater interior has an irregular surface. It has high walls, with some peaks reaching 15,000 feet (4.6 km). Delambre was photographed by the uncrewed probe Ranger 8 on its descent towards Mare Tranquillitatis. Delambre is from the Upper Imbrian epoch, which lasted from 3.8 to 3.2 billion years ago.

This formation was named for the French astronomer Jean Baptiste Joseph Delambre (1749-1822). Its designation was officially adopted by the International Astronomical Union in 1935.

== Satellite craters ==
By convention these features are identified on lunar maps by placing the letter on the side of the crater midpoint that is closest to Delambre.

Delambre	Latitude	Longitude	Diameter
B	1.7° S	19.6° E	10 km
D	1.1° S	17.6° E	5 km
F	1.0° S	19.3° E	5 km
H	1.0° S	16.4° E	16 km
J	0.3° S	16.8° E	12 km
