= Thon =

Thon may refer to:

- Thon (mythology), a figure from Greek mythology
- Thon (name), a surname and given name
- Thon (river), northern France
- Thon (A Canticle for Leibowitz), an academic rank similar to a university "don" in the science fiction novel A Canticle for Leibowitz
- -thon, -athon, or -a-thon, a generic suffix and back-formation from marathon, usually used for fundraising events
  - Telethon, a televised fundraising event
  - Walkathon, a fundraising event involving walking
  - Penn State IFC/Panhellenic Dance Marathon (THON), an annual 46-hour fundraiser combatting pediatric cancer
- "Thon", proposed third-person singular gender-neutral pronoun

== See also ==
- Than (disambiguation)
- Thou (disambiguation)
- Thun (disambiguation)
- Tron (disambiguation)
