= Theon of Alexandria =

Greek scholar and mathematician (c. 335–405)

Theon of Alexandria (/ˌθiːən, -ɒn/; Ancient Greek: Θέων ὁ Ἀλεξανδρεύς; c. AD 335 – c. 405) was a Greek scholar and mathematician who lived in Alexandria, Egypt. He edited and arranged Euclid's Elements and wrote commentaries on works by Euclid and Ptolemy. His daughter, Hypatia, also won fame as a mathematician.

== Life ==
Little is known about Theon's life. He made predictions and observations of solar and lunar eclipses in 364, which show he was active at that time, and he is said to have lived during the reign of Theodosius I (379–395).

The Suda, a tenth-century Byzantine encyclopedia, calls Theon a "man of the Mouseion". However, both the Library of Alexandria and the original Mouseion saw decline and eventually closed in the third century AD and according to classical historian Edward J. Watts, Theon was probably the head of a school called the "Mouseion", which was named in emulation of the Hellenistic Mouseion that had once included the Library of Alexandria, but which had little other connection to it. Theon's school was exclusive, highly prestigious, and doctrinally conservative. Neither Theon nor his daughter Hypatia seems to have had any connections to the militant Iamblichean Neoplatonists who taught in the Serapeum of Alexandria and instead preferred Plotinian neoplatonism.

Theon was the father of the mathematician Hypatia, who succeeded him as head of his school Theon dedicated his commentary on the Almagest to a boy named Epiphanius, who may have been his son. Also, in his commentary on the Almagest he states that his daughter Hypatia contributed to Book III of the Almagest stating "the edition having been prepared by the philosopher, my daughter Hypatia."

A lunar crater, Theon Junior, now bears Theon's name.

== Works ==
=== Edited works ===
It is known that Theon edited the Elements of Euclid. He may also have edited other works by Euclid and Ptolemy, although the evidence for this is less certain. The editions ascribed to Theon are:

- Euclid's Elements. Theon's edition of the Elements was the only known version until François Peyrard discovered an older copy of the Elements in the Vatican Library in 1808. Comparison of the two versions shows that Theon's edition attempts to remove difficulties that might be felt by learners in studying the text. Hence, he amplified Euclid's text whenever he thought that an argument was too brief; attempted to standardise the way that Euclid wrote; and he corrected mistakes in the text, although occasionally he introduced his own errors. Thomas Little Heath notes on Theon's edits include, "remarkably close approximations (stated in sexagesimal fractions)".
- Ptolemy's Handy Tables. A collection of astronomical tables originally compiled by Ptolemy. It has often been claimed in modern times that Theon edited this text. However, none of the surviving manuscripts mention Theon, and the evidence suggests that the surviving tables must be very similar to the tables Ptolemy provided. It has, however, been thought possible that his daughter Hypatia edited (or verified) the Handy Tables, since the Suda refers to her work on the "Astronomical Canon".
- Euclid's Optics. Euclid's work on optics survives in two versions, and it has been argued that one version may be an edition by Theon.

=== Commentaries ===
Of his commentaries, those which are extant are:

- Commentary on the Data of Euclid. This work is written at a relatively advanced level, as Theon tends to shorten Euclid's proofs rather than amplify them.
- Commentary on the Optics of Euclid. This elementary-level work is believed to consist of lecture notes compiled by a student of Theon.
- Commentary on the Almagest. Originally a commentary on all thirteen books of Ptolemy's Almagest, but now missing book 11 and most of book 5. The commentary is a reworking of Theon's own lecture notes, and is useful chiefly for including information from lost works by writers such as Pappus. It is also useful for Theon's account of the Greek method of operating with the sexagesimal system as it was applied to calculations.
- Great Commentary on Ptolemy's Handy Tables. This work partially survives. It originally consisted of 5 books, of which books 1–3 and the beginning of book 4 are extant. It describes how to use Ptolemy's tables and explains the reasoning behind the calculations.
- Little Commentary on Ptolemy's Handy Tables. This work survives completely. It consists of one book and is intended as a primer for students. In this work, Theon mentions that certain (unnamed) ancient astrologers believed that the precession of the equinoxes, rather than being a steady, unending motion, instead reverses direction every 640 years, and that the last reversal had been in 158 BC. Theon describes but did not endorse this theory. This idea inspired Thābit ibn Qurra in the 9th century to create the theory of trepidation to explain a variation which he (incorrectly) believed was affecting the rate of precession.
- Commentary on Aratus. Some extant scholia on the Phaenomena of Aratus are attributed doubtfully to Theon.

=== Original works ===
- Treatise on the Astrolabe. Both the Suda and Arabic sources attribute a work on the astrolabe to Theon. This work has not survived, but it may have been the first ever treatise on the astrolabe, and it was important in transmitting Greek knowledge on this instrument to later ages. The extant treatises on the astrolabe by the 6th-century Greek scholar John Philoponus and by the 7th-century Syriac scholar Severus Sebokht draw heavily on Theon's work.
- Catoptrics. The authorship of this treatise, ascribed to Euclid, is disputed. It has been argued that Theon wrote or compiled it. The Catoptrics concerns the reflection of light and the formation of images by mirrors.

Among Theon's lost works, the Suda mentions On Signs and Observation of Birds and the Sound of Crows; On the Rising of the Dog[-Star]; and On the Inundation of the Nile.

== See also ==
- Agora (film)
- Theon of Smyrna
