= Theo (disambiguation) =

Theo is a feminine and masculine given name and nickname.

Theo may also refer to:

== Geography ==
- Theo, Mississippi, United States, an unincorporated community
- Théo River, a tributary of the Turgeon River in Quebec, Canada

== People ==
- Allan Théo, French singer born Alain Rouget in 1972
- Louise Théo, French operetta singer Cécile Piccolo (1854–1922)
- Michael Theo (formerly Theoklitos) (born 1981), Australian soccer goalkeeper

== Arts and entertainment ==
- Theo (film), a 2013 film starring Dakota Johnson
- Theo, a lion in the live-action PBS Kids series Between the Lions

== Other uses ==
- THEO (Testing the Habitability of Enceladus's Ocean), a proposed spacecraft mission
- Theo (dog) (2009–2011), a British Army bomb-detection dog awarded the 2012 Dickin Medal for bravery
- Theo Chocolate, a chocolatier in Seattle, Washington, US
- Theo, also known as "ADT", short for "theoretical loss" or "Average Daily Theoretical", a calculation used to determine gamblers' casino comps

== See also ==
- All pages starting with "Theo"
- All pages starting with "Théo"
