= Theon Junior (crater) =

Crater on the Moon

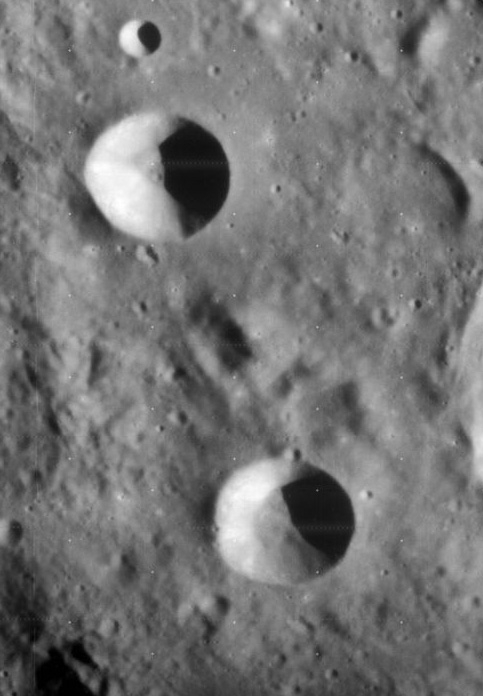
- Lunar Orbiter 4 image of Theon Senior (top) and Theon Junior (bottom)
- Coordinates: 2.3°S 15.8°E
- Diameter: 17 km
- Depth: 3,580 m
- Colongitude: 344° at sunrise
- Eponym: Theon of Alexandria

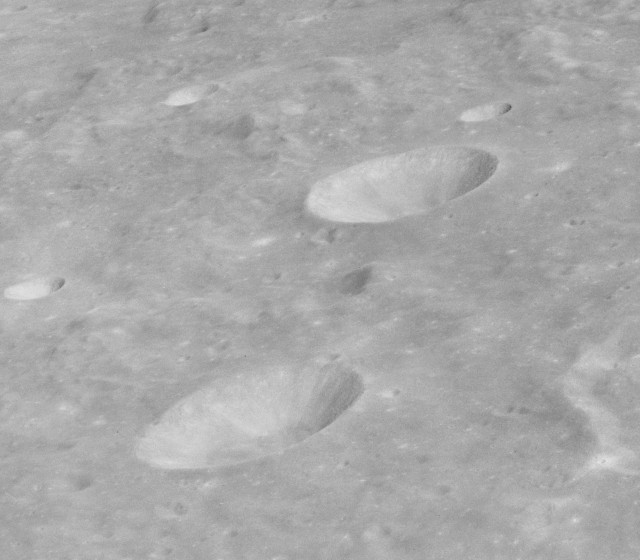
Oblique view of Theon Senior (top) and Theon Junior (bottom) from Apollo 16

Theon Junior is a lunar impact crater that is located just to the west-southwest of the crater Delambre. It forms a matching pair with Theon Senior, only a couple of crater diameters to the north-northwest. The crater is circular and bowl-shaped, with a small floor at the bottom of the high, sloping interior walls. It is named for Theon of Alexandria, a 4th-century Greek astronomer and mathematician. The crater is from the Eratosthenian period, which lasted from 3.2 to 1.1 billion years ago. It is 17 kilometers in diameter and the difference in height at its rim and its deepest part is 3,580 meters.

== Satellite craters ==
By convention these features are identified on lunar maps by placing the letter on the side of the crater midpoint that is closest to Theon Junior.

Theon Junior	Latitude	Longitude	Diameter
B	2.1° S	13.3° E	8 km
C	2.3° S	14.7° E	4 km
