= Tiina Trutsi =

Estonian footballer

Personal information
- Full name: Tiina Trutsi
- Date of birth: 19 February 1994 (age 32)
- Place of birth: Estonia
- Height: 5 ft 6 in (1.68 m)
- Position: Midfielder

Team information
- Current team: Barcelona FA
- Number: 20

Youth career
- Flora Tallinn

College career
Years	Team	Apps	(Gls)
2014–2017	South Alabama	79	(5)

Senior career*
Years	Team	Apps	(Gls)
2008–2015	Flora Tallinn	101	(22)
2018–	Barcelona FA		

International career^{‡}
2009–2010	Estonia U17	11	(0)
2010–2013	Estonia U19	24	(0)
2012–2015	Estonia	20	(0)
- * Club domestic league appearances and goals as of 12 September 2018 ‡ National team caps and goals as of 20 April 2016

Tiina Trutsi (born 19 February 1994) is an Estonian footballer, who plays as a midfielder for Cypriot team Barcelona FA and the Estonian national team.

== Career ==
Trutsi made her debut for the Estonia women's national football team on 8 June 2012 against Lithuania and has since been capped 20 times.

In June 2018, she joined Cypriot champion Barcelona FA. She has 15 international caps.

== Honours ==
- Young Female Player of the Year 2012.
