= Then =

Then may refer to:

- Then language, spoken in Guizhou province of China
- "Then", a song on the 1970 album Time and a Word by English rock band Yes
- Then (Canadian series), a 1999 compilation album released in Canada
- Then (Misako Odani album), a 2002 album by Japanese singer Misako Odani
- Then: The Earlier Years, a 1997 compilation album by rock band They Might Be Giants
- "Then" (Anne-Marie song), 2017
- "Then" (The Charlatans song), 1990
- "Then" (Brad Paisley song), 2009
- Part of the "if-then-else" conditional construct in computer programming

== See also ==
- Than (disambiguation)
- Thoen (name)
