= Sixtus Armin Thon =

German painter, etcher and lithographer

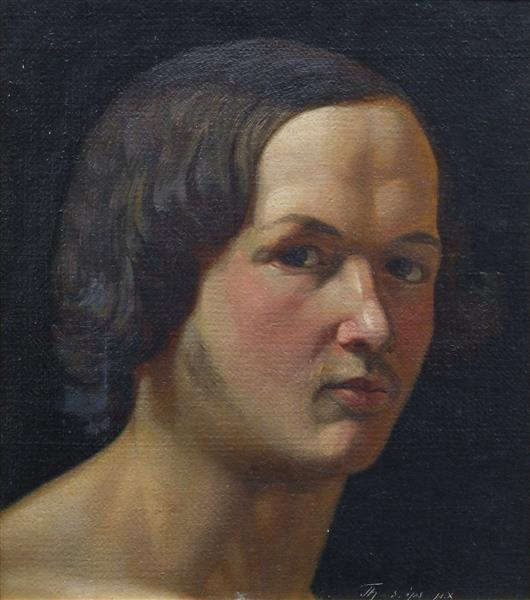
- Self-portrait (1837)
- Born: Sixtus Armin Thon; November 10, 1817; Eisenach, Germany
- Died: September 26, 1901 (aged 83); Weimar, Germany
- Education: Academy of Fine Arts, Leipzig; Weimar Princely Free Drawing School
- Known for: Painting, Etching, Lithography
- Notable work: Lithographs for Die Gartenlaube
- Parent: Theodor Thon (father)

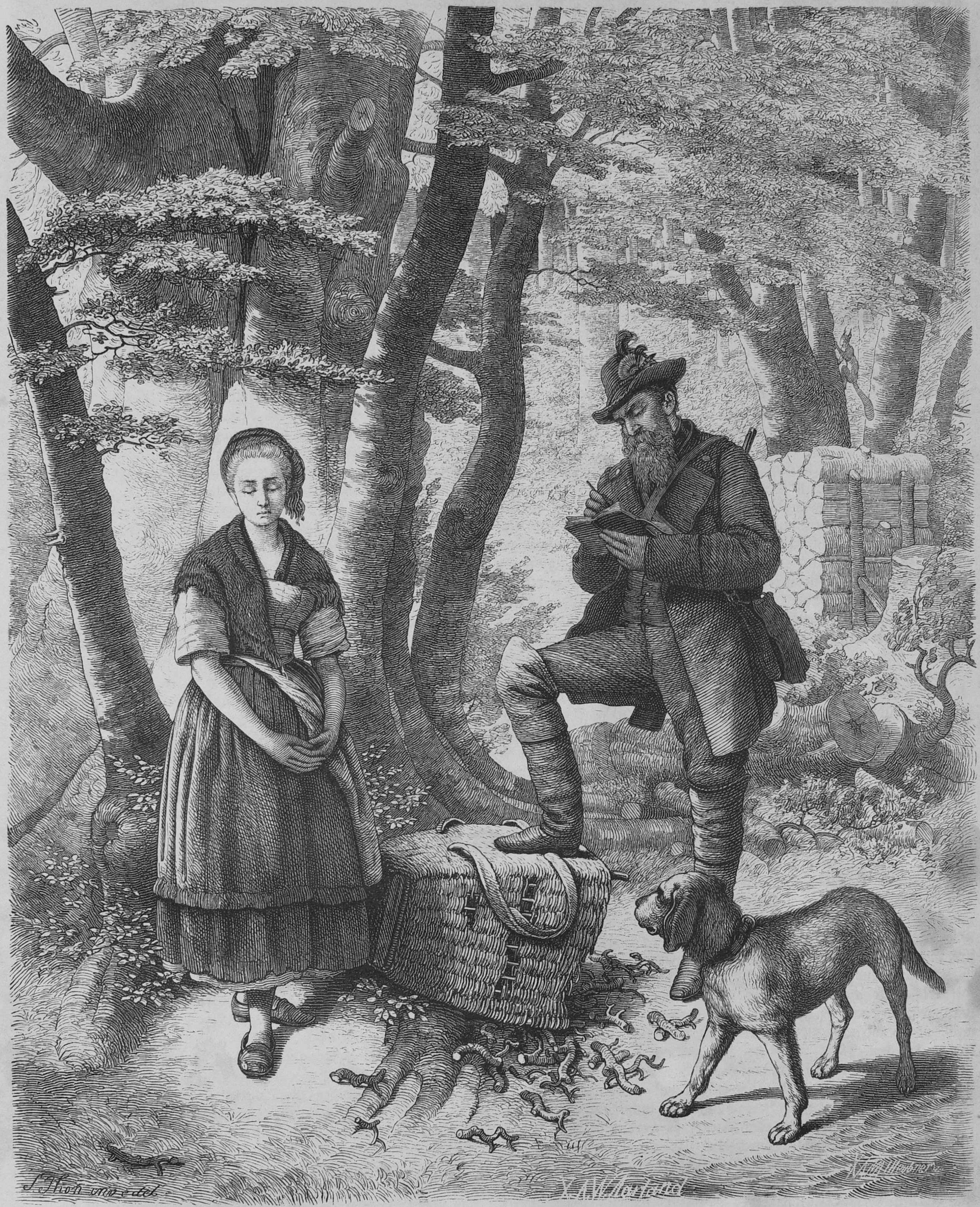
"Die Waldbuße" (Forest Penance) from Die Gartenlaube

Sixtus Armin Thon (10 November 1817 – 26 September 1901) was a German painter, etcher and lithographer. There is widespread disagreement over whether his name was Sixtus or Sixt, even though his gravestone says "Sixtus".

== Life and work ==
He was born in Eisenach, the son of naturalist and mineralogist Theodor Thon, who was also an amateur engraver. In 1837, he studied painting at the Academy of Fine Arts, Leipzig, then transferred to the Weimar Princely Free Drawing School, where his primary instructor was Friedrich Preller the Elder.

He also took study trips to the Netherlands and Norway and completed his training at the Royal Academy of Fine Arts Antwerp. In the 1850s, he ran one of the first photography studios in Weimar.

In 1861, he became a teacher at his alma mater, the Drawing school. He served as the interim Director there in 1873. For a time, he also taught at the "Sophienstift", a school for girls established by Princess Sophie of the Netherlands. He was largely known for landscapes and genre scenes, but the etchings and lithographs he made for Die Gartenlaube and other publications are probably his most familiar works.

Thon died in Weimar in 1901. The municipal collection in Braunschweig possesses a large number of his original materials.
