= Than, Kandi Dholran =

Village in Himachal Pradesh, India

Than is a small village near the Kandi-Saroot Road, around 3 kilometres (1.9 mi) from Kandi Dholran in the Indian state of Himachal Pradesh. The village has a small population but the name "Than" is given to a large and hill-covered geographical region.

At present this village is counted among the backward villages of the country. The reason behind this is that the village has not yet been provided with the basic medical facilities or roads. At present the village is around 1.2 km away from the road. To reach the road involves a walk of 1.3 km on a very narrow (2 to 3 feet wide) way up to the road. Steps are now being taken towards constructing a road to link the village to the Kandi-Saroot road.

As of 2011 census of India, the population of the village is 280. More than 50% of the village population belongs to Scheduled Castes. There is a tradition of service in the Indian Army. Around 30% of the villagers are in the Army, 20% work in the private and IT sector, and the rest carry out labor on a daily basis.
