= Thien =

Thien may refer to:

- Thien Buddhism
- Madeleine Thien, Canadian writer

== See also ==
- Thiên (disambiguation)
- Thiene
- Thoen (disambiguation)
