= Thum (surname) =

Thum is a surname. Notable people with the surname include:

- Christian Thum (d. 1655), German-born Swedish actor and theater director
- Denny Thum (born 1952), American football executive
- Gregor Thum (born 1967), German historian
- Joe Thum (fl. 1880s–1910s), American bowler
- Jon Thum (fl. 1990s–2010s), visual effects artist
- Patty Prather Thum (1853–1926), American artist
- Peter Thum, American entrepreneur and businessman
- Robert Thum (fl. 1920s–1930s), Austrian table tennis player
- Steffen Thum (born 1988), German composer
- Thum Ping Tjin (born 1979), also known as PJ Thum, is a Singaporean historian and journalist
- William Thum (1861–1941), Mayor of Pasadena, California

== See also ==
- Thum (disambiguation)
- Thumm
