= Theon Senior (crater) =

Crater on the Moon

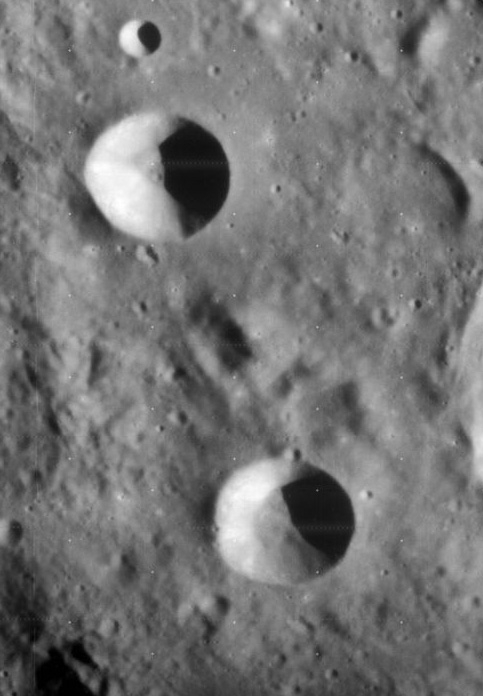
- Lunar Orbiter 4 image of Theon Senior (top) and Theon Junior (bottom)
- Coordinates: 0.8°S 15.4°E
- Diameter: 18 km
- Depth: 3.47 km (2.16 mi)
- Colongitude: 345° at sunrise
- Eponym: Theon of Smyrna

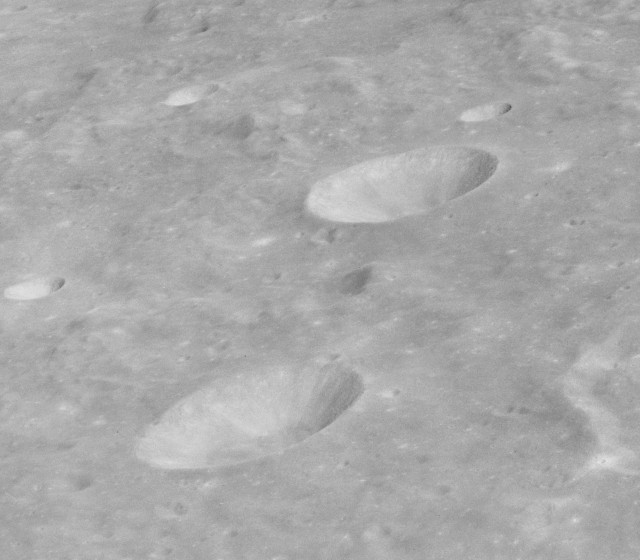
Oblique view of Theon Senior (top) and Theon Junior (bottom) from Apollo 16

Theon Senior is a lunar impact crater that is located to the northwest of the crater Delambre, and south of D'Arrest. It forms a matching pair with Theon Junior, about two crater diameters to the south-southeast. The satellite crater Theon Senior A can be found to the north. Theon Senior is named for Theon of Smyrna, a 1st-2nd century Greek mathematician and philosopher.

This impact dates to the Eratosthenian epoch of lunar geological history. The crater is circular and bowl-shaped, with only a small floor at the center of the steeply sloping interior walls. The crater appears relatively young, as it shows little sign of wear due to impacts. The crater is about 18 kilometers in diameter, and the distance from its rim to the floor is 3470 meters. Theon Senior is from the Eratosthenian period, which lasted from 3.2 to 1.1 billion years ago.

== Satellite craters ==
By convention these features are identified on lunar maps by placing the letter on the side of the crater midpoint that is closest to Theon Senior.

| Theon Senior | Latitude | Longitude | Diameter |
|---|---|---|---|
| A | 0.2° S | 15.4° E | 5 km |
| B | 0.2° N | 14.1° E | 6 km |
| C | 1.4° S | 14.5° E | 6 km |

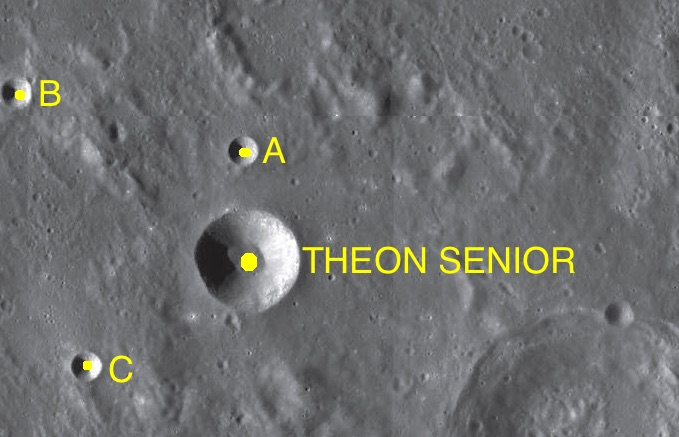
Satellite craters of Theon Senior

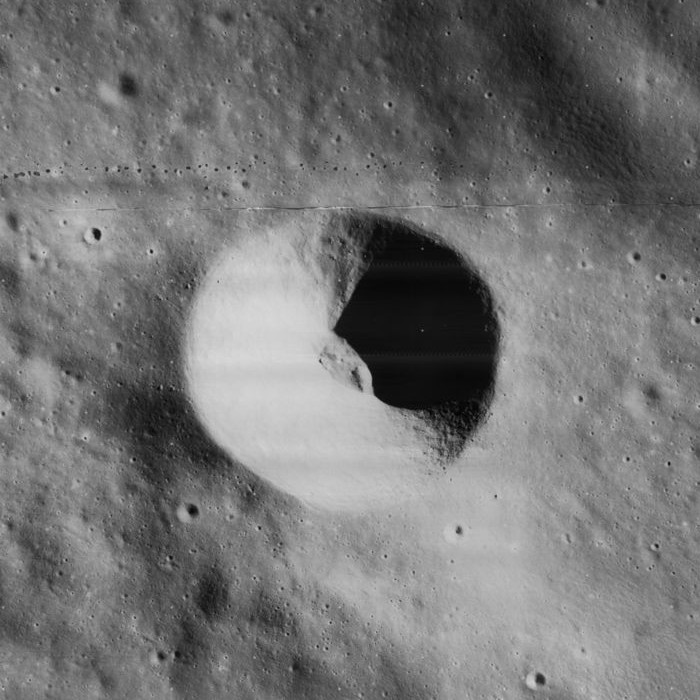
Theon Senior C
