= Theodor Thon =

German naturalist, engraver and inventor (1792–1838)

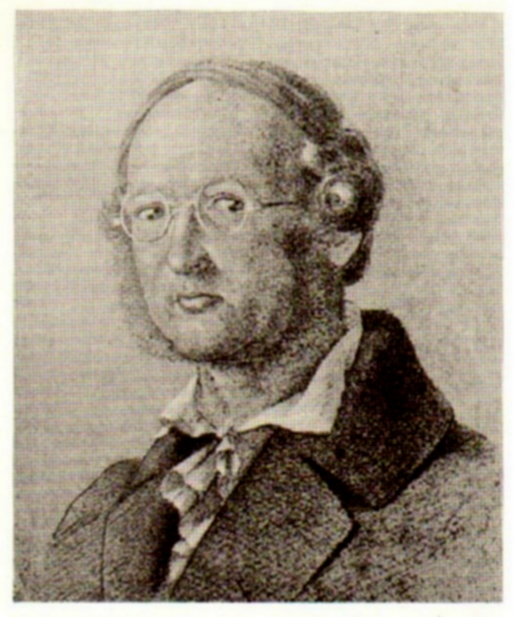

Theodor Thon (14 May 1792 – 17 November 1838) was a German naturalist, engraver, and inventor of a shorthand writing system. He taught a wide range of subjects at the University of Jena including some of the first academic lectures in stenography. His son Sixtus Armin Thon became an engraver.

== Biography ==
Thon was born on 14 May 1792, in Eisenach. After graduating from the local gymnasium he went to the University of Jena where he studied mineralogy. In 1811, he received a doctorate for a new system of mineral classification. He worked as a docent and in 1813 he moved to Eisenach becoming a registrar of the Grand Duchal State in 1816. In 1821, he moved to Weimar where he began to draw and produce copper engravings. In 1827, his position at the University of Jena was renewed and he gave private lectures in science. He took an interest in natural history, mineralogy and began to organize lectures in stenography. He modified the system of shorthand developed by Karl Gottlieb Horstig (1763–1835). In 1834, he was promoted to extraordinary professor. He contributed drawings and engravings to the works of others. He published works on a wide range of topics including cooking, illustration, specimen collecting, stenography, economics, and home decoration. He also founded an entomological periodical calledEntomologisches Archiv of which only two volumes were produced between 1827 and 1830.

Thon was married thrice. One of his sons Sixtus Armin Thon became a director of a drawing school in Weimar while another, Guido became a physician in Queensland, Australia. He died on 17 November 1838, aged 46.
