= Toen =

Toen may refer to:

- Taoyuan (disambiguation), a variety of locations in China and Taiwan
- Toen (commune), a commune in Koun Mom District, Cambodia

== See also ==
- Thoen (name)
