= Havank =

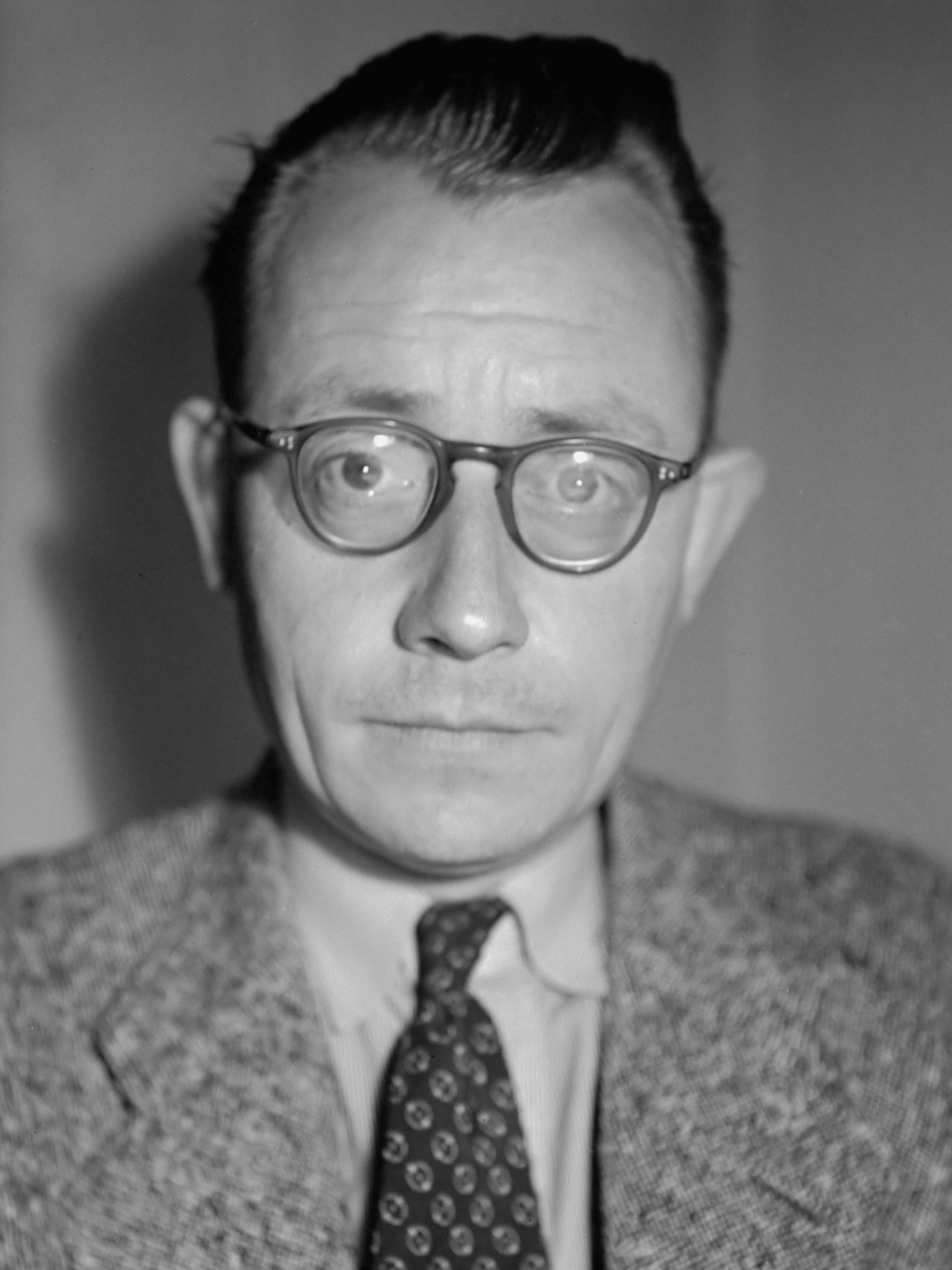
Havank (1942)

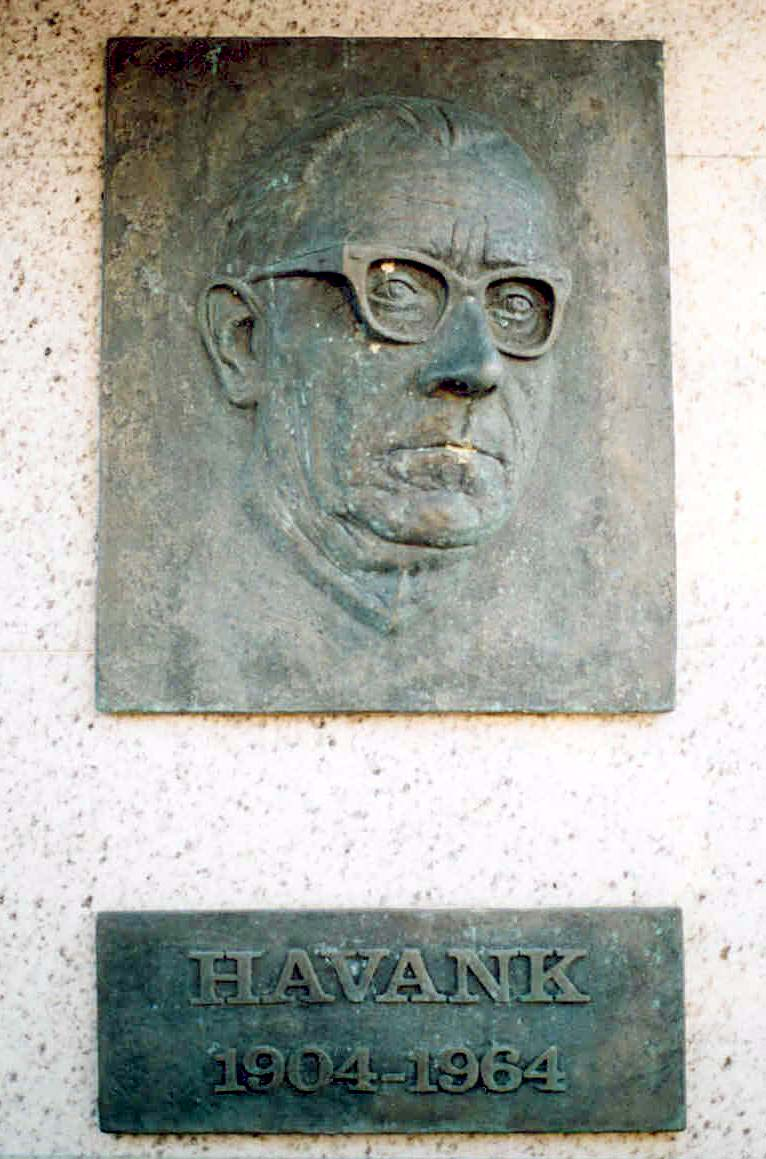
Havank memorial in Leeuwarden by Ben van der Geest

Havank, pseudonym of Hendrikus Frederikus (Hans) van der Kallen (February 19, 1904 – June 22, 1964), was a Dutch writer, journalist and translator. He published over 30 crime novels and is considered one of the founding fathers of the Dutch detective genre.

== Biography ==
Van der Kallen was born in Leeuwarden and, under the pen-name of Havank, published over 30 crime-novels and stories, with as principal characters French police officers Bruno Silvère and Charles C.M. Carlier (the latter better known as De Schaduw, "the Shadow").

During World War II, Havank worked as an editor, and occasionally as a war correspondent, for the London edition of the Dutch weekly Vrij Nederland. Shortly after the war, he was invited to ghost-write the memoirs of Lieutenant-Colonel Oreste Pinto, the original spycatcher. These memoirs were serialized in the News Chronicle.

Havank also translated some 45 novels into Dutch, mainly those of fellow crime writers like Leslie Charteris, Raymond Chandler, and E. Phillips Oppenheim. Since the mid-1950s, his books were published in paperback editions with covers designed by the illustrator Dick Bruna. Havank is estimated to have sold more than 6 million copies in his lifetime. His books remained in print until the early 1980s when sales began to decline. However, they still are available in print-on-demand editions. To date, only two of the books have been translated into another language; both in German but published in Switzerland. After his death, an unfinished novel was finished and published by journalist Pieter Terpstra, who continued to churn out Havank titles under the name Havank-Terpstra.

Havank lived most of his life abroad in the south of France, on Mallorca (Spain), and in England. He died of a heart attack back in Leeuwarden, less than thirty yards distance from his birthplace. The Dutch forensic system, HAVANK, links criminals and their fingerprints via what is called a HAVANK number.
