= Ohn Than =

Burmese democracy activist (born 1946)

U Ohn Than
- အုန်းသန်း
- Born: 1946 (age 79–80); Ngathinechaung Township, Irrawaddy Division, British Burma
- Education: Rangoon University

Ohn Than (Burmese: အုန်းသန်း, pronounced [ʔóʊɰ̃ θáɰ̃]; commonly written U Ohn Than, following Burmese honorific conventions; born 1946) is a Burmese democracy activist who received international attention for his "stoic one-man protests". He spent the majority of the years from 1988 to 2012 imprisoned, and Amnesty International considered him a prisoner of conscience.

== Personal life ==
Ohn Than was born in 1946 in Ngathinechaung Township, Irrawaddy Division. He received a B.Sc. in forestry from Rangoon University in 1971, and began working for the State Timber Corporation, where he served until his first arrest.

Ohn Than is a widower, and has one son and one daughter.

== Role in 8888 Uprising ==
In 1988, a series of protests broke out opposing the military rule of Ne Win. In September 1987, Ne Win had voided most denominations of the kyat without warning, causing many people to lose their savings overnight. Students who saved money for tuition fees were particularly affected. The announcement led to riots at several universities. The situation was further exacerbated by the shooting of protesting student Phone Maw in a 12 March 1988 clash with police. The student-led protests continued to grow through August of that year, and on 8 August 1988 (8-8-88), a general strike began from which the 8888 Uprising would later take its name.

Ohn Than became involved in the uprising at this time, leading protests in Shwegoo township in Kachin State. He was arrested and sentenced to 8 years' imprisonment under the Emergency Provision Act, Section 5 (J). He passed one and a half years of this sentence at Bamaw prison and four and a half years at Mandalay prison before his 1995 release.

In 1996, he was rearrested for distributing a pamphlet titled "A Call for the Fight for Burma’s Human Rights". He was sentenced again under Emergency Provision Act, Section 5 (J) and imprisoned for seven more years, this time in Tharrawaddy prison. He was released in 2003.

== 2004 solo protest ==
On 21 September 2004, Ohn Than staged his first solo protest, standing alone before the Yangon office of the United Nations Development Program with a poster calling for free elections and a UN investigation of the "Depayin Massacre". The protest was timed to match the first day of the current United Nations General Assembly session. Three men appeared during his demonstration and led him away. Another man, Thet Wai, was arrested and charged with aiding him the following day.

Thet Wai and Ohn Than were subsequently sentenced to two years' imprisonment apiece under Burmese penal code article 505(b): "intent to cause, or which is likely to cause, fear or alarm to the public or to any section of the public whereby any person may be induced to commit an offence against the State or against the public tranquility".

== 2007 solo protests and imprisonment ==
On 12 February 2007—Burma's Union Day—Ohn Than again appeared in international news by protesting alone outside of the National League for Democracy headquarters in Yangon.

In August 2007, a new wave of protests hit Yangon following unrest over rising food and fuel prices. These protests would later become popularly known as the "Saffron Revolution" after the robe color of the many Buddhist monks who took a leadership role.

Ohn Than again helped lead the protests, staging another solo demonstration before the US Embassy in downtown Yangon on 23 August. He held up posters calling for UN Secretary-General Ban Ki-moon to intervene to protect protesters from military reprisals, and for troops in the Tatmadaw (Burmese armed forces) to refuse the orders of their superiors. One sign read:

Form a Government that Represents the People / Listen and Act On What People Want / End Military Ruling, Now China and Russia's Vetoes—Go To Hell!

His protest ended when he was arrested by plainclothes security forces.

He was subsequently held in a military camp until January 2008, when he was taken to Yangon's Insein Prison for trial on charges under article 124 (A) of the criminal code, “acts that destabilize the government". Amnesty International reports that he was not allowed legal representation. On 3 April 2008, he was given a life sentence and a fine of less than $1 USD. He was subsequently moved between three different prisons, ending at Khamti prison in Sagiang Division. In June 2008, he contracted cerebral malaria, but recovered.

Ohn Than's sentence was protested by Human Rights Watch, which included him in its report Burma's Forgotten Prisoners. Amnesty International named him a prisoner of conscience and also demanded his immediate release.

== Release ==
According to the Assistance Association for Political Prisoners, Ohn Than was pardoned on 13 January 2012, as part of a series of amnesties for political prisoners.
