= Thaon (surname) =

Thaon is a French surname that may refer to the following notable people:

- Charles Thaon (1910–2000), French speed skater
- Charles-François Thaon, Count of Saint-André (1725–1807), army commander for the Kingdom of Sardinia
- Paolo Ignazio Maria Thaon di Revel (1888–1973), Italian politician and fencer
- Paolo Thaon di Revel (1859–1948), Italian admiral
  - Italian offshore patrol vessel Paolo Thaon di Revel

== See also ==
- Thon (name)
