= Thiên =

Thiên is a Vietnamese word which can refer to:

- Thiền, a Vietnamese version of Zen Buddhism

== People ==
- Lê Hoàng Thiên
- Mẫu Thượng Thiên
- Quốc Thiên
- Thiên Y A Na
- Thừa Thiên (empress)
- Thuận Thiên (Trần dynasty empress)
- Thuận Thiên (Nguyễn dynasty empress)

== See also ==
- Thien (disambiguation)
- Thiene
- Thoen (disambiguation)
