= Thoen =

Thoen may refer to one of the following.

- Thoen District in Lampang Province, Thailand
- Thoen Stone, sandstone slab dated 1834, discovered in South Dakota, USA
- Thoen (name)

== See also ==
- Thone (disambiguation)
- Thorn (disambiguation)
- Toen (disambiguation)
