= Win Maw Oo =

Martyred student

- ဝင်းမော်ဦး
- Photograph taken by Steve Lehman and appeared on the cover of Newsweek. It shows Win Maw Oo after she has been shot while two doctors carry her to an ambulance.
- Born: 19 November 1971; Kyimyindaing Township, Yangon
- Died: 19 September 1988 (aged 16); Yangon

Win Maw Oo (Burmese: ဝင်းမော်ဦး; 19 November 1971 – 19 September 1988) was a Burmese student activist who was killed during the 8888 Uprising in Burma (Myanmar). She is considered one of the most prominent heroes of Burma's pro-democracy movement.

== Early life and education ==
Win Maw Oo, the eldest of six siblings, was born on 19 November 1971 in Kyimyindaing Township, Yangon. She went to Basic Education High School (4), Kyimyindaing. She was a member of the Basic Education Students' Union (BESU).

== Death ==
Against her parents' wishes, she marched with her classmates on 19 September 1988, carrying a picture of Independent hero Bogyoke Aung San. She was shot by soldiers as part of the Myanmar military's crackdown on the protests, receiving two bullets in her legs and one in her chest.

== Legacy ==
An image of Win Maw Oo's bloodied body being carried by two medical students became an emblem for the opposition against Myanmar's brutal military regime. Her sacrifice became an icon of the "88 movement".

Win Maw Oo's last request was to not perform her last funeral rites until Burma enjoys democracy. 28 years later, in May 2016, one month after the democratically elected government led by Aung San Suu Kyi came to power, her family held the last Buddhist funerary rites of Win Maw Oo. The event was widely publicized.

She is the subject of a film by U Anthony which depicts her real-life events surrounding the death.
