= Theon Design =

Workshop in Deddington, England

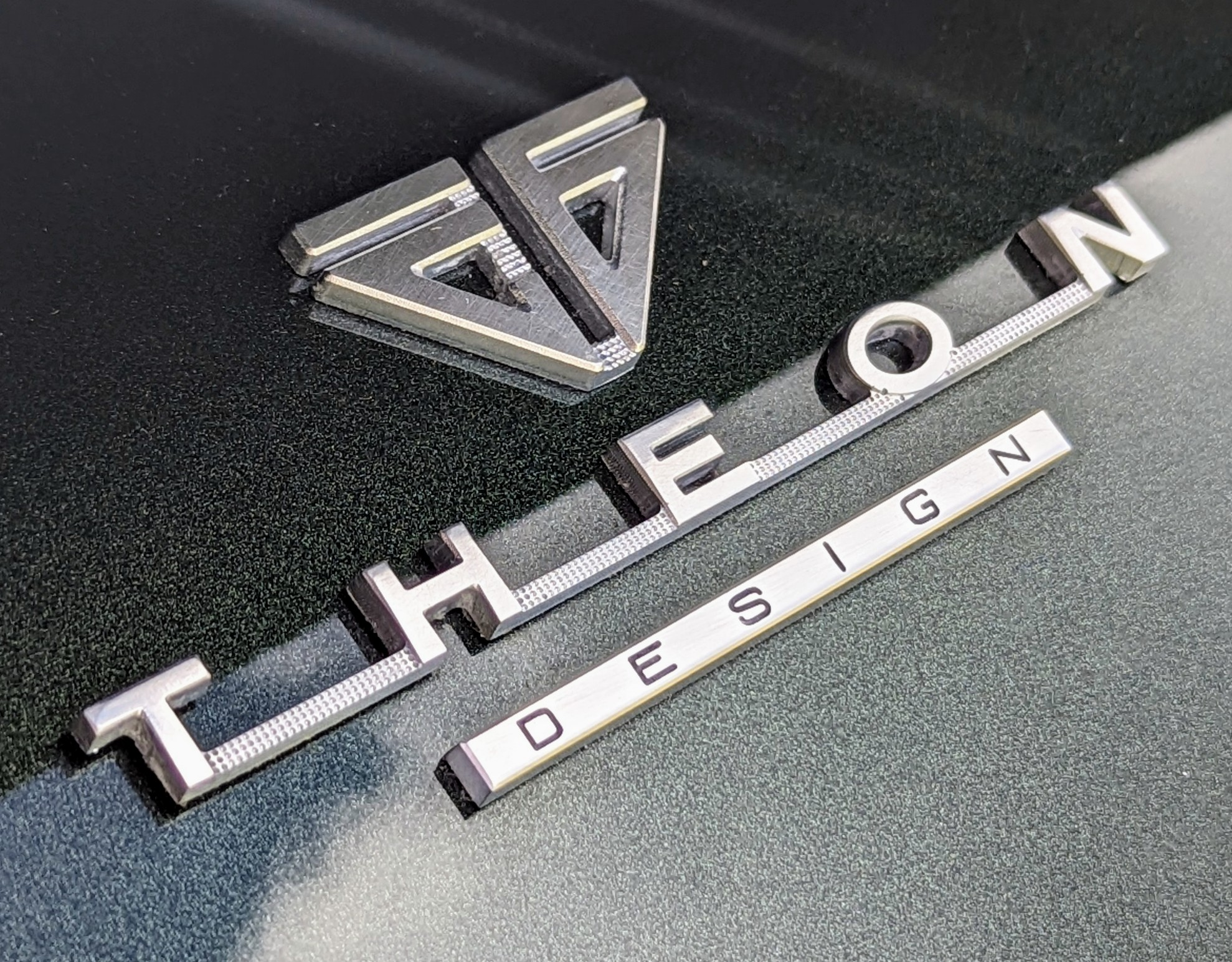
Theon Design badge on a Porsche 911

Theon Design is a British restomod workshop in Deddington which creates bespoke versions of Porsche 911 cars from the 964 series.

The company is owned by husband and wife Lucinda Argy and Adam Hawley and named after their son, Theo. They incorporated it in 2016 after Hawley, formerly a car designer, modified his own Porsche 911, which became the prototype; they sold the car for start-up financing.

Theon works solely on Porsche 964 cars: the version of the 911 built from 1989 to 1994. A team of mechanics modify the cars to owners' specifications in a converted barn in Deddington. Modifications can include design features from other 911 series as well as the owner's choice of engine and gearbox, modern features such as reversing cameras, and on request, replacement of the body steel with carbon fibre. Each car requires approximately 6,000 hours of labour over approximately 18 months; the workshop produces very few cars a year, three in 2023. As of 2022, the company foresaw a total production of 25.

== See also ==
- Singer Vehicle Design
