= Theon of Smyrna =

2nd century Greek mathematician and philosopher

Theon of Smyrna (Greek: Θέων ὁ Σμυρναῖος Theon ho Smyrnaios, gen. Θέωνος Theonos; fl. 100 CE) was a Greek philosopher and mathematician, whose works were strongly influenced by the Pythagorean school of thought. His surviving On Mathematics Useful for the Understanding of Plato is an introductory survey of Greek mathematics.

== Life ==
Little is known about the life of Theon of Smyrna. A bust created at his death and dedicated by his son was discovered at Smyrna, and art historians date it to around 135 CE. Ptolemy refers several times in his Almagest to a Theon who made observations at Alexandria, but it is uncertain whether he is referring to Theon of Smyrna. The lunar impact crater Theon Senior is named for him.

== Works ==
Theon wrote several commentaries on the works of mathematicians and philosophers of the time, including works on the philosophy of Plato. Most of these works are lost. The one major survivor is his On Mathematics Useful for the Understanding of Plato. A second work concerning the order in which to study Plato's works has recently been discovered in an Arabic translation.

=== On Mathematics Useful for the Understanding of Plato ===
The theorem of Theon of Smyrna states that the sum of two consecutive triangle numbers is a square.

His On Mathematics Useful for the Understanding of Plato is not a commentary on Plato's writings but rather a general handbook for a student of mathematics. It is not so much a groundbreaking work as a reference work of ideas already known at the time. Its status as a compilation of already-established knowledge and its thorough citation of earlier sources are part of what makes it valuable.

The first part of this work is divided into two parts, the first covering the subjects of numbers and the second dealing with music and harmony. The first section, on mathematics, is most focused on what today is most commonly known as number theory: odd numbers, even numbers, prime numbers, perfect numbers, abundant numbers, and other such properties. It contains an account of 'side and diameter numbers', the Pythagorean method for a sequence of best rational approximations to the square root of 2, the denominators of which are Pell numbers. It is also one of the sources of our knowledge of the origins of the classical problem of Doubling the cube.

The second section, on music, is split into three parts: music of numbers (hē en arithmois mousikē), instrumental music (hē en organois mousikē), and "music of the spheres" (hē en kosmō harmonia kai hē en toutō harmonia). The "music of numbers" is a treatment of temperament and harmony using ratios, proportions, and means; the sections on instrumental music concern themselves not with melody but rather with intervals and consonances in the manner of Pythagoras' work. Theon considers intervals by their degree of consonance: that is, by how simple their ratios are. (For example, the octave is first, with the simple 2:1 ratio of the octave to the fundamental.) He also considers them by their distance from one another.

The third section, on the music of the cosmos, he considered most important, and ordered it so as to come after the necessary background given in the earlier parts. Theon quotes a poem by Alexander of Ephesus that assigns specific pitches in the chromatic scale to each planet, an idea that would remain popular for a millennium thereafter.

The second book is on astronomy. Here, Theon affirms the spherical shape and large size of the Earth; he also describes the occultations, transits, conjunctions, and eclipses. However, the quality of the work led Otto Neugebauer to criticize him for not fully understanding the material he presented.

=== On Pythagorean Harmony ===
Theon was a great philosopher of harmony, and he discusses semitones in his treatise. There are several semitones used in Greek music, but two are particularly common. The "diatonic semitone" with a value of 16/15 and the “chromatic semitone” with a value of 25/24 are the two most commonly used semitones (Papadopoulos, 2002). In these times, Pythagoreans did not rely on irrational numbers to understand harmony, and the logarithmic scale for these semitones did not align with their philosophy. Their logarithms did not lead to irrational numbers; however, Theon tackled this discussion head-on. He acknowledged that “one can prove that” the tone of value 9/8 cannot be divided into equal parts, and so it is a number in itself. Many Pythagoreans believed in the existence of irrational numbers, but did not believe in using them because they were unnatural and not positive integers. Theon also does an amazing job of relating quotients of integers to musical intervals. He illustrates this idea in his writings and through experiments. He discusses the Pythagoreans' method of examining harmonies and consonances using half-filled vases and explains these experiments in greater depth, noting that the octaves, fifths, and fourths correspond, respectively, to the ratios 2/1, 3/2, and 4/3. His contributions significantly advanced the fields of music and physics (Papadopoulos, 2002).

== See also ==
- Theon of Alexandria

== Bibliography ==
- Theon of Smyrna: Mathematics useful for understanding Plato; translated from the 1892 Greek/French edition of J. Dupuis by Robert and Deborah Lawlor and edited and annotated by Christos Toulis and others; with an appendix of notes by Dupuis, a copious glossary, index of works, etc. Series: Secret doctrine reference series, San Diego : Wizards Bookshelf, 1979. ISBN 0-913510-24-6. 174pp.
- E.Hiller, Theonis Smyrnaei: expositio rerum mathematicarum ad legendum Platonem utilium, Leipzig:Teubner, 1878, repr. 1966.
- J. Dupuis, Exposition des connaissances mathématiques utiles pour la lecture de Platon, 1892. French translation.
- Lukas Richter:"Theon of Smyrna". Grove Music Online, ed. L. Macy. Accessed 29 Jun 05. (subscription access)
- O'Connor, John J.; Robertson, Edmund F., "Theon of Smyrna", MacTutor History of Mathematics Archive, University of St Andrews
- Papadopoulos, Athanase (2002). Mathematics and music theory: From Pythagoras to Rameau. The Mathematical Intelligencer, 24(1), 65–73. doi:10.1007/bf03025314
