= 8888 Uprising =

1988 protests in Burma (Myanmar)

- Part of the Myanmar conflict
- 1st row: Protesters gathering at Sule Pagoda in central Rangoon.; 2nd row: Protesters rallying in Mandalay; Aung San Suu Kyi addresses half a million protesters in central Rangoon.; 3rd row: Soldiers preparing to open fire on protesters; Saw Lwin and Win Zaw carrying a critically wounded school girl (Win Maw Oo).
- Date: 12 March – 21 September 1988 (6 months, 1 week and 2 days)
- Location: Burma (nationwide)
- Caused by: Withdrawal of currency notes without compensation; Economic mismanagement; Failure of the Burmese Way to Socialism; Police brutality; Corruption; Totalitarian one-party rule of Ne Win and his Burma Socialist Programme Party
- Goals: Multi-party federal liberal democracy in Burma and the resignation of Ne Win
- Methods: Civil disobedience; Civil resistance; Demonstrations; Riots; Strike actions
- Result: Military coup d'état on 18 September 1988; demonstrations suppressed by force
- Concessions: Dissolution of the Socialist Republic of the Union of Burma; Elections for a constitutional committee to draft a new constitution (results were not honoured)

Parties
Opposition: Pro-democracy protesters; Students; Trade unions; Supported by: Communist Party of Burma	Government: Burma Socialist Programme Party (until 18 September); State Law and Order Restoration Council (from 18 September); Tatmadaw; Burma Police Force

Lead figures
Aung San Suu Kyi	Ne Win; Saw Maung

Number
1 million protesters in Yangon; 500,000 in Shwedagon Pagoda; 500,000 in Downtown Yangon; 100,000 in Mandalay; 50,000 in Sittwe; Unknown number of others countrywide	

Casualties
- Deaths: 350 (official count); 3,000–10,000 (estimates)
- Injuries: Unknown
- Arrested: Unknown

The 8888 Uprising, (Note: Burmese: ၈၈၈၈ အရေးအခင်း or ရှစ်လေးလုံးအရေးအခင်း) also known as the 1988 Uprising, (Note: Burmese: ၁၉၈၈ အရေးအခင်း) was a series of nationwide protests, marches, and riots in Burma (present-day Myanmar) that peaked in August 1988. Key events occurred on 8 August 1988 and therefore it is commonly known as the "8888 Uprising". The protests began as a student movement and were organised largely by university students at the Rangoon Arts and Sciences University and the Rangoon Institute of Technology.

Since the 1962 military coup, the Burma Socialist Programme Party had ruled the country as a totalitarian one-party state, headed by General Ne Win. Under the government agenda, called the Burmese Way to Socialism, which involved economic isolation and the strengthening of the military, Burma became one of the world's most impoverished countries. Many firms in the formal sector of the economy were nationalised, and the government combined Soviet-style central planning with Buddhist and traditional beliefs and superstition.

The 8888 uprising was started by students in Yangon (Rangoon) on 8 August 1988. Student protests spread throughout the country. Hundreds of thousands of monks, children, university students, housewives, doctors and common people protested against the government. The uprising ended on 18 September after a bloody military coup by the State Law and Order Restoration Council. Thousands of deaths have been attributed to the military during this uprising, while authorities in Burma put the figure at around 350 people killed.

During the crisis, Aung San Suu Kyi emerged as a national icon. When the military junta arranged an election in 1990, her party, the National League for Democracy, won 81% of the seats in the government (392 out of 492). However, the military junta refused to recognise the results and continued to rule the country as the State Law and Order Restoration Council. Aung San Suu Kyi was also placed under house arrest. The State Law and Order Restoration Council would be a cosmetic change from the Burma Socialist Programme Party. Suu Kyi's house arrest was lifted in 2010, when worldwide attention for her peaked again during the making of the biographical film The Lady. The Tatmadaw (Myanmar Armed Forces) again seized control of the country in the 2021 Myanmar coup d'état, which began with the imprisonment of then State Counsellor Aung San Suu Kyi. The coup has led to numerous protests and demonstrations against the military-led government. Activists have compared the current coup resistance movement to the 8888 Uprising.

== Background ==
=== Economic problems ===
Before the crisis, Burma had been ruled by the repressive and isolated regime of General Ne Win since 1962. The country had a national debt of $3.5 billion and currency reserves of between $20 million and $35 million, with debt service ratios standing at half of the national budget. One reason for the deficit came from the government's spending on the military against Communist and ethnic insurgents. This spending amounted to 40% of the national budget, while these insurgents denied the government access to mineral-rich parts of the country.

==== 1985 and 1987 demonetisation crises ====
In the years leading up to the crisis, General Ne Win had imposed two instances of sudden currency demonetisation that declared certain circulated denominations of currency invalid. These instances led to instantaneous loss of savings for many Burmese citizens and economic instability. On 3 November 1985, the Burmese government declared notes of 20, 50, and 100 kyats invalid, without prior warning to the public. Prior to this, circulated denominations were of 1, 5, 10, 20, 50, and 100 kyats. The stated reason for the demonetisation was to combat black market activity. The public was given only a short period of time to exchange their 20, 50, and 100 kyat bills, and only 25% of the value of surrendered bills were reimbursed. On 10 November 1985, a week after the initial announcement of demonetisation, new denominations of 25, 35, and 75 kyat bills were announced, with the 75 kyat denomination chosen to commemorate Ne Win's 75th birthday. In November 1985, students gathered and boycotted the government's decision to withdraw Burmese local currency notes. Economic problems coupled with counter-insurgency required continuous involvement in the international market.

On 5 September 1987, Ne Win announced the demonetisation of the 25, 35, and 75 kyat notes, leaving only the 1, 5, and 10 kyat bills valid. This announcement was also with no prior warning, and this time no exchange for valid tender was allowed. Roughly 60–80% of circulated legal tender was declared invalid without warning, and millions of Burmese citizens had their savings eliminated by this action. On 22 September 1987, the Burmese government introduced new denominations of 45 and 90 kyat notes. The 45 and 90 kyat denominations were chosen because the two numbers are divisible by 9, which was considered lucky by Ne Win.

Students in particular were angry at the 1987 demonetisation as savings for tuition fees were wiped out instantly. Students from the Rangoon Institute of Technology (RIT) rioted throughout Rangoon, smashing windows and traffic lights down Insein Road, and universities in Rangoon temporarily closed. The government later allowed for reimbursement of up to 100 kyat so that students could return home instead of rioting in the cities. With the re-opening of schools in late October 1987, underground groups in Rangoon and Mandalay produced dissident leaflets which culminated in bombs exploding in November. Police later received threatening letters from underground groups, who organised small protests around the university campus. Meanwhile, larger protests in Mandalay involved monks and workers, with some burning government buildings and state businesses. Burmese state media reported little on the protests, but information quickly spread through the students.

=== Early democracy protests ===
After receiving Least Developed Country status from the United Nations Economic and Social Council (ECOSOC) in December 1987, government policy requiring farmers to sell produce below market rates to create greater revenue for the government sparked several, violent rural protests. The protests were fanned by public letters to Ne Win by former second in command Brigadier General Aung Gyi from July 1987, reminding him of the 1967 riots and condemning lack of economic reform, describing Burma as "almost a joke" compared to other Southeast Asian nations. He was later arrested.

On 12 March 1988, students from the Rangoon Institute of Technology (RIT) were arguing with out-of-school youths inside the Sanda Win tea shop about music playing on a sound system. A drunken youth would not return a tape that the RIT students favoured. A brawl followed in which one youth, who was the son of a Burma Socialist Programme Party (BSPP) official, was arrested and later released for injuring a student. Students protested at a local police department where 500 riot police were mobilised and in the ensuing clash, one student, Phone Maw, was shot and killed. The incident angered pro-democracy groups and the next day more students rallied at the RIT and spread to other campuses. The students, who had never protested before, increasingly saw themselves as activists. There was growing resentment towards military rule and there were no channels to address grievances, further exacerbated by police brutality, economic mismanagement, and corruption within the government.

By mid-March, several protests had occurred and there was open dissent in the army. Various demonstrations were broken up by using tear gas canisters to disperse crowds. On 16 March, students demanding an end to one party rule marched towards soldiers at Inya Lake when riot police stormed from the rear, clubbing several students to death and raping others. Several students recalled the police shouting, "Don't let them escape" and "Kill them!".

On 28 March, the Communist Party of Burma issued a statement in support of the protests, calling for the creation of a provisional government that would unite the revolutionaries and protestors of Burma.

=== Ne Win resigns ===
Following the latest protests, authorities announced the closure of universities for several months. By June 1988, large demonstrations of students and sympathisers were a daily sight. Many students, sympathisers and riot police died throughout the month as the protests spread throughout Burma from Rangoon. Largescale protests were reported in Pegu, Mandalay, Tavoy, Toungoo, Sittwe, Pakokku, Mergui, Minbu and Myitkyina. Demonstrators in larger numbers demanded multi-party democracy, which marked Ne Win's resignation on 23 July 1988. In a valedictory address given that day, Ne Win affirmed that "When the army shoots, it shoots to kill." He also promised a multi-party system, but he appointed the largely disliked Sein Lwin, known as the "Butcher of Rangoon" to head a new government.

== Main protests ==
=== 1–7 August ===
A red flag depicting a fighting peacock became a symbol of the protests on the streets of Burma.

Protests reached their peak in August 1988. Students planned for a nationwide demonstration on 8 August 1988, an auspicious date based on numerological significance. News of the protest reached rural areas and four days prior to the national protest, students across the country were denouncing Sein Lwin's regime and Tatmadaw troops were being mobilised. Pamphlets and posters appeared on the streets of Rangoon bearing the fighting peacock insignia of the All-Burma Students Union. Neighbourhood and strike committees were openly formed on the advice of underground activists, many of which were influenced by similar underground movements by workers and monks in the 1980s. Between 2 and 10 August, co-ordinated protests were occurring in most Burmese towns.

In the first few days of the Rangoon protests, activists contacted lawyers and monks in Mandalay to encourage them to take part in the protests. The students were quickly joined by Burmese citizens from all walks of life, including government workers, Buddhist monks, air force and navy personnel, customs officers, teachers and hospital staff. The demonstrations in the streets of Rangoon became a focal point for other demonstrations, which spread to other states' capitals. Upwards of 10,000 protesters demonstrated outside the Sule Pagoda in Rangoon, where demonstrators burned and buried effigies of Ne Win and Sein Lwin in coffins decorated with demonetised bank notes. Further protests took place around the country at stadiums and hospitals. Monks at the Sule Pagoda reported that the Buddha's image had changed shape, with an image in the sky standing on its head. On 3 August, the authorities imposed martial law from 8 pm to 4 am and a ban on gatherings of more than five people.

=== 8–12 August ===
Across Burma, people poured out in thousands to join the protests – not just students but also teachers, monks, children, professionals, and trade unionists of every shade. It was on this day, too, that the junta made its first determined attempt at repression. Soldiers opened fire on the demonstrators and hundreds of unarmed marchers were killed. The killings continued for a week, but still the demonstrators continued to flood the streets.

— Amitav Ghosh (2001)

A general strike, as planned, began on 8 August 1988. Mass demonstrations were held across Burma as ethnic minorities, Buddhists, Christians, Muslims, students, workers and the young and old all demonstrated. The first procession circled Rangoon, stopping for people to speak. A stage was also erected. Demonstrators from the Rangoon neighbourhoods converged in downtown Rangoon. Only one casualty was reported at this point as a frightened traffic policeman fired into the crowd and fled. (Such marches would occur daily until 19 September.) Protesters kissed the shoes of soldiers, in an attempt to persuade them to join the civilian protest, whilst some encircled military officers to protect them from the crowd and earlier violence Over the next four days these demonstrations continued; the government was surprised by the scale of the protests and stated that it promised to heed the demands of the protesters "insofar as possible". Lwin had brought in more soldiers from insurgent areas to deal with the protesters.

In Mandalay Division, a more organised strike committee was headed by lawyers and discussion focused on multi-party democracy and human rights. Many participants in the protests arrived from nearby towns and villages. Farmers who were particularly angry with the government's economic policies joined the protests in Rangoon. In one village, 2,000 of the 5,000 people also went on strike.

A short while later, the authorities opened fire on the protesters. Ne Win ordered that "guns were not to shoot upwards", meaning that he was ordering the military to shoot directly at the demonstrators. Protesters responded by throwing Molotov cocktails, swords, knives, rocks, poisoned darts and bicycle spokes. In one incident, protesters burned a police station and tore apart four fleeing officers. On 10 August, soldiers fired into Rangoon General Hospital, killing nurses and doctors tending to the wounded. State-run Radio Rangoon reported that 1,451 "looters and disturbance makers" had been arrested.

While estimates of the number of casualties surrounding the 8-8-88 demonstrations range from hundreds to 10,000; military authorities put the figures at about 95 people killed and 240 wounded.

=== 13–31 August ===
Lwin's sudden and unexplained resignation on 12 August left many protestors confused and jubilant. Security forces exercised greater caution with demonstrators, particularly in neighbourhoods that were entirely controlled by demonstrators and committees. On 19 August, under pressure to form a civilian government, Ne Win's biographer, Maung Maung, was appointed as head of government. Maung was a legal scholar and the only non-military individual to serve in the Burma Socialist Programme Party (BSPP). The appointment of Maung briefly resulted in a subsidence of the shooting and protests.

Nationwide demonstrations resumed on 22 August 1988. In Mandalay, 100,000 people protested, including Buddhist monks and 50,000 demonstrated in Sittwe. Large marches took places from Taunggyi and Moulmein to distant ethnic states (particularly where military campaigns had previously taken place), where red, the symbolic colour for democracy was displayed on banners. Two days later, doctors, monks, musicians, actors, lawyers, army veterans and government office workers joined the protests. It became difficult for committees to control the protests. During this time, demonstrators became increasingly wary of "suspicious looking" people and police and army officers. On one occasion, a local committee mistakenly beheaded a couple thought to have been carrying a bomb. Incidents like these were not as common in Mandalay, where protests were more peaceful as they were organised by monks and lawyers.

On 26 August, Aung San Suu Kyi, who had watched the demonstrations from her mother's bedside, entered the political arena by addressing half a million people at Shwedagon Pagoda. It was at this point that she became a symbol for the struggle in Burma, particularly in the eyes of the Western world. Suu Kyi, as the daughter of Aung San, who led the independence movement, appeared ready to lead the movement for democracy.. Regarding the quote attributed to her father, "the armed forces are meant for this nation and people... if instead the armed forces should come to be hated by the people, then the aims with which this army has been built up would have been in vain," she publicly stated her commitment to preventing any conflict between the people and the armed forces. At this point in time for many in Burma, the uprising was seen as similar to that of the People Power Revolution in the Philippines in 1986.

On 28 August, the Communist Party of Burma became the first of active insurgent forces in the country to comment on the revolution, where it identified itself with the goal of the 8888 Uprising and congratulated the students and people for their victories. Though the Communist Party did not lead the uprising, some demonstrations in Rangoon and Mandalay had come under the influence of the communists, primarily a CPB cell named '4828 Regional Committee' and various communist guerrillas who had surrendered before the uprising.

Around this time, former Prime Minister U Nu and retired Brigadier General Aung Gyi also re-emerged onto the political scene in what was described as a "democracy summer" when many former democracy leaders returned. Despite the gains made by the democracy movement, Ne Win remained in the background.

=== September ===
A rival government was formed by U Nu on 9 September with him as prime minister. However, this move was not co-ordinated with other parts of the uprising, and thus resulted in condemnations and a widening split in the opposition who viewed U Nu's move as opportunism.

During the September congress of 1988, 90% of party delegates (968 out of 1080) voted for a multi-party system of government. The Burma Socialist Programme Party (BSPP) announced they would be organising an election, but the opposition parties called for their immediate resignation from government, allowing an interim government to organise elections. After the BSPP rejected both demands, protesters again took to the streets on 12 September 1988. Nu promised elections within a month, proclaiming a provisional government. Meanwhile, the police and army began fraternising with the protesters. The movement had reached an impasse relying on three hopes: daily demonstrations to force the regime to respond to their demands, encouraging soldiers to defect and appealing to an international audience in the hope that United Nations or United States troops would arrive. Some Tatmadaw did defect, but only in limited numbers, mostly from the Navy. Stephen Solarz who had experienced the recent democracy protests in the Philippines and South Korea arrived in Burma in September encouraging the regime to reform, which echoed the policy of the United States government towards Burma.

By mid-September, the protests grew more violent and lawless, with soldiers deliberately leading protesters into skirmishes that the army easily won. Protesters demanded more immediate change, and distrusted steps for incremental reform. On 17 September, dozens of activists and monks occupied the Ministry of Trade building and seized the weapons of its security personnel. On the same day, the Communist Party of Burma issued a call for a ceasefire, overthrow of the BSPP, multi-party elections, and talks with opposition parties, which was welcomed by veteran communists and the left-wing leaders of the uprising.

The army had by this point already been planning a repression of the uprising, but was incensed to do so as young military personnel began to take part in the uprising, some of whom had established contacts at the Rangoon Worker's College, where a very militant Student Union had taken control. Furthermore, students and rank-and-file members of the opposition were angered by the failure of the opposition's leadership to form an interim government. Thus, radical activists within the All Burma Student's Federation called for a meeting on 18 September to create a parallel government composed of strike-committees and worker's unions.

== SLORC coup and crackdown ==
1988 Burmese coup d'état
- Date: 18 September 1988
- Location: Rangoon, Burma (present-day Yangon, Myanmar)
- Type: Military coup
- Cause: 8888 Uprising
- Motive: Regime change
- Organised by: General Saw Maung
- Participants: Tatmadaw
- Outcome: Formation of a military junta, the State Law and Order Restoration Council (SLORC): Abolition of the 1974 constitution; Abolishment of all organs of state power that were formed under the 1974 constitution

If the military shoots, it has no tradition of shooting into the air. It shoots straight to kill.

— Ne Win

On 18 September 1988, the military retook power in the country. General Saw Maung repealed the 1974 constitution and established the State Law and Order Restoration Council (SLORC), "imposing more draconian measures than Ne Win had imposed." After Maung had imposed martial law, the protests were violently broken up. The government announced on the state-run radio that the military had assumed power in the people's interest, "in order to bring a timely halt to the deteriorating conditions on all sides all over the country". Tatmadaw troops went through cities throughout Burma, indiscriminately firing on protestors.

Although an exact body count has not been determined as bodies were often cremated, it is estimated that within the first week of securing power, 1,000 students, monks, and schoolchildren were killed, and another 500 were killed whilst protesting outside the United States embassy – footage caught by a cameraman nearby who distributed the footage to the world's media. Maung described the dead as "looters". Protestors were also pursued into the jungle and some students took up training on the country's borders with Thailand.

"I would like every country in the world to recognize the fact that the people of Burma are being shot down for no reason at all."

— Aung San Suu Kyi, 22 September 1988

By the end of September, there were around 3,000 estimated deaths and unknown number of injured, with 1,000 deaths in Rangoon alone. At this point in time, Aung San Suu Kyi appealed for help. On 21 September, the government had regained control of the country, with the movement effectively collapsing in October. By the end of 1988, it was estimated that 10,000 people, including protesters and soldiers, had been killed.

== Aftermath ==
Many in Burma believed that the regime would have collapsed if the United Nations and neighbouring countries had refused to recognise the legitimacy of the coup. Western governments and Japan cut aid to the country. Among Burma's neighbours, India was most critical; condemning the suppression, closing borders and setting up refugee camps along its border with Burma. By 1989, 6,000 NLD supporters had been detained and those who fled to the ethnic border areas, such as Kawthoolei, formed groups with those who sought greater self-determination. It was estimated 10,000 had fled to mountains which were controlled by ethnic insurgents such as the Karen National Liberation Army (KNLA), and many of them later trained to become soldiers. Of these 10,000, most fled to land held by the NDF, though some also joined CPB territory in the Shan area.

These revolutionaries who fled to the countryside to fight led to the intensification of insurgency. These offensives followed common bouts of fighting that emerged in the countries rainy season. Of the battles that followed the suppression of the 8888 Uprising, the three largest came from first the Communist Party of Burma's seizure of the town of Mong Yang with a 1,500 strong force on the 25th of September, while the Kachin Independence Organisation seized the road connecting Bhamo to Myitkyina, while the Karen National Union sezied the strategic outpost of Mae Tah Waw on the Thai border.

After the uprising, the SLORC waged a "clumsy propaganda" campaign against those who had organised the protests. Intelligence Chief General Khin Nyunt, held English-language press conferences which were aimed at giving foreign diplomats and the media a favourable account of the SLORC's response to the protests. During this period, more restrictions were imposed upon the Burmese media, denying it the relative freedom to report news which it had been able to exercise at the peak of the protests. In the conferences, he detailed a conspiracy in which the right was plotting to overthrow the regime with the assistance of "subversive foreigners" and a conspiracy in which the left was plotting to overthrow the State. Despite the conferences, few believed the government's version of events. While these conferences were going on, the SLORC was secretly negotiating with mutineers.

Between 1988 and 2000, the Burmese government established 20 museums which detailed the military's central role throughout Burma's history and the size of the military increased from 180,000 to 400,000. The Burmese government also kept schools and universities closed in order to prevent future uprisings. Initially, Aung San Suu Kyi, U Tin Oo and Aung Gyi publicly rejected the SLORC's offer to hold elections the following year, claiming that they could not be freely held while Burma was under military rule.

== Significance ==
Today, the uprising is commemorated by Burmese expatriates and citizens. In Thailand, students also commemorate the uprising every 8 August. On the 20th anniversary of the uprising, 48 activists were arrested for commemorating the event in Burma. The event garnered much support for the Burmese people internationally. Poems were written by students who participated in the protests. The 1995 film Beyond Rangoon is a fictionalized drama which is based on the events that took place during the uprising.

The uprising led to the death and imprisonment of thousands of individuals. Many of the deaths occurred inside the prisons, where prisoners of conscience were subjected to inhumane torture and deprived of basic provisions, such as food, water, medicine, and sanitation. From 1988 to 2012, the military and the police illegally detained and imprisoned tens of thousands of leaders of the Burmese pro-democracy movement, as well as intellectuals, artists, students, and human rights activists. Pyone Cho, one of the leaders of the uprising, spent 20 years of his adult life in prison. Ko Ko Gyi, another leader of the uprising, spent 18 years of his life in prison. Min Ko Naing was placed in solitary confinement for nine years for his role as a leader of the uprising. Because the uprising began as a student movement, many of the individuals who were arrested, imprisoned, tortured, and killed by the police and the military were high school and university students.

Many of the student leaders of the uprising became lifelong human rights activists and leaders of the Burmese pro-democracy movement. Nineteen years later, many of these same activists also played a role in the 2007 Saffron Revolution. The 88 Generation Students Group, which is named after the events of 8 August 1988, organised one of the first protests which eventually culminated in the Saffron Revolution. But prior to the outbreak of large-scale demonstrations, its members were arrested and given lengthy prison sentences of up to 65 years. The activists who were arrested included prominent individuals such as Min Ko Naing, Mya Aye, Htay Kywe, Mie Mie, Ko Ko Gyi, Pyone Cho, Min Zeyar, Ant Bwe Kyaw, and Nilar Thein. Though not an 88 Generation Students Group member, a solo protester Ohn Than also joined the demonstration. All of them were released in a general amnesty in 2012. They continue to work as politicians and human rights activists in Myanmar. They also campaigned for the National League for Democracy (NLD) in the 2015 general election. Pyone Cho, one of the main leaders of the 88 Generation, was elected to the House of Representatives in the 2015 Election.

== Gallery ==
Burma Navy personnel demonstrating

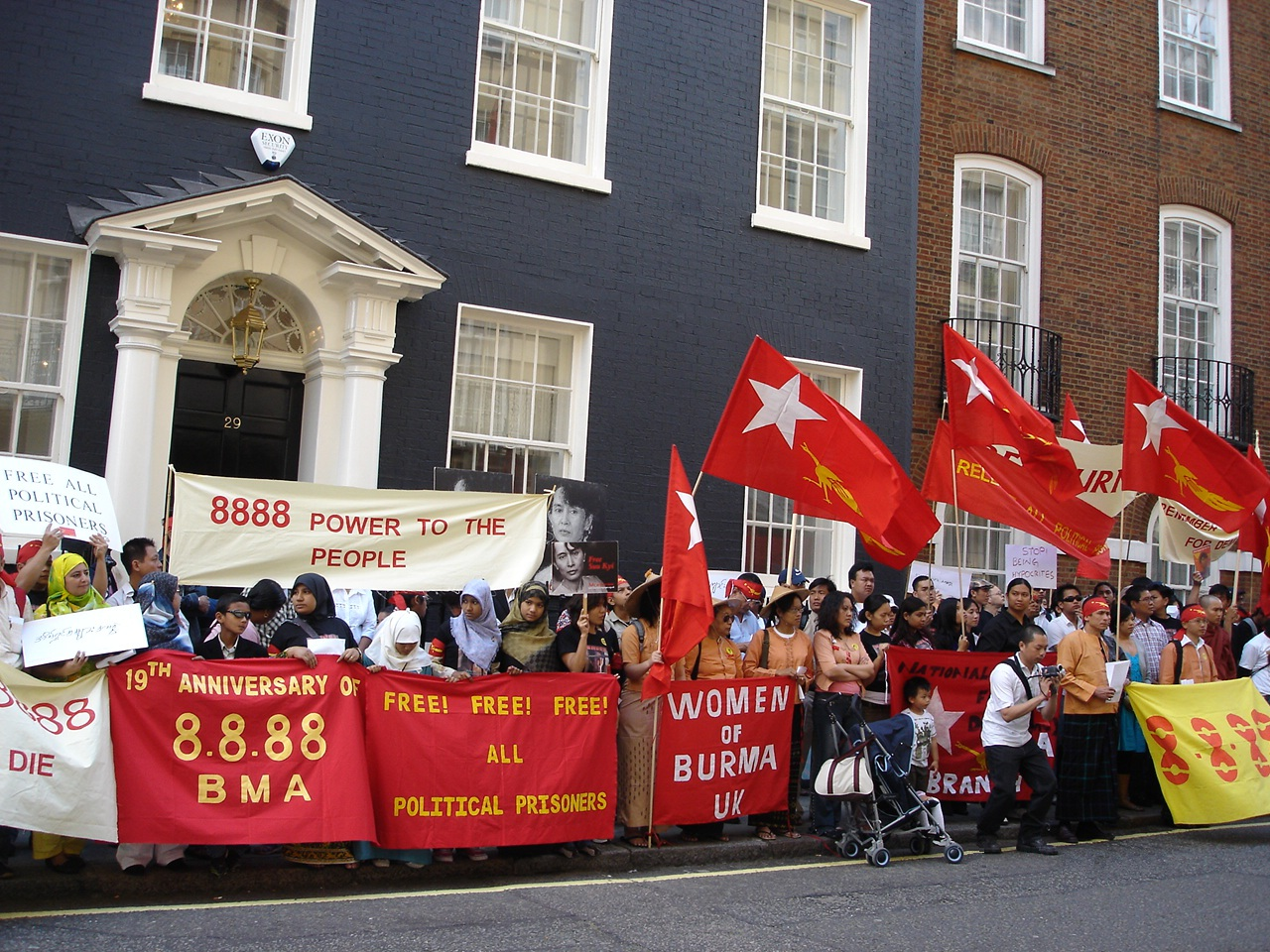
Demonstration held on the 19th anniversary of the 8888 Uprising

== See also ==
- All Burma Students' Democratic Front
- Depayin massacre
- Death of Ko Par Gyi
