= Thone =

Thone may refer to one of the following.

- Thone River in New South Wales, Australia
- Mount Thone, today Tuna el-Gebel

== People with the surname ==
- Charles Thone (1924-2018), American politician
- Frank Thone (1891-1949), American science writer
- Wilhelm Thöne (1893–1974), German World War I flying ace

== See also ==
- Thônes, a commune in Haute-Savoie department, Rhône-Alpes region, France
- Thoen (disambiguation)
- Thony (name)
- Tone (disambiguation)
