= Thom =

The surname Thom is of Scottish origin, from the city of Aberdeen, Aberdeenshire and Angus, and is a sept of the Clan MacThomas.

Thom is also a first-name variant of the abbreviation "Tom" of "Thomas" that holds the "h".

== People with the surname ==
- Alexander Thom (disambiguation)
- Andreas Thom (born 1965), former German football player
- Bing Thom (1940-2016), Canadian architect
- Cameron E. Thom (1825–1915), early settler in California, Confederate officer and lawyer
- Charles Thom (1872–1956), US microbiologist and mycologist with the standard author abbreviation "Thom"
- Cristy Thom (born 1971), American model, actress and artist
- Françoise Thom (born 1951), French historian and Sovietologist
- Graeme Thom (born 1967), Zimbabwean cricketer
- H. B. Thom (c. 1905–1983), South African rector and Chancellor of the Stellenbosch University
- James Thom (disambiguation)
- Jess Thom (born 1980), English comedian
- John Thom (soldier) (1891–1941), British lieutenant-colonel, judge and politician
- John Hamilton Thom (1808–1894), Irish Unitarian minister
- John Nichols Thom (1799–1838), Cornish wine-merchant and maltster
- John Watson Triplett Thom (1769–1855), American planter and politician
- Joseph Pembroke Thom (1828–1899), American politician and physician
- Karl Thom (1893-1945), German flying ace
- Linda Thom (born 1943), Canadian Olympic gold medal-winning shooter
- Margaret Thom, Commissioner of the Northwest Territories, Canada, 2017–2024
- Randy Thom (born 1951), American sound design
- Pembroke Lea Thom (died 1901), American politician from Maryland
- René Thom (1923–2002), French mathematician
- Robert Thom (engineer) (1774–1847), Scottish hydraulic engineer
- Robert Thom (disambiguation)
- Ronald Thom (1923–1986), Canadian architect
- Sandi Thom (b. 1981), Scottish singer-songwriter
- William Thom (disambiguation)

== People with the nickname or given name ==
- Thom Andersen (born 1943), American filmmaker, film critic and teacher
- Thom Adcox-Hernandez (born 1960), American actor
- Thom Barry, American actor
- Thomas Thom Bell (1943-2022), Jamaican-born American songwriter, arranger and producer, one of the creators of the Philadelphia style of soul music
- Thomas Thom Brennaman (born 1963), American sportscaster
- Thom Bresh, (1948-2022), American country singer and guitarist
- Thom Browne (born 1965), American fashion designer
- Thom Christopher (1940-2024), American actor
- Thomas Thom Darden (born 1950), American retired National Football League player
- Thomas Thom Dornbrook (born 1956), American retired National Football League player
- Thom Eberhardt (born 1947), American film director, producer and screenwriter
- Thom Evans (born 1985), Scottish former international rugby union player
- Thomas Thom Fitzgerald (born 1968), American-Canadian film and theatre director, screenwriter, playwright and producer
- Thom Flodqvist (born 1990), Swedish professional ice hockey player
- Thomas Thom Gimbel, (born 1959) American musician best known as a member of the rock band Foreigner
- Thomas Thom de Graaf (born 1957), Dutch jurist and politician, former Deputy Prime Minister (2003-2005)
- Thomson Thom Gunn (1929–2004), English poet
- Thomas Thom Hartmann (born 1951), American radio host, author, former psychotherapist, entrepreneur and political commentator
- Thom Haye (born 1995), Dutch-born Indonesian footballer
- Thom Jones (1945–2016), American writer, primarily of short stories
- Thomas Thom Mathews (born 1958), American actor
- Thom Michael Mulligan, American actor
- Thom Noble (born 1936), British film editor
- Thom Racina, American television writer and novelist
- Thomas Thom Russo (born 1969), American record producer, engineer, mixer and songwriter
- Thomas Thom Schuyler (born 1952), American songwriter and singer
- Thomas Thom Tillis (born 1960), American politician, Senator from North Carolina
- Thomas Thom Yorke (born 1968), English musician, singer and principal songwriter of the alternative rock band Radiohead

== People with the stage name or pseudonym ==
- Thom Hell, Norwegian singer-songwriter Thomas Helland (born 1976)
- Thom Hoffman, Dutch actor and photographer Thomas Ancion (born 1957)

== Fictional characters ==
- Thom Kallor, a DC Comics superhero
- Thom Merrilin, a gleeman in Robert Jordan's book series The Wheel of Time
- Thom Pain, the titular protagonist of Will Eno's one-man play Thom Pain (based on nothing)
- Thom Rainier, from the Dragon Age video game series

== See also ==
- Blessed Gerard (c. 1040–1120), founder of the Knights Hospitaller, erroneously attributed with the surname Thom
- Thomsen, a Danish surname
- Thomson (surname)
- Thon (name)
- Thorn (surname)
