= James Thom =

James Thom may refer to:

- James Thom (sculptor) (1802–1850), Scottish sculptor
- James Alexander Thom (born 1933), American writer
- J. C. Thom (1835–1898), American painter, son of sculptor James Thom
- Norman Thom (James Norman Thom, 1899–1987), Australian politician
