= Flodqvist =

Flodqvist is a Swedish surname. Notable people with the surname include:

- Anders Flodqvist (born 1959), Swedish water polo player
- Thord Flodqvist (1926–1988), Swedish ice hockey goaltender
- Thom Flodqvist (born 1990), Swedish ice hockey centre
