= Pembroke Lea Thom =

American politician (died 1901)

Member of the Maryland House of Delegates from the Baltimore district
- In office 1886–1886 Serving with Ludolph W. Gunther Jr., Timothy Hayes, C. Dodd McFarland, Patrick Reilly, Rodwell Turner
- Preceded by: Ludolph W. Gunther Jr., John H. Handy, Joshua Plaskitt, Charles Schultz, Charles J. Weiner, Joseph Pembroke Thom
- Succeeded by: Henry Bargar, George Colton, James William Denny, Charles D. Gaither, Patrick Reilly, Alexander H. Robertson

Personal details
- Born: 1859/1860
- Died: July 3, 1901 (aged 41) Baltimore, Maryland, U.S.
- Party: Democratic
- Spouse: Mary Isabel Rieman
- Children: 2
- Parent: Joseph Pembroke Thom (father)
- Relatives: John Watson Triplett Thom (grandson); Robert Wright (great-grandson); William Mayo (great-great-great grandson)
- Occupation: Politician

Pembroke Lea Thom (died July 3, 1901) was an American politician from Maryland. He served as a member of the Maryland House of Delegates, representing Baltimore in 1886.

== Early life and family ==
Pembroke Lea Thom was the son of Ella Lea (née Wright) and Joseph Pembroke Thom. He was the grandson of John Watson Triplett Thom, great-grandson of Maryland Governor Robert Wright and great-great-great-grandson of William Mayo. He attended Episcopal High School in Alexandria, Virginia, in 1874–1875.

== Career ==
Thom was a Democrat. He served as a member of the Maryland House of Delegates, representing Baltimore in 1886. He succeeded his father in office and helped pass a bill to establish a state hospital for children. He served as aide-de-camp of Governor Henry Lloyd up until January 11, 1888.

== Personal life ==
Thom married Mary Isabel Rieman and had two children.

Thom died on July 3, 1901, aged 41, at his home at 204 West Lanvale Street in Baltimore.
