= Henrietta Christian Wright =

American author

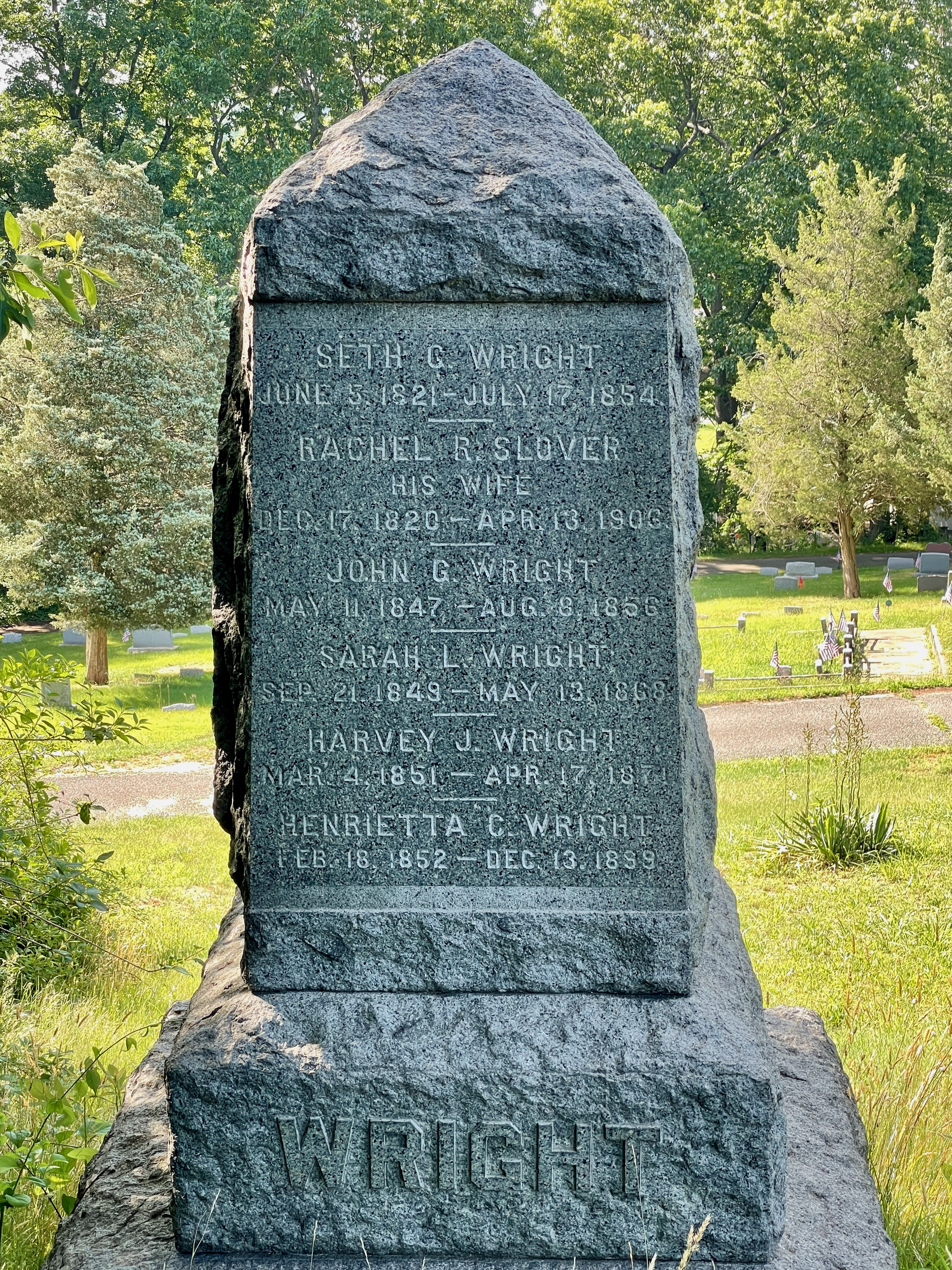
- Wright family monument at Chestnut Hill Cemetery
- Born: February 18, 1852; Old Bridge, New Jersey
- Died: December 13, 1899 (aged 47); Old Bridge, New Jersey
- Occupation: Author

Henrietta Christian Wright (February 18, 1852 – December 13, 1899) was an American children's author who resided in the Old Bridge section of East Brunswick, New Jersey. She is buried in the Chestnut Hill Cemetery.

== Publishing career ==
She wrote children's books on literature, history and science. One of her children's books, Children's Stories in American Literature: 1660-1860, covered the lives and works of such great authors as Edgar Allan Poe, William Bryant, Ralph Waldo Emerson, Henry Wadsworth Longfellow, James Russell Lowell, and Oliver Wendell Holmes. First published in 1861, this book was a part of the everyday schooling of young pre-teens. In 1883, the New York publisher White and Stokes published Little Folk in Green written by Wright and illustrated at the age of 16 by Miss Lydia Emmet (1866–1952), who went on to become a noted portrait artist. Wright also produced Children's Stories in English Literature from Taliesin to Shakespeare, in which she introduces traditional songs and literary work by Chaucer, Spenser, Philip Sidney, and Shakespeare with biographical and historic notes before re-telling their writings in language for children. It was published by Charles Scribner's Sons in 1889.

== Selected works ==
- Little Folk in Green: New Fairy Stories, New York : White and Stokes, 1882
- Children's Stories in American History, Charles Scribner's Sons, 1885
- The Princess Lilliwinkins and Other Stories, New York, Harper & brothers, 1889
- Children's Stories in English Literature from Shakespeare to Tennyson, 1891 C. Scribner's Sons, New York
- Children's Stories of the Great Scientists, New York, C. Scribner's sons, 1888, publ. 1894 Republished by Dodo Press, 2008, paperback
- Children's Stories in English Literature from Taliesin to Shakespeare, New York : Charles Scribner's Sons, 1889
- Children's Stories in American Literature: 1861–1896, Charles Scribner's Sons., New York, NY 1895 Republished by Arden Library, 1978
- American Men of Letters, 1660–1896, London, D. Nutt, 1897
- Children's Stories of American Progress, New York, C. Scribner's sons, ©1886, publ. 1914. Republished by Read Books, paperback, 2010
