= Joseph Pembroke Thom =

American politician and physician (1828–1899)

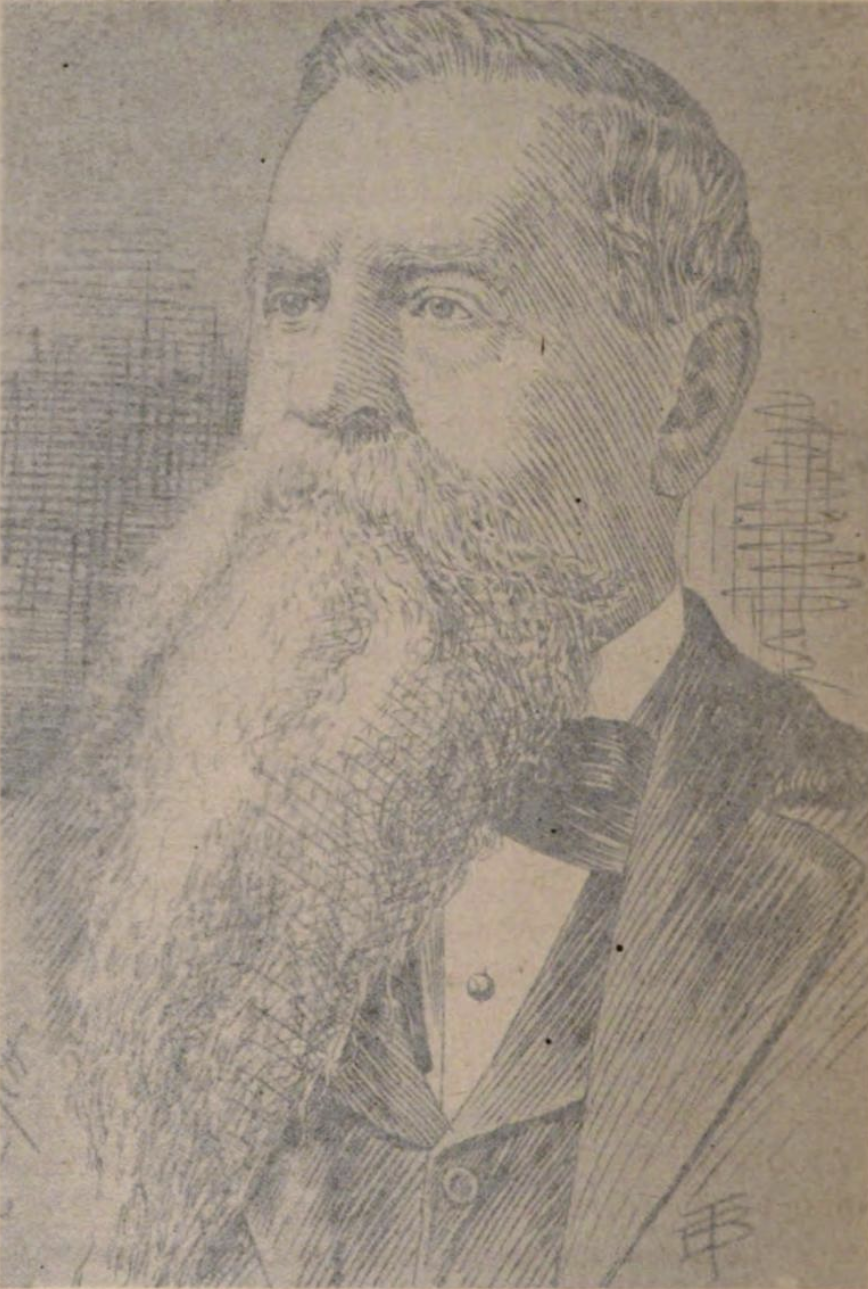
- Drawing of Thom in 1919 publication

Speaker of the Maryland House of Delegates
- In office 1884
- Preceded by: Otis Keilholtz
- Succeeded by: Joseph B. Seth

Member of the Maryland House of Delegates from the Baltimore district
- In office 1884–1884 Serving with Ludolph W. Gunther Jr., John H. Handy, Joshua Plaskitt, Charles Schultz, Charles J. Weiner
- Preceded by: Henry Duvall, Aquilla H. Greenfield, John H. Handy, Edward M. Kirkland, John A. Ostendorf, Patrick Reilly
- Succeeded by: Ludolph W. Gunther Jr., Timothy Hayes, C. Dodd McFarland, Patrick Reilly, Pembroke Lea Thom, Rodwell Turner

Personal details
- Born: March 13, 1828 Culpeper County, Virginia, U.S.
- Died: August 21, 1899 (aged 71) Baltimore, Maryland, U.S.
- Resting place: Green Mount Cemetery; Baltimore, Maryland, U.S.
- Party: Democratic
- Spouse(s): Ella Lea Wright (m. 1857; died 1861) Catherine G. Reynolds (m. 1865)
- Relations: William Mayo (great-great grandfather)
- Children: 4, including Pembroke Lea
- Parent: John Watson Triplett Thom (father)
- Education: University of Virginia; Jefferson College
- Occupation: Politician; surgeon
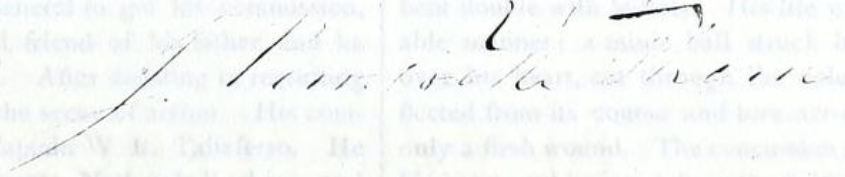
- Signature
- Military career
- Allegiance: United States; Confederate States of America
- Branch: United States Army; United States Navy; Confederate States Army
- Rank: Colonel
- Unit: 11th Infantry Regiment
- Conflicts: Mexican–American War; John Brown's raid on Harpers Ferry; American Civil War; Jackson's Valley Campaign; First Battle of Kernstown

Joseph Pembroke Thom (March 13, 1828 – August 21, 1899) was an American military officer and politician. He served in the United States Navy during the Mexican–American War and served in the American Civil War with the Confederate States Army. He served in the Maryland House of Delegates and as Speaker of the Maryland House of Delegates in 1884.

== Early life ==
Joseph Pembroke Thom was born on March 13, 1828, at his family's "Berry Hill" estate in Culpeper County, Virginia, to Abby de Hart (née Mayo) and Colonel John Watson Triplett Thom. Thom was taught skills at the estate and attended a log schoolhouse. He was the great-great grandson of William Mayo.

Thom was commissioned as lieutenant of the 11th Infantry Regiment at the outbreak of the Mexican–American War. He resigned his commission shortly after speaking with his father about his service. Thom then studied medicine under his brother, Dr. William Alexander Thom. He studied medicine and graduated from the University of Virginia and Jefferson College in Philadelphia, Pennsylvania in 1851.

== Career ==
=== Military career ===
Thom traveled to Washington, D.C. and appealed to President Polk to restore his commission. The President commissioned him second lieutenant under Captain William B. Taliferro. He served in the Mexican–American War, and was wounded at Puente Nacional and Huamantla. He remained in Mexico City after its capture before transferring to duty at Toluca and Veracruz. He developed yellow fever at Veracruz and was sent to Fort Hamilton in New York to recover. He then returned back to Virginia. He served on the USS Savannah for three years. He retired from the United States Navy after serving as a surgeon.

Thom served on the staff of Taliferro during John Brown's raid on Harpers Ferry. He then ranked as colonel. Thom joined the Confederate States Army, serving in Virginia's "Irish Battalion". He participated in General Stonewall Jackson's Jackson's Valley campaign. He was wounded from a minié ball at the First Battle of Kernstown, but was protected by a copy of the Bible in his chest pocket. He was assigned the duty of transferring troops from Richmond. His physician ordered him to Bermuda and Thom ran the blockade from Charleston, South Carolina. Thom then moved to Canada and, in 1863, he was ordered to Italy to await completion of cruisers being built in France for the Confederacy. While abroad, the war ended, and he returned back to the United States in 1866.

=== Political career ===
Thom moved to Baltimore after returning from abroad.

In 1877, Thom was elected to the Baltimore City Council. Thom was elected to the Maryland House of Delegates, representing Baltimore, and served as Speaker of the House in 1884. In 1897, Thom ran for the second district in the Maryland Senate, but lost to Lewis Putzel.

Thom was appointed to the board of management of a state hospital for children in Owings Mills, Maryland, that he failed to pass legislation for while delegate. His son Pembroke Lea Thom followed him as delegate and passed legislation for the establishment of the hospital. He served as collector at the Port of Baltimore during the administrations of President Cleveland. He also served as trustee and was president of the board of Spring Grove Hospital Center for four years. Thom, alongside Dr. William T. Howard and Dr. H. P. C. Wilson, founded The Hospital for Women of Maryland, which would later develop into Greater Baltimore Medical Center.

== Personal life ==
Thom married Ella Lea Wright on October 11, 1857. They had two sons, William H. DeCourcy and Pembroke Lea. His wife died in 1861. Thom married Catherine G. Reynolds of Kentucky in 1865 at Leamington Cathedral in England. They had two sons, Hunt R. Mayo and J. Pembroke Jr.

Thom owned a farm near Catonsville, Maryland, where he raised Jersey cattle. Towards the end of his life, Thom lived at 828 Park Avenue in Baltimore. He was a vestryman of the Christ Protestant Episcopal Church in Baltimore.

Thom died at his home in Baltimore on August 21, 1899 due to complications from an abscess. He was buried at Green Mount Cemetery in Baltimore.
