= Jacob V. W. Herbert =

American politician

Member of the New Jersey General Assembly from the Monmouth County First district
- In office 1856–1857
- Preceded by: George Middleton
- Succeeded by: John VanDoren

Personal details
- Born: April 25, 1812 Herbertsville (now Old Bridge), New Jersey
- Died: June 9, 1899 (aged 87) Bound Brook, New Jersey
- Resting place: Bound Brook Cemetery
- Party: Whig; Republican
- Spouse: Eliza J. Smock

Jacob Van Wickle Herbert (April 25, 1812 – June 9, 1899) was an American politician who represented Monmouth County, New Jersey in the New Jersey General Assembly.

Born in Herbertsville (now Old Bridge), New Jersey, Jacob V. W. Herbert was the son of Brigadier General Obediah Herbert and Margaret Van Wickle, the latter a descendant of the Morgan family and Dutch Evertson family of Sayreville. He lived in Monmouth County, and on May 6, 1836, he married Eliza J. Smock.

In the 1855 general election, Herbert was elected as Assemblyman for the First District, Monmouth County as a Whig, succeeding John VanDoren, a fellow Whig. With the Whig Party collapsing, in 1856 he was reelected as a Republican running under the Opposition Party designation. Jacob Herbert was the first Republican as well as the last Whig to represent Monmouth County in the New Jersey Legislature. In 1857 he was defeated for a third one-year term by Democrat George Middleton.

Jacob Herbert was offered the position of Secretary of State by Governor Charles Smith Olden, but declined.

During the American Civil War, Jacob Herbert served as a Paymaster, with the rank of major. He died in Bound Brook on June 9, 1899.

== First District, Monmouth County ==
Between 1852 and 1893, the New Jersey General Assembly was apportioned into single-member districts within each county. In the 1852 apportionment, the First District in Monmouth County consisted of Manalapan, Millstone and Upper Freehold.
