= William Thom =

William Thom may refer to:

- William Thom, Scottish poet
- William Thom (preacher), co-founder of the Methodist 'New Itinerancy'
- William R. Thom, U.S. Representative from Ohio
- Bill Thom, baseball player

== See also ==
- William Thoms, a British writer credited with coining the term "folklore" in 1846
