= Old Bridge (unincorporated community), New Jersey =

Populated place in Middlesex County, New Jersey, US

Old Bridge, New Jersey
- Unincorporated community
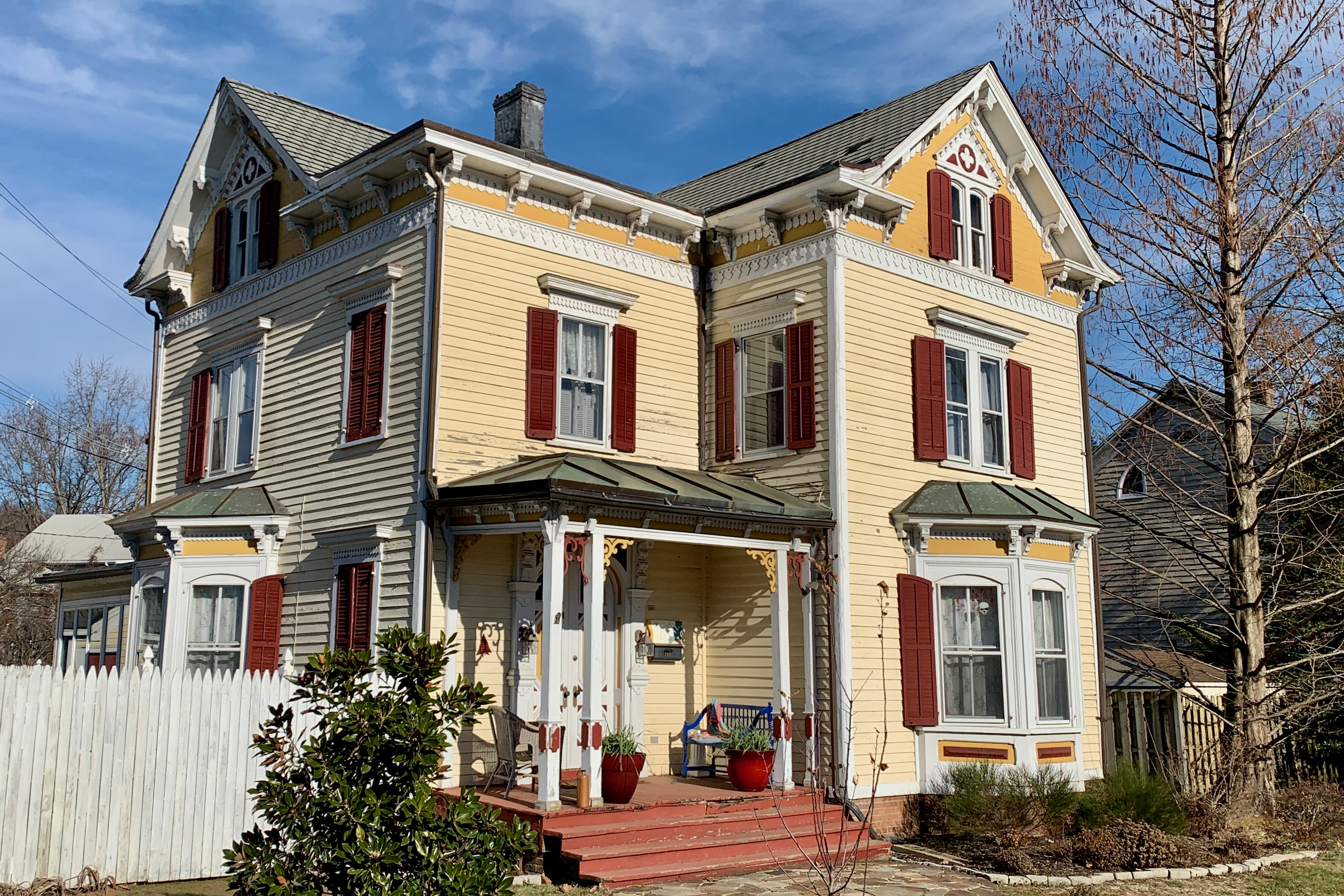
- Victorian house on Main Street

- Location within Middlesex County, New Jersey Location within New Jersey Location within the United States
- Coordinates: 40°24′53″N 74°21′56″W
- Country: United States
- State: New Jersey
- County: Middlesex
- Township: East Brunswick
- Elevation: 13 ft (4.0 m)
- GNIS feature ID: 878951

Old Bridge, also known as the Historic Village of Old Bridge, is an unincorporated community located within East Brunswick in Middlesex County, in the U.S. state of New Jersey. It is on the South River, a tributary of the Raritan River. The community is named after the first bridge built here to cross the river, the South River Bridge. After other bridges were built crossing the river, it became known as the Old Bridge. The Old Bridge Historic District, encompassing much of the village, is listed on the state and national registers of historic places.

== History ==
Located at the head of navigation of the South River, Old Bridge was at the junction of several trade routes. Settlers came to area as early as 1634. The Bordentown and South Amboy Turnpike, a stagecoach route, went through here in 1740. A freight station was built in 1832 on the Camden and Amboy Railroad, which ran through the community. It had a tavern and several houses. On August 9, 1853, there was a major head-on collision between two trains near the station, resulting in several deaths. From c. 1906 to 1921, the Brookfield Glass Company operated a plant here producing bottles and jars.

== Historic district ==
- Old Bridge Historic District
- U.S. National Register of Historic Places
- U.S. Historic district
- New Jersey Register of Historic Places
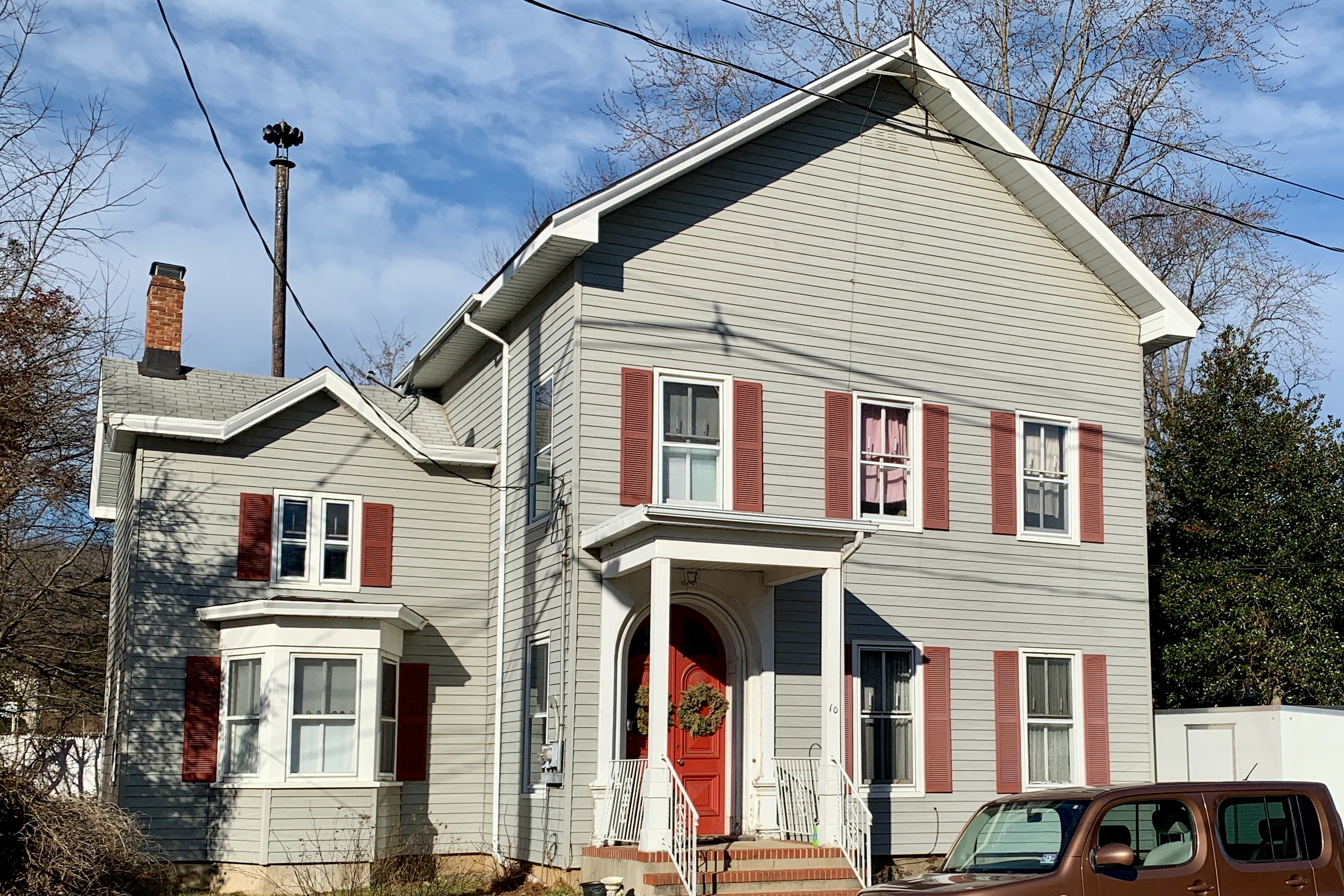
- James Crawford Thom House on Kossman Street
- Location: River Road; Kossman, Pine, Chestnut, Main, Everson, Squire, Maple, and Oak streets; Rutgers Place
- Area: 108 acres (44 ha)
- Architectural style: Greek Revival, Italianate
- NRHP reference No.: 77000882
- NJRHP No.: 1835

Significant dates
- Added to NRHP: June 29, 1977
- Designated NJRHP: September 26, 1975

The Old Bridge Historic District is a 108-acre (44 ha) historic district located along several streets in the community. It was added to the National Register of Historic Places on June 29, 1977, for its significance in art, education, and industry. The district includes 78 contributing buildings.

The artist James Crawford Thom lived at an Italianate style house at 10 Kossman Street from c. 1870 to his death in 1898. The Old Bridge Baptist Church at 21 Kossman Street was built in 1844 and features a gothic arched double door entrance. It was originally known as the Independent Bethel Baptist Church of Washington and Herbertsville. The Simpson Methodist Episcopal Church at 16 Maple Street was built in 1860 and named after Bishop Matthew Simpson. It was purchased in 1977 by the township to be used as the East Brunswick Museum. General Obadiah Herbert (1775–1856), businessman and entrepreneur, lived at 146 Main Street, starting in 1810. For a while, the village was known as Herbertsville in his honor. His son, Jacob V. W. Herbert (1812–1899), was elected to the New Jersey General Assembly representing Monmouth County in 1855. The Alice Appleby Devoe Memorial Library is located at 166 Main Street.

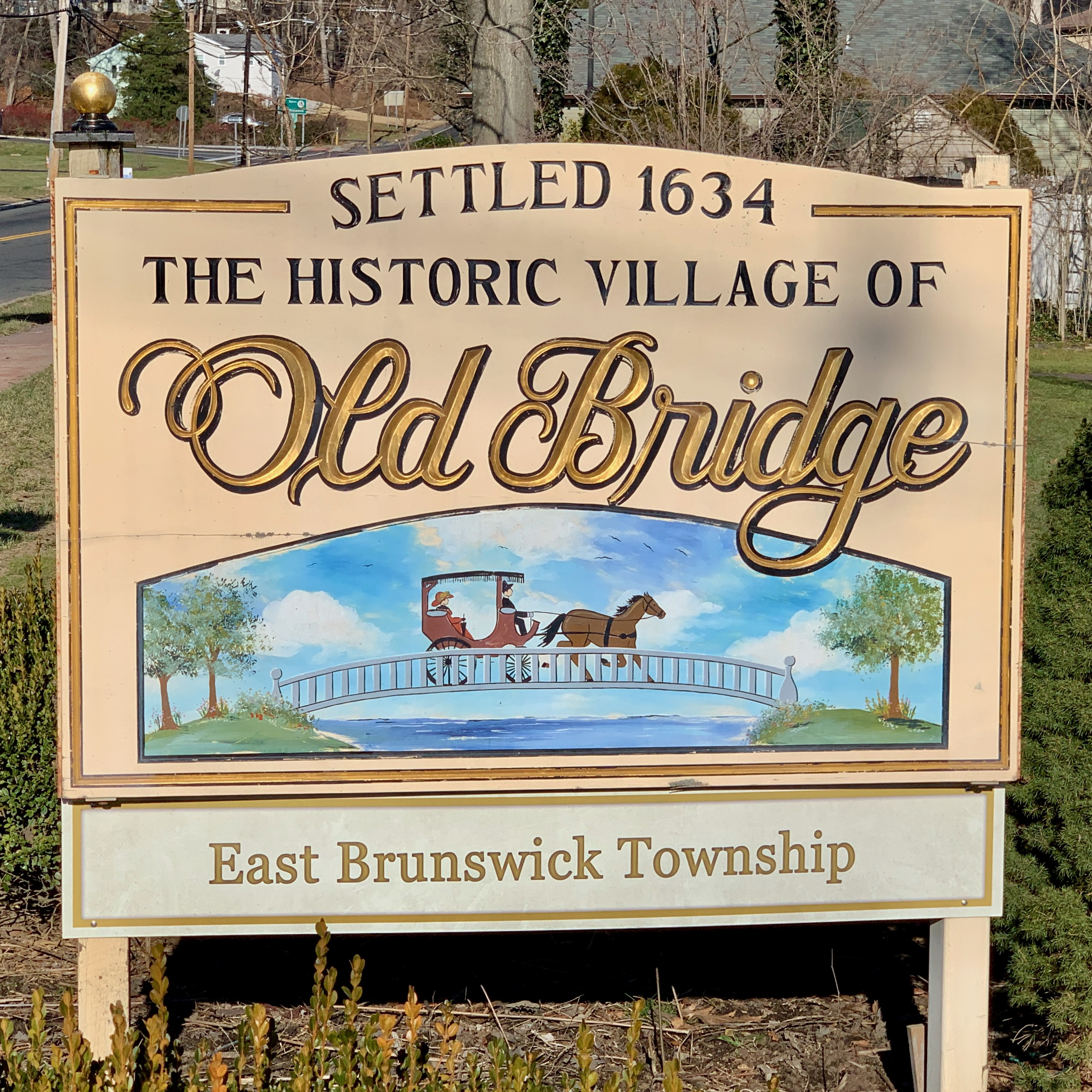
Historic Village of Old Bridge sign

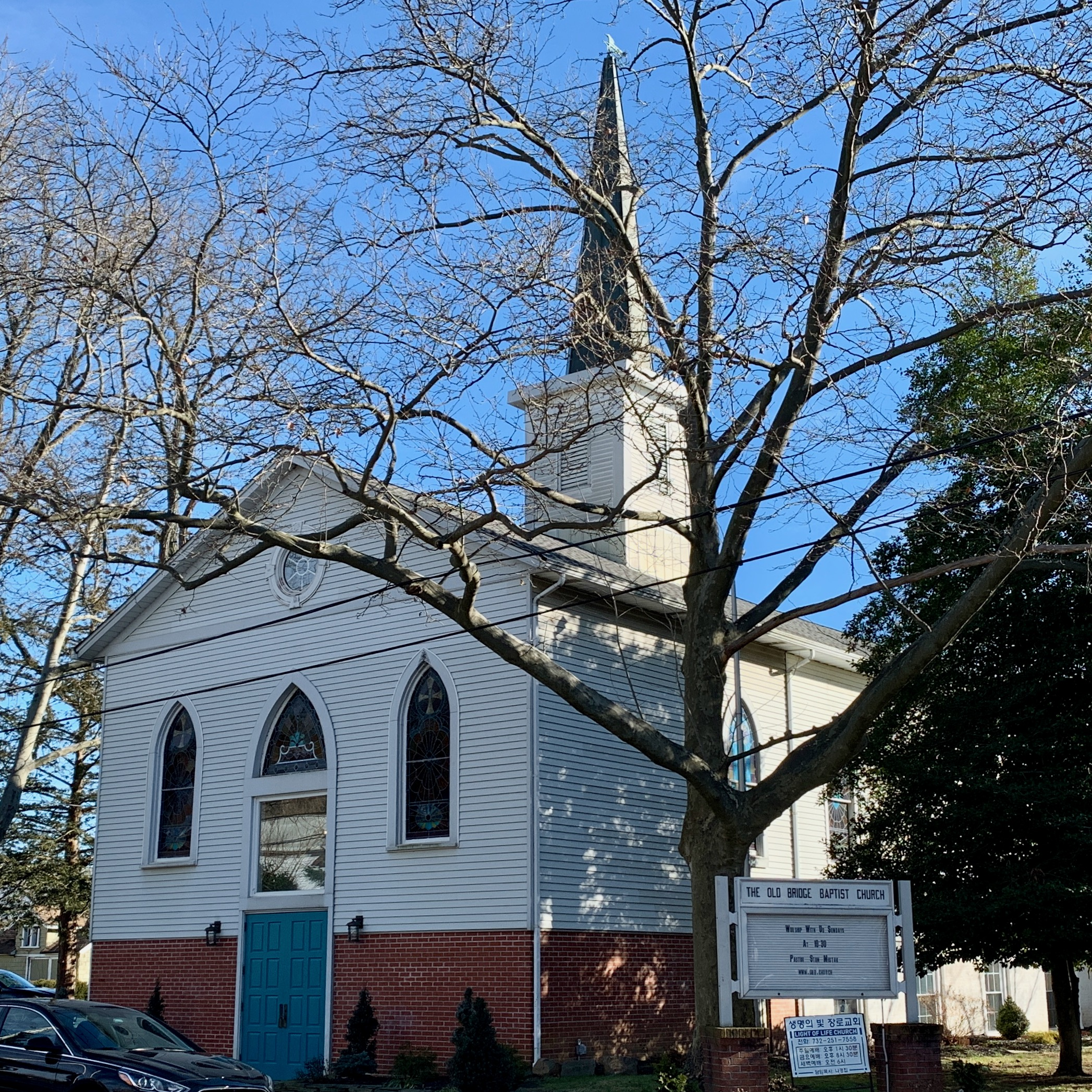
Old Bridge Baptist Church

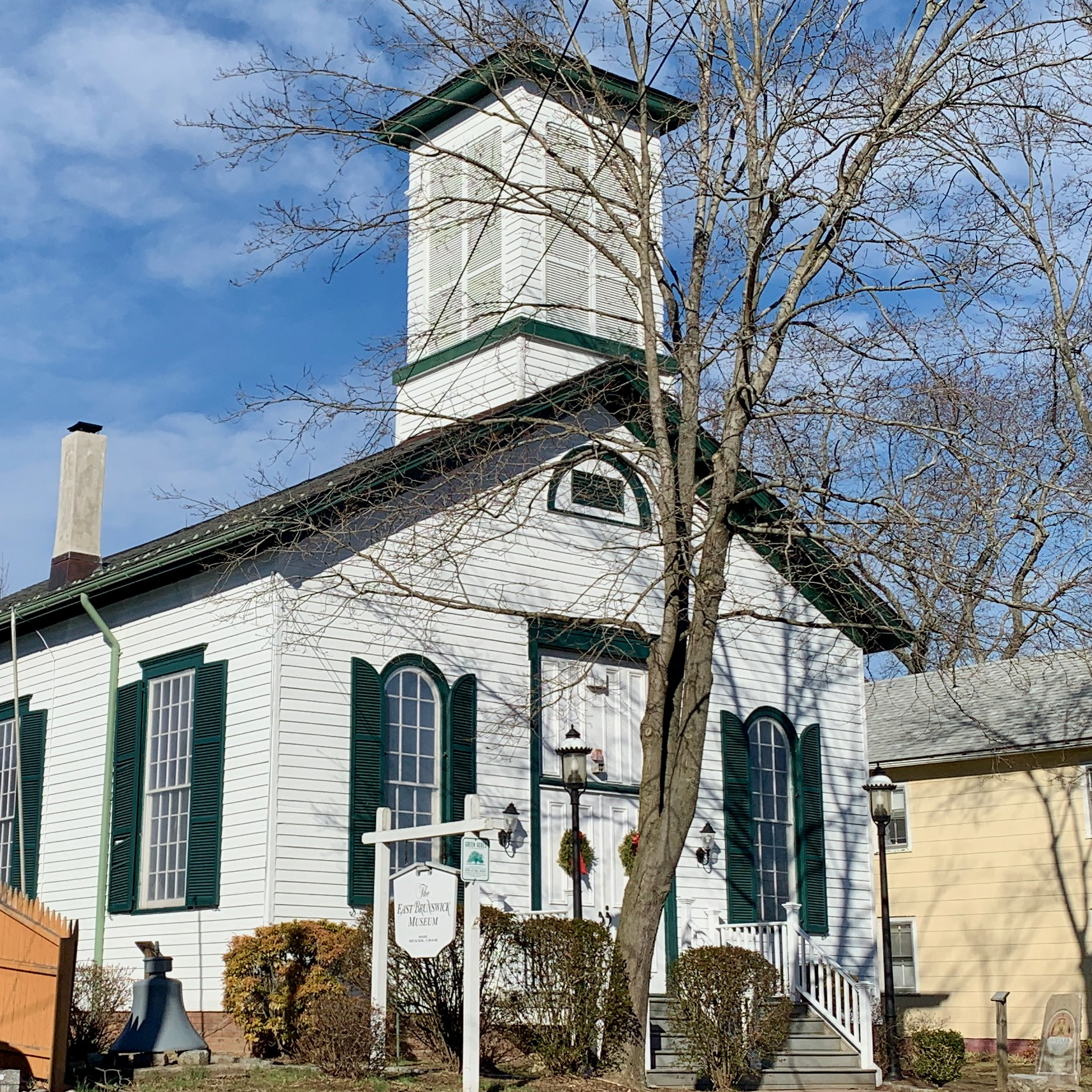
Simpson Methodist Episcopal Church

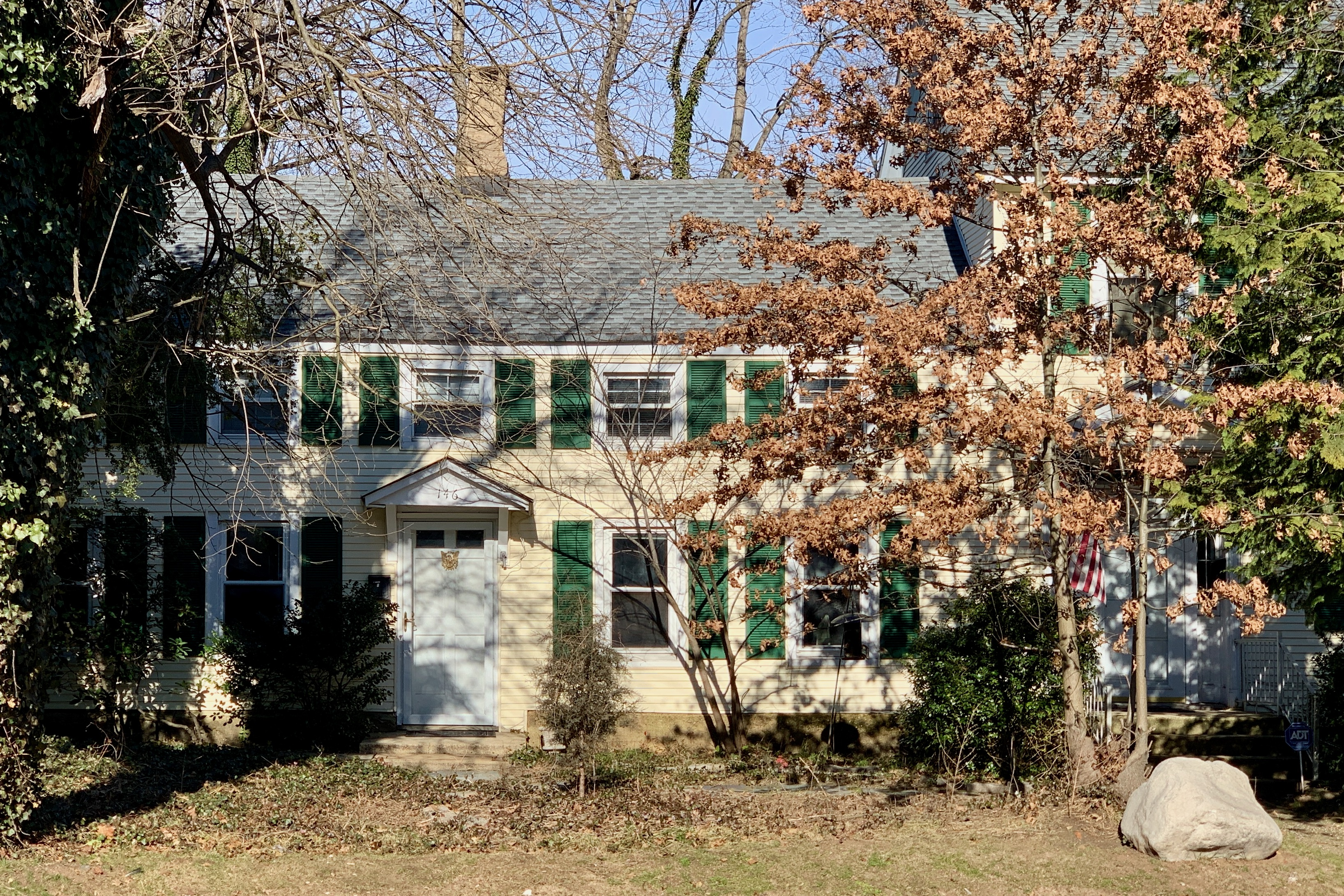
General Obadiah Herbert House

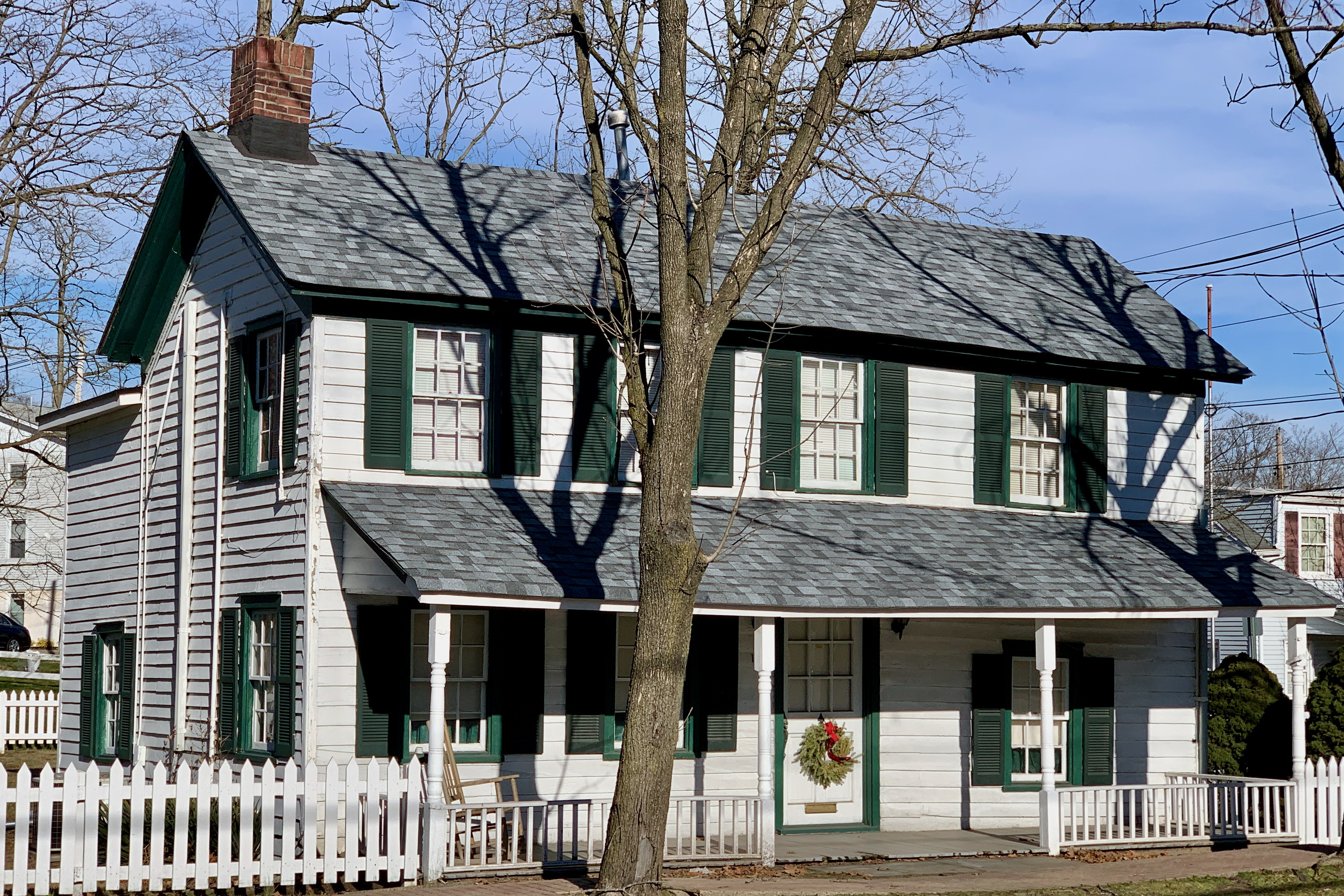
Alice Appleby Devoe Memorial Library

== Transportation ==
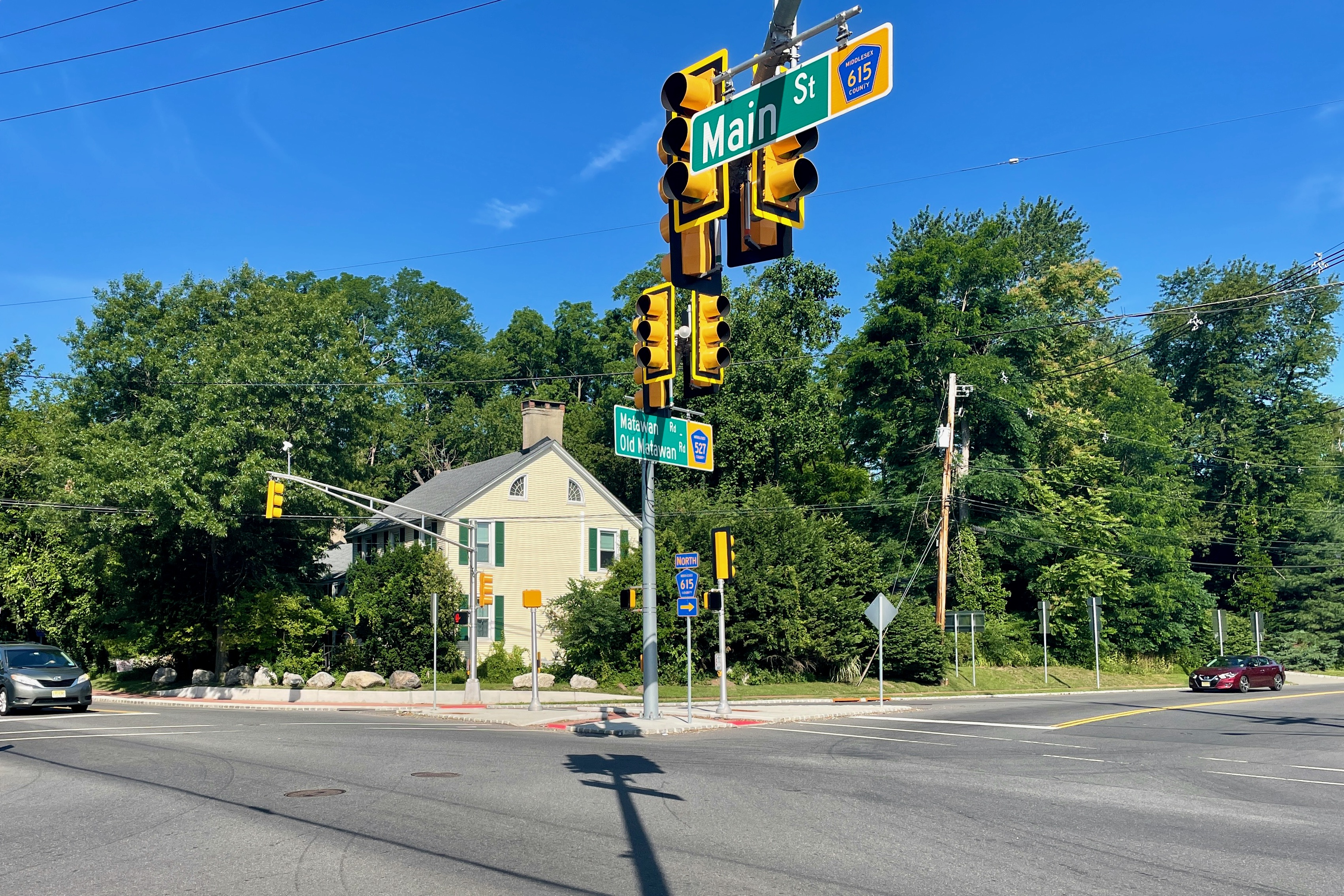
General Obadiah Herbert House at the intersection of CR 527 and CR 615

There are several main roads in the community. CR 527 (Old Bridge Turnpike, Old Bridge–Matawan Road) runs north–south and intersects with CR 615 (Main Street), which also runs north–south. CR 677 (River Road) runs north from CR 615 near the South River. Route 18 can be accessed from CR 615.

== Points of interest ==
Located to the north on Old Bridge Turnpike, the nearby Chestnut Hill Cemetery, also known as the Old Bridge Cemetery, has the remains of many of the families from the community. Including unmarked enslaved peoples graves. Tours of the cemetery formerly were organized by the New Jersey Cultural Alliance. Tours of the Cemetery are now conducted twice annually in Mid October, weather permitting by the East Brunswick Museum Corporation.

South of Main Street and along the South River, Keystone Park offers hiking and natural areas.

== Notable people ==
People who were born in, residents of, or otherwise closely associated with Old Bridge include:

- T. Frank Appleby (1864–1924), politician
- George Brasno (1911–1982), vaudevillian performer
- Olive Brasno (1917–1998), vaudevillian performer, sister of George
- James Crawford Thom (1835–1898), artist, painter
- Henrietta Christian Wright (1854–1899), author of books for children on literature, history and science

== See also ==
- National Register of Historic Places listings in Middlesex County, New Jersey
- List of museums in New Jersey
- List of turnpikes in New Jersey
