= Joseph Barker (minister) =

American journalist

Joseph Barker (11 May 1806 – 15 September 1875) was an English preacher, author, and controversialist. Of changeable views, he spent a period of his life in the United States, where he associated with leading abolitionists.

== Early life ==
Barker was born 11 May 1806, at Bramley, near Leeds, where his father was employed in the woollen manufacture. He was the fourth son of a family of eleven, and was engaged as a wool-spinner. His childhood was one of privation, and his education was chiefly at a Sunday school. His parents were Wesleyans; he was enrolled a member of the community, in which he became an occasional preacher, and then a home missionary and exhorter. After about three years of probation and trial, he was a local preacher. He was then sent to a Methodist school at Leeds, kept by James Sigston.

Leaving the Wesleyan communion, Barker joined the ministry of the Methodist New Connexion. In this body he officiated for a year, 1828–9, as assistant to the superintendent of the Liverpool circuit, which he left with a recommendation to go out as a travelling preacher, on trial. Barker was appointed successively to the Hanley circuit 1829–30, and to the Halifax circuit 1830–1. At Halifax, contrary to the rule for preachers of his standing, he married a Miss Salt, of Betley, in Staffordshire, and was sentenced by the next conference to lose a year of his probation. He went on to Blyth, in the Newcastle-on-Tyne circuit, 1831–2, a disciplinary migration; and to the Sunderland circuit for six months, 1832–3, with residence at Durham. Popular if accused of heretical views, he was in 1833 admitted into 'full connexion,' and appointed, by an innovation, the third married preacher at Sheffield, 1833–5. While at Sheffield and afterwards in the Chester circuit, 1835–7, Barker strongly advocated teetotalism. From 1837 to 1840 he conducted a weekly periodical called The Evangelical Reformer. At the conference of 1839 he was moved from Mossley to Gateshead, a comparatively new circuit, and there denounced socialism.

Barker was expelled from the Methodist New Connexion, at the conference which met at Halifax in 1841, on the grounds that he "had denied the divine appointment of baptism, and refused to administer the ordinance". After his expulsion, which was followed by a loss to the Connexion estimated at "29 societies and 4,348 members", Barker became the pastor of a church in Newcastle-on-Tyne, which had, like himself, left the Methodist New Connexion. Here it was Barker's custom to deliver daily lectures, followed by free discussions. He became a printer, and in addition to other publications began to issue a periodical called The Christian; his adherents were known as Barkerites. At this period he held a ten nights' discussion with the Methodist Rev. William Cooke.

== 1845–1860 ==
Barker, whose views were constantly changing, for a time inclined to Quakerism, and afterwards to Unitarianism. In 1845 he preached in Unitarian chapels, in London and elsewhere. The Unitarians enabled him to start a printing establishment on a larger scale at Wortley, a suburb of Leeds, where, on 6 July 1846, a steam printing-press, which had been provided at a cost of some £600l., was publicly presented to him by Dr. John Bowring. Some months previously Barker had issued a Proposal for a new library of three hundred volumes, the cheapest collection of works ever published. He now issued week by week a series of cheap books, theological, philosophical, ethical, and otherwise, under the title of the "Barker Library". Here also he published anonymously an autobiographical work, The History and Confessions of a Man, as put forth by himself, Wortley, 1846; which was substantially reproduced in Barker's Review, 1861–3, as The Life of a Man, and in the posthumously published Life of Joseph Barker, written by himself, London, 1880.

In 1846 Barker went into politics, advocating republicanism for England, repeal for Ireland, which he had visited in June and July 1845, and the nationalisation of the land. He started a weekly periodical called The People to propagate his opinions, which reached a circulation of over 20,000. In 1847, in the course of which year he made a six months' tour in America, he foretold, in his Companion to the Almanac, the French revolution of 1848. Barker threw himself into the Chartist agitation which followed, as the advocate of "peaceful legal measures". After the summer assizes in 1848, the judge at Liverpool issued bench warrants for the arrest of a number of political agitators, including Barker. He was arrested about six weeks later, and taken to the city gaol at Manchester. He was detained until four o'clock on the next day, when the magistrates took bail; and Barker went to Bolton, where he had been the same day elected M.P. for the borough by a large majority, though he never sat in parliament.

Whilst still waiting for trial at the Liverpool winter assizes, Barker was elected a member of the town council of Leeds. At the assizes the attorney-general at the last moment entered a nolle prosequi, and Barker was set free. His views were now something like deism. In 1851 he moved with his family to Central Ohio. In the United States he joined the anti-slavery party, and associated with William Lloyd Garrison, Wendell Phillips Garrison, Henry C. Wright, and other leading abolitionists. From Wright he accepted the principle of nonresistance. While living in Ohio he gave lectures arguing against the divine origin of the Bible and became interested in spiritualism after attending a local seance.

Barker settled in Nebraska, where he purchased a large tract of land at a low price. In the summer of 1857, he began a long lecture tour. In Philadelphia he fulfilled an engagement of eight months, during which he lectured every Sunday. After spending a few weeks with his family in Nebraska, he returned to Philadelphia in August 1858, to undertake another eight months' course of lectures. Barker sailed from Boston 11 January 1860, for England, and having landed at Liverpool proceeded to Betley, in Staffordshire, the native place of his wife. His wife and children followed in August of the same year, and found him already engaged in secularist propaganda as one of the editors of the National Reformer, a position which, however, he then vacated in disgust.

== Later life ==
On a re-examination of the Bible, Barker then began to retrace his steps towards orthodoxy, and to doubt "the beneficent tendency of infidelity". The process of return is documented in Barker's Review of Politics, Literature, Religion, and Morals, and Journal of Education, Science, and Co-operation, a publication he started on Saturday, 7 September 1861, after he had abandoned what he called the "unbounded license party". In 1862 he became lecturer to a congregation of an eclectic kind of 'unbelievers' at Burnley, where he lived and laboured for more than a year, enforcing precepts of morality, and often taking occasion to speak favourably of the Bible and Christianity. He was formally reconciled to his old religious belief, and afterwards preached, at their invitation, to the Methodist reformers of Wolverhampton. After accepting invitations from the Primitive Methodists of Bilston and Tunstall, he joined their community as a local preacher, and held the office until 1868.

Barker was in bad health, and the death of his wife at Nottingham about this time, affected him greatly. He returned to America and stayed for a short time at Omaha, where his estate had become a valuable property; then went east, and made Philadelphia his headquarters. He printed books and tracts in defence of the Christian religion. After spending the winter of 1874–5 at Boston, he slowly travelled back to Omaha in the following spring, resting with friends at New York and Philadelphia on his way. He died at Omaha on 15 September 1875, and was buried there. A few days before his death he declared that he "died in the full and firm belief of Jesus Christ, and in the faith and love of His religion as revealed in His life and works, as described in the New Testament."

== Works ==
Other writings by Barker were his Christianity Triumphant, Wortley, 1846; The Life of William Penn, the celebrated Quaker and Founder of Pennsylvania, London and Wortley, 1847, the second volume of the Barker Library; Lectures on the Church of England Prayer-book, Wortley, 1847; Confessions of Joseph Barker, a Convert from Christianity, London, 1858, a letter addressed to George Jacob Holyoake, from Omaha city, Nebraska, 22 July 1858, and reprinted from The Reasoner; and the Life of Joseph Barker, written by himself, 1880, the autobiographical portion of which was brought down to the year 1868, with later details, and commentaries, supplied by Joseph Barker, junior, and J. T. Barker, the editor of the volume.
