= William Thom (preacher) =

William Thom (also known as 'Billy') (1751-1811) was a Methodist preacher and co-founder, with Alexander Kilham, of the breakaway 'New Itinerancy', later the Methodist New Connection, founded in 1797. Thom was the first President of the New Connection, while Kilham was its first secretary. Thom wrote a brief guide entitled Serious advice to the servants of the Methodist Society: in the circuit of Leeds, published in 1796, and he and Kilham jointly wrote the Out-lines of a constitution; proposed for the examination, amendment and acceptance, of the members of the Methodist New Itinerancy, which was published in 1797.

He was mentioned in John Wesley's Last Will and Testament as being 'of Whitby' and listed as a 'preacher and expounder of God's Holy Word'. Wesley wrote a letter to Thom in 1790 regarding the Methodist position on attending Church of England communion services.

== Memorial ==
Bethesda Chapel in Albion Street, Hanley (now a redundant church) has four monuments erected in memory of those who helped to establish the Methodist New Connexion in Hanley, including one dedicated to the memory of William Thom, describing him as "an able minister of the gospel".
