= Methodist New Connexion =

Church

The Methodist New Connexion, also known as Kilhamite Methodism, was a Protestant nonconformist church. It was formed in 1797 by secession from the Wesleyan Methodists, and merged in 1907 with the Bible Christian Church and the United Methodist Free Churches to form the United Methodist Church. In Australia, it joined with those, along with the Wesleyan Methodist Church and Primitive Methodist Church, to form the Methodist Church of Australasia in 1902.

== History ==
The secession was led by Alexander Kilham and William Thom, and resulted from a dispute regarding the position and rights of the laity. In 1791, Kilham denounced the Methodist Conference for giving too much power to the itinerant ministers of the church, at the expense of the laity. The Plan of Pacification adopted by the conference in 1795 further entrenched his position, and Kilham was expelled from the conference in 1797.

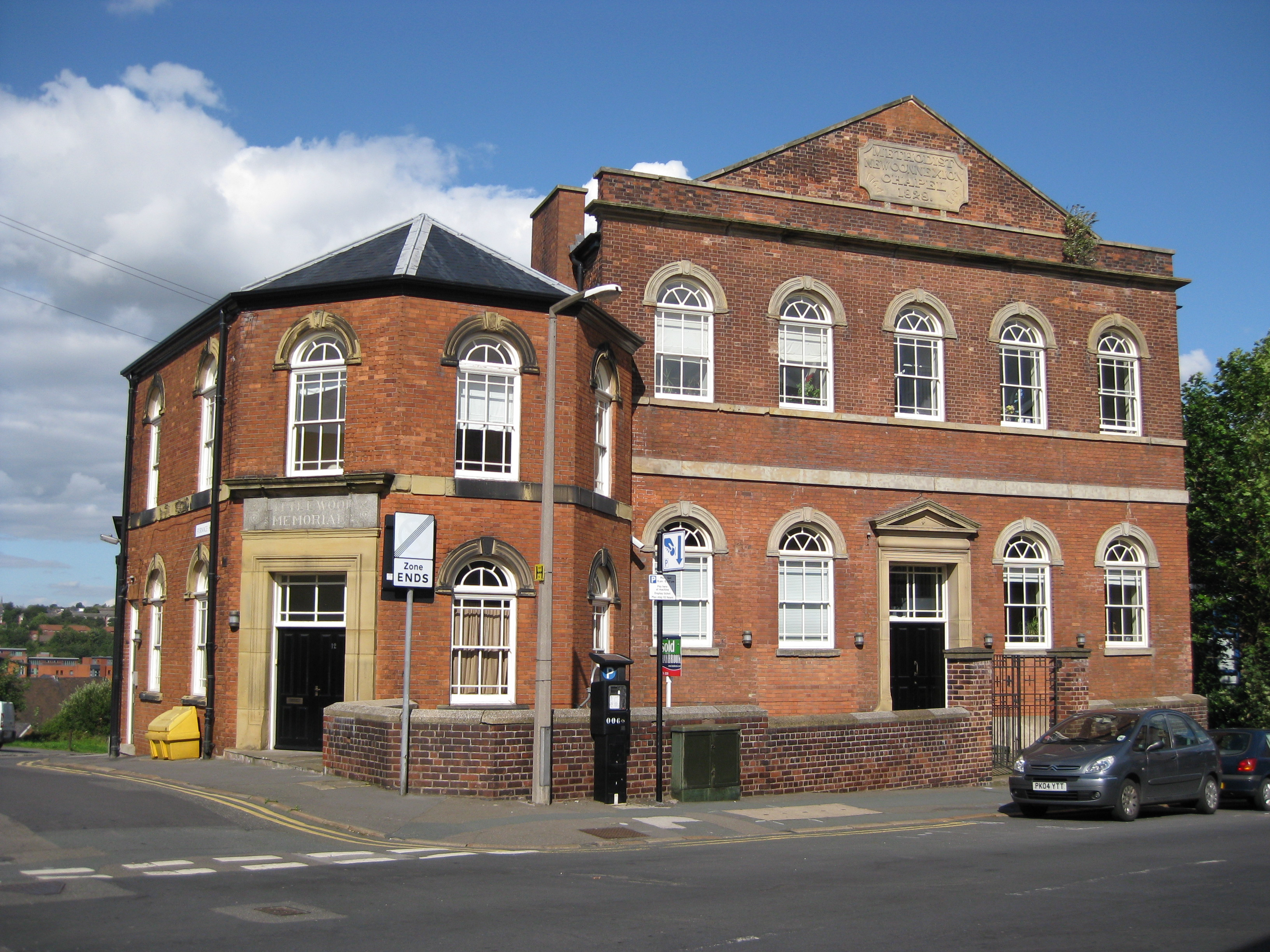
Methodist New Connexion Chapel, Sheffield (1828)

Providence Chapel (1829), a former New Connexion chapel, now restored to an early 20th century appearance and located at the Black Country Living Museum, Dudley

Kilham formed the New Connexion, based around his church in Sheffield. It thrived, and soon spread across Britain. At its conferences, ministers and laymen were of equal number, the laymen being chosen by the circuits and in some cases by guardian representatives elected for life by conference. Otherwise the doctrines and order of the Connexion were the same as those of the Wesleyans, although some Wesleyans accused Kilham of revolutionary sympathies and links with Tom Paine.

Joseph Barker led an extensive secession from the Connexion after 1841 which resulted from the charismatic Barker's refusal to carry out infant baptism, and the harsh handling of his expulsion by the Connexion leadership. It is reported that 21% of the Connexion's members left during the 1840s.

At the time of the union in 1907, the Methodist New Connexion had some 250 ministers and 45,000 members.

=== The Methodist New Connexion's missionary work in China ===
The Methodist New Connexion entered China in 1860, immediately after the close of the Second Opium War, and after the signing of the Treaty of Tianjin, which opened China to the Christian missionary. The pioneers of the movement were Revs. John Innocent and W. N. Hall, who established themselves in Tianjin, which was then a pioneer mission field. Hall died of fever in 1878. There were three preaching rooms in the city of Tianjin, one being in the main thoroughfare, and in these daily preaching was kept up. On the English concession there was a large mission establishment, consisting of a training college for native students for the ministry, missionaries houses, and a boarding school for the training of native women and girls in Christian life and work. Rev. J. Robinson-Brown was the principal of the college, and Miss Waller was in charge of the girls school.

The largest mission of this Society was in the north-east portion of the province of Shandong, where about fifty native churches were maintained in an agricultural district extending over about three hundred miles. The headquarters of this circuit were in Chu Chia, Laoling district, where were situated the mission houses, and a medical dispensary and hospital. Innocent was the head of this circuit and the hospital was in charge of Drs. W. W. Shrubshall and F. W. Marshall. In this place also is located Rev. J. K. Robson, who had devoted himself to the work of the Mission at his own charges.

Another mission was opened at the Tangshan Collieries, near Kaiping, in the north of the province of Zhili. This was under the charge of Rev. F. B. Turner, and rapidly extended, having a church in the ancient city of Yung-ping-fu, near the old wall, and also several rural chapels in the district round Kaiping.

The work of this Society was chiefly carried on by native agency; a large number of efficient men had been trained and qualified by means of the training college. Several native women were also set apart as Biblewomen to their own sex; one of these, Mrs Hu, had laboured in this capacity for nearly twenty-five years, and was the first such agent ever employed in China. This Mission in 1890 numbered seven missionaries, two medical agents, one lady agent, forty-six native helpers, and six female native helpers. It had over thirteen hundred communicants, and about two hundred and fifty scholars in its day and boarding schools.

=== Other notable members of the Methodist New Connexion ===
- William Booth – who would found The Salvation Army – was ordained as a Methodist New Connexion Minister in 1858.
- James Maughan - a prominent minister in South Australia.
- Everton F.C. was founded in 1878 out of a football group from St. Domingo's Methodist New Connexion Chapel in Everton, Liverpool.

== See also ==
- Protestant missionary societies in China during the 19th Century
