= Alexander Kilham =

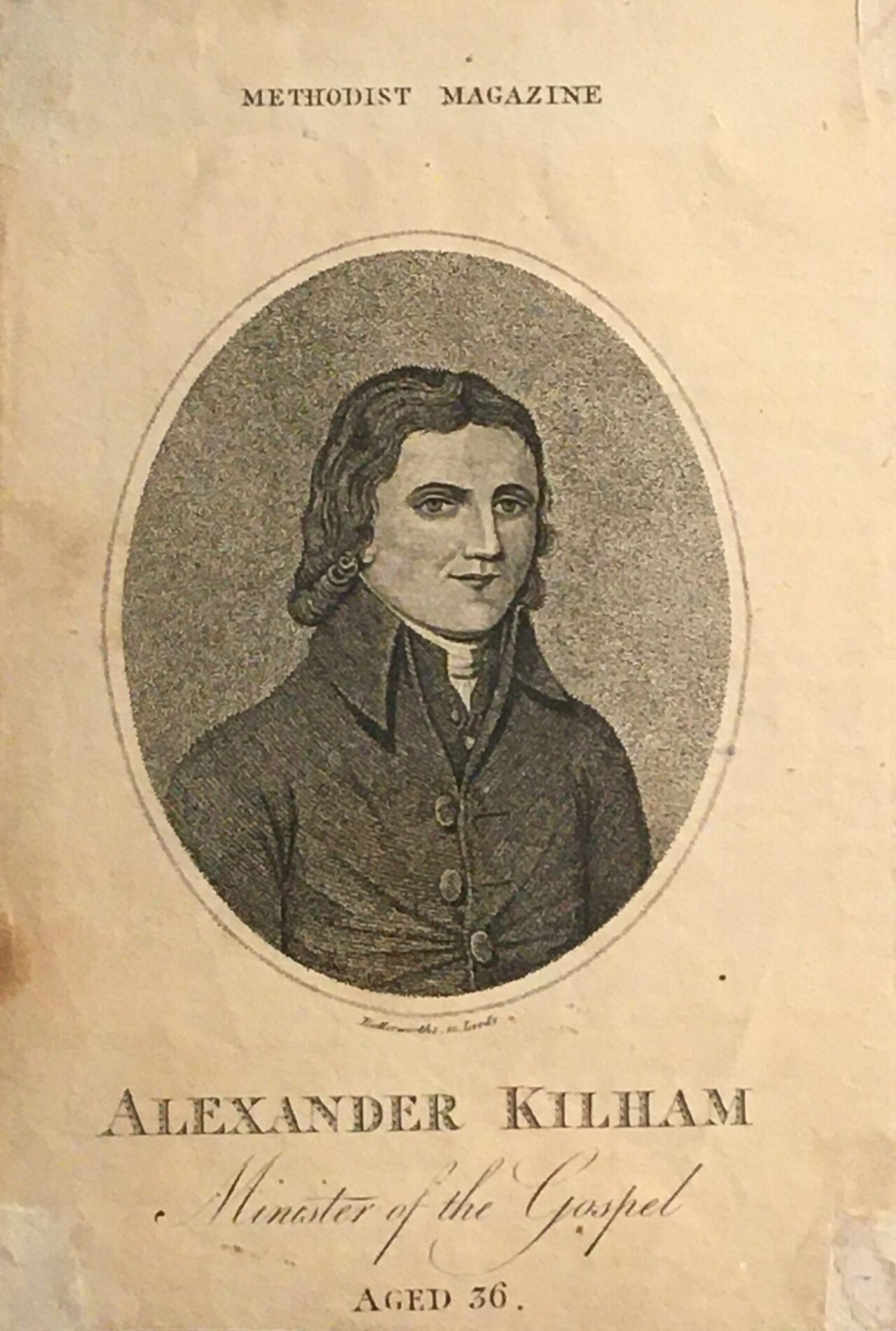
Alexander Kilham (c. 1798)

Alexander Kilham (20 July 1762 – 20 December 1798) was an English Methodist minister.

== Early life ==
He was born to parents Simon and Elizabeth Kilham at Epworth, Lincolnshire, possibly at a former farm, now known as Prospect House, otherwise 79 High Street.

== Ministry ==
He was admitted by John Wesley in 1785 into the regular itinerant Methodist ministry. He became minister of a circuit in Sheffield; and also the leader and spokesman of the democratic party in the Connexion which claimed for the laity the free election of class-leaders and stewards, and equal representation with ministers at Conference. They also contended that the ministry should possess no official authority or pastoral prerogative, but should merely carry into effect the decisions of majorities in the different meetings.

Kilham further advocated the complete separation of the Methodists from the Anglican Church. In the controversy that ensued he wrote many pamphlets, often anonymous, and frequently provocative. For this he was arraigned before the Conference of 1796 and expelled, and he and William Thom then founded a movement initially called ‘The New Itinerancy’, then the Methodist New Connexion (1798, merged since 1907 in the United Methodist Church), and now part of the Methodist Church of Great Britain following the Methodist Union of 1932. British Methodist church governance now largely reflects Kilham's ideas.

Kilham and Thom jointly wrote the Out-lines of a constitution; proposed for the examination, amendment and acceptance, of the members of the Methodist New Itinerancy, which was published in 1797.

He died in 1798, and the success of the church he founded is a tribute to his personality and to the principles for which he strove. Kilham's second wife, Hannah Kilham née Spurr (1774–1832), whom he married only a few months before his death, became a Quaker, and worked as a missionary in the Gambia and Sierra Leone; she transcribed to writing several West African languages.
