= J. C. Thom =

American painter

James Crawford Thom (March 22, 1835 – February 16, 1898) was an American painter. Born in New York City, he studied at an artist colony in Perth Amboy, New Jersey along with Louis Comfort Tiffany of stained glass fame. He also studied with Edouard Frere, among others. He painted "By the River-Side" "Returning from the Wood", "Tired of Waiting", "Going to School", and "The Monk's Walk". Thom died in 1898 and is buried at the Chestnut Hill Cemetery in the Old Bridge section of East Brunswick, New Jersey.

== Career ==
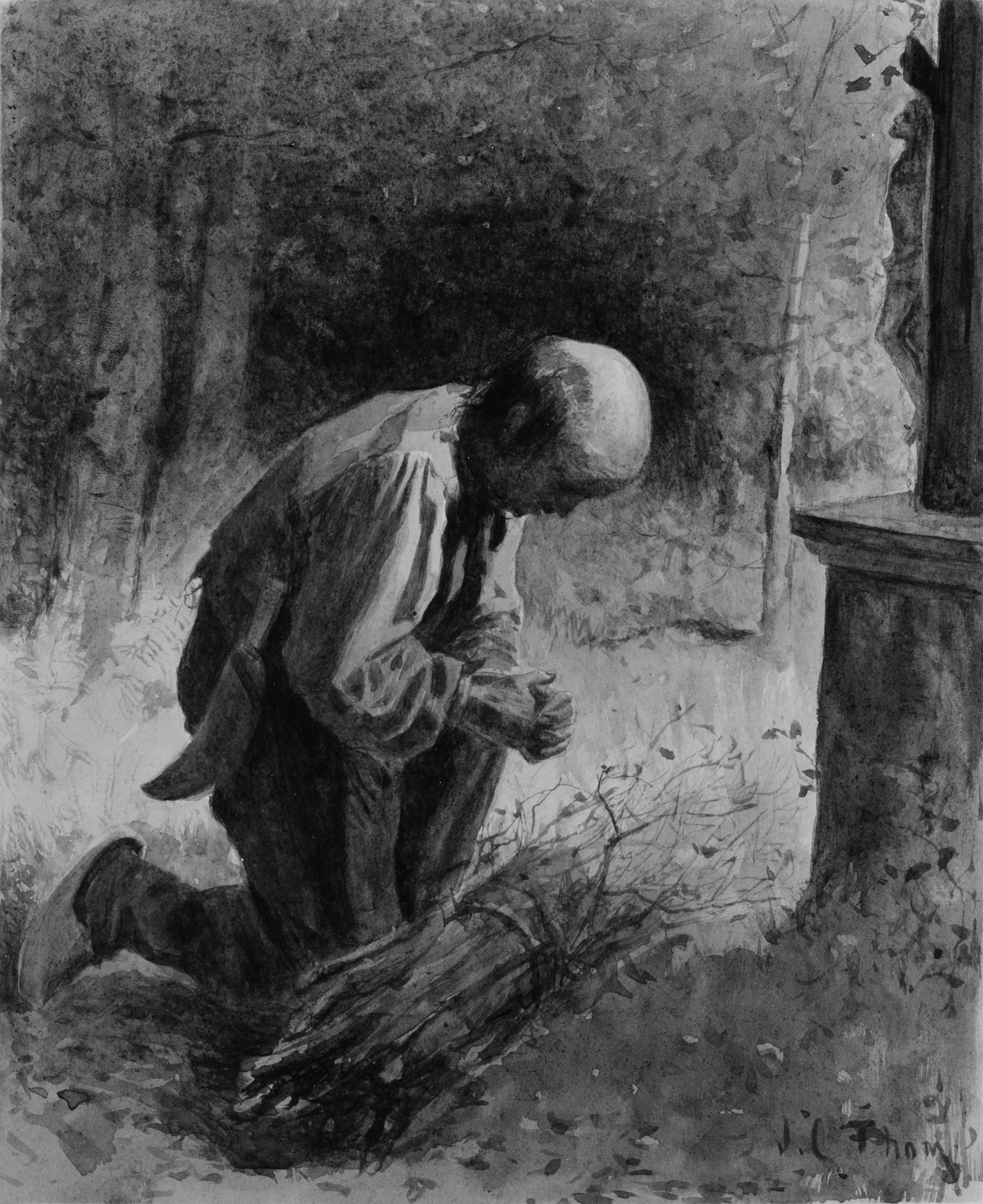
Woodcutter Kneeling before a Forest Shrine in the Walters Museum

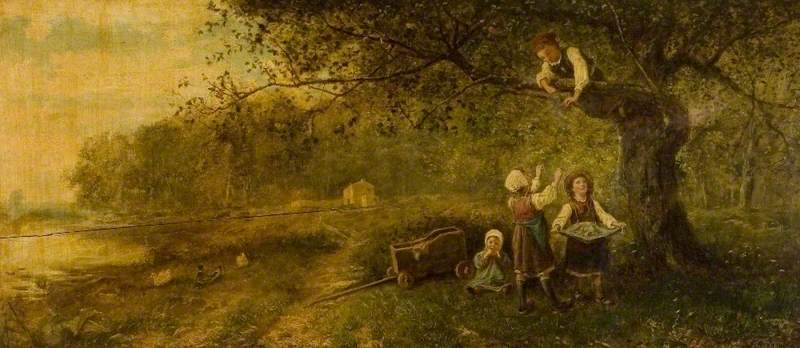
Picking Apples in the Herbert Art Gallery and Museum

Thom studied at the National Academy in 1853. In 1859, he went to France with Corot and Frere in Ecouen. He was the first American painter joining the School of Ecouen created by Pierre edouard Frere. In the local census of 1861, he is registered as living in Ecouen, 13 "rue de Paris" under the name of Croquefort Tom. From 1864 to 1873, he worked in England, often exhibiting at the Royal Academy. His landscapes showed the influence of the second-generation Hudson River school painters. His genre paintings such as "Feeding the Ducks" and "Circus Scene".

== Personal life ==
Thom was born March 22, 1835, in New York City, New York, the son of sculptor James Thom (April 19, 1802 - April 17, 1850 ) and Jessie Thom (d. December 5, 1868). James married Louise Giles and had a son Salvatore Thom (b. 1865) born in France and Ada (b. 1866), James (b. 1867), Blanche and Jessie all born in England. Louise Giles Thom died in 1881. Thom then married Sarah Bloodgood, in 1884, the daughter of a carriage maker. They lived at 10 Willow St (now Kossman St) Old Bridge (now East Brunswick). According to the 1861 Map of Middlesex, NJ, this house belonged to J.H. Bloodgood, Sarah's father. He had a carriage building shop next store to his house.

And through Salvatore (1867–1946), his son Salvatore Jr. (1894–1976) and his son Francis Crawford Thom (1931–2012) the Thoms have remained sculptors and painters.

Ada married Frank Hoffman of New Jersey and had four sons; the future Governor of New Jersey Harold G. Hoffman, Donald Hoffman, Fletcher Hoffman and Peter Hoffman. Harold G. Hoffman became known as the "most crooked governor New Jersey ever had." James Crawford Thom is buried in the Thom family plot in the Old Bridge Cemetery, Old Bridge, NJ.

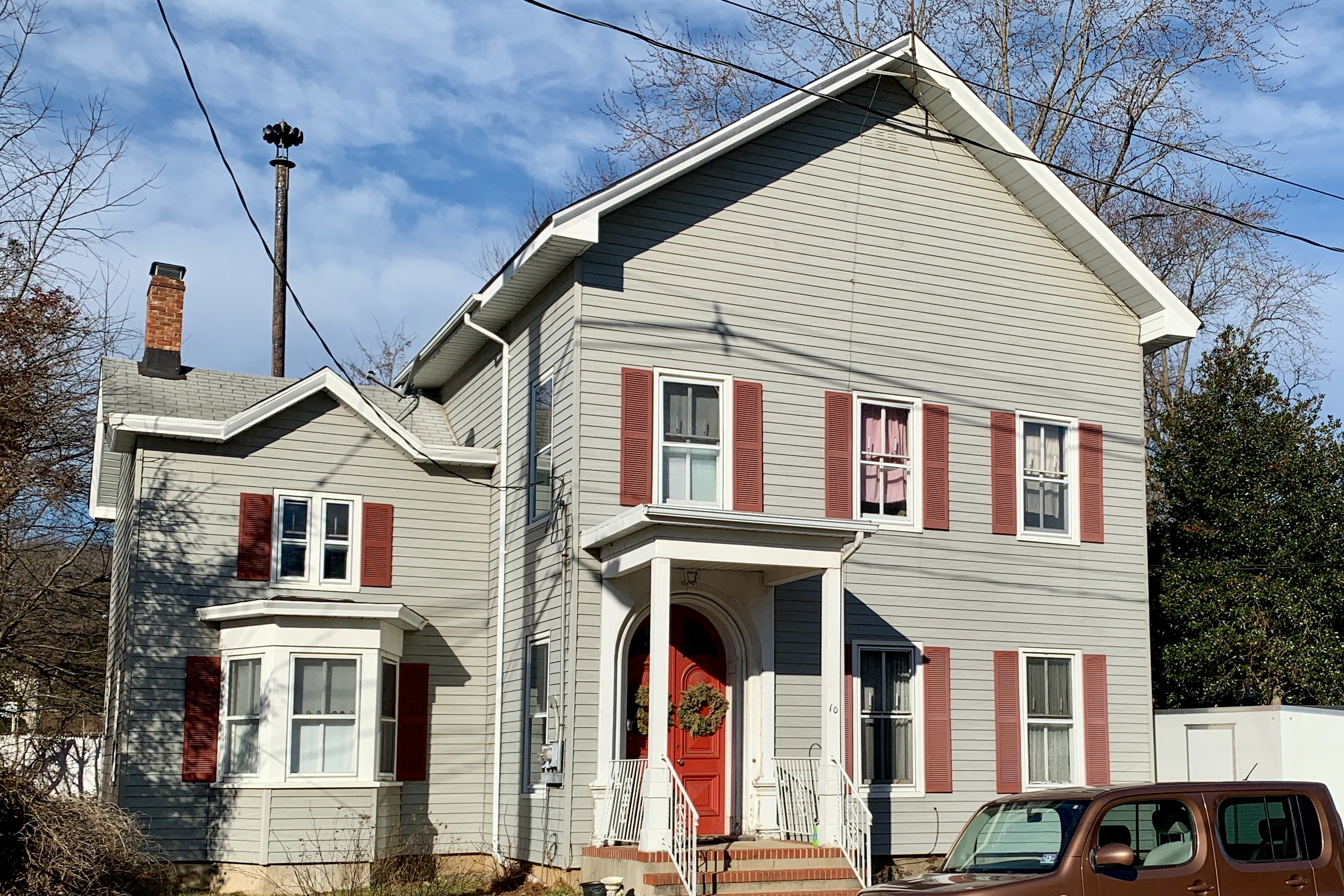
Thom's house in East Brunswick

From 1884 to his death, Thom lived in Old Bridge. He died of pneumonia in Atlantic Highlands.

== Works ==
Works: Returning from the Wood (1864); Love in the Kitchen; Return of the Conscript; Going to Church, Christmas Eve (1876); Le jour de la Toussaint (1878); Watering his Horse, Morning Ride (1880); Rustic Sport, Summer Afternoon (1882); Old Farm House, South River, River Bank (1884); The Pets (1885)
