= Graeme Thom =

Zimbabwean cricketer (born 1967)

Personal information
- Full name: Graeme Ian Thom
- Born: 13 May 1967 (age 59); Salisbury, Rhodesia
- Batting: Right-handed
- Bowling: Right-arm medium

Domestic team information
- Years: Team
- 1994/95: Mashonaland Country Districts

Career statistics
Competition	FC
Matches	1
Runs scored	16
Batting average	–
100s/50s	0/0
Top score	14*
Balls bowled	96
Wickets	3
Bowling average	30.00
5 wickets in innings	0
10 wickets in match	0
Best bowling	2/59
Catches/stumpings	0/–
- Source: ESPNcricinfo, 19 July 2021

Graeme Ian Thom (born 13 May 1967) is a former Zimbabwean cricketer. A right-handed batsman and right-arm medium pace bowler, he played one first-class match for Mashonaland Country Districts during the 1994–95 Logan Cup.
