= John Watson Triplett Thom =

American politician and planter (1769–1855)

Member of the Virginia Senate
- In office 1815

Personal details
- Born: November 11, 1769 Westmoreland County, Virginia, British America
- Died: May 22, 1855 (aged 85) Culpeper County, Virginia, U.S.
- Spouse(s): Lucy Lewis (died) Abigail de Hart Mayo (m. 1815)
- Children: 4, including Joseph Pembroke
- Occupation: Planter; politician

John Watson Triplett Thom (November 11, 1769 – May 22, 1855) was an American slave owner, planter and politician. He served in the Virginia Senate in 1815 and two terms in the Virginia House of Delegates.

== Early life ==
John Watson Triplett Thom was born on November 11, 1769, in Westmoreland County, Virginia, to Elizabeth (née Triplett) and Alexander Thom of Gloucester County, Virginia.

== Career ==
Thom commanded a regiment of troops raised from Culpeper County for three years during the War of 1812. He was a large planter and inherited the "Berry Hill" estate in Culpeper County from his father. He owned about two hundred slaves.

Thom served as a member of the Virginia House of Delegates for at least two terms. He served in the Virginia Senate in 1815. He served as high sheriff of Culpeper County for three terms.

== Personal life ==
Thom married Lucy Lewis (born 1783), daughter of Dr. John Taliaferro Lewis. They had three children, Lucy Lewis, John Catesby (1809–1881) and Warner Lewis. His wife died. Thom married Abigail de Hart Mayo, great-granddaughter of William Mayo, on July 27, 1815. They had one son, Joseph Pembroke Thom (1828–1899).

Thom was a vestryman of St. Stephen's Parish, a Protestant church, in Culpeper County.

Thom died on May 22, 1855, at "Berry Hill" in Culpeper County.
