= Alexander Thom (disambiguation) =

Alexander Thom (1894–1985) was a Scottish engineer.

Alexander Thom may also refer to:

- Alexander Thom (surgeon) (1775–1845), Scottish military surgeon, judge and political figure in Upper Canada
- Alexander Thom (almanac editor) (1801–1879), Scottish publisher in Ireland
- Alexander Thom (footballer) (1894–1973), Scottish footballer

== See also ==
- James Alexander Thom (born 1933), American author
