= Robert Thom =

Robert Thom may refer to:

- Robert Thom (engineer) (1774–1847), Scottish civil engineer
- Robert Thom (priest), Scottish clergyman, Dean of Brechin
- Robert Thom (illustrator) (1915–1979), American illustrator known for his portrayal of historical scenes
- Robert Thom (translator) (1807–1846), English–Chinese translator based in Canton, China
- Robert Absalom Thom (1873–1955), Scottish engineer
- Robert Thom (writer) (1929–1979), American author
