= James Thom (sculptor) =

Scottish sculptor

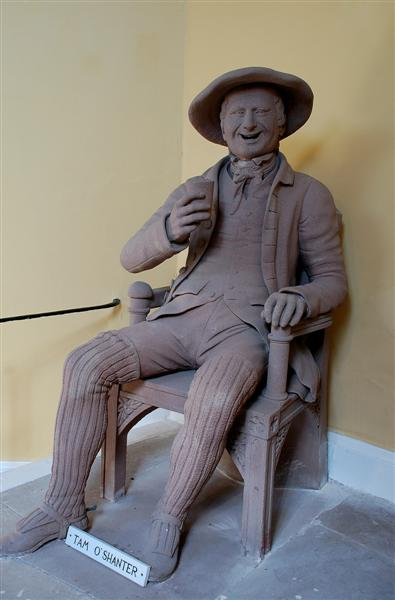
Tam O'Shanter (1828), by James Thom

James Thom (17 April 1802 – 17 April 1850) was a Scottish sculptor; his sculptures of characters from Scottish literature were immediately successful.

== Early life ==
Thom was born in 1802, son of James Thom, a farm worker, and his wife Margaret Morison; his birthplace was about a mile from Lochlea, where Robert Burns lived for some time. While Thom was young his family moved to Meadowbank in the adjoining parish of Stair. With his younger brother Robert (1805–1895) he was apprenticed to Howie & Brown, builders of Kilmarnock, and, although he took little interest in the more ordinary part of his craft, he was fond of ornamental carving, in which he excelled.

== Sculptures ==
While engaged upon a monument in Crosbie churchyard, near Monkton, in 1827, he attracted the attention of David Auld, a hairdresser in Ayr. Encouraged by Auld, he carved a bust of Burns from a portrait — a copy of the portrait by Alexander Nasmyth — which hung in the Burns Monument at Alloway. It confirmed Auld's opinion of Thom's ability, and induced him to advise the sculptor to attempt something more ambitious. It was decided to create statues of Tam O'Shanter and Souter Johnnie, characters from Burns's poem Tam o' Shanter; Thom, who resided with Auld, set to work on the life-size figures, which were hewn direct from the stone without a preliminary sketch. William Brown, tenant of Trabboch Mill, served as model for Tam; no one could be induced to sit for the Souter, whose face and figure were surreptitiously studied from two cobblers in the neighbourhood of Ayr.

The statues were secured for the Burns Monument at Alloway, and when completed were sent on tour by Auld to Ayr, Edinburgh (where they were praised by Sir Walter Scott) and Glasgow. The profits, which were equally divided among the sculptor, Auld, and the trustees of the monument, amounted to nearly £2,000.

They reached London in April 1829, and at once attracted great notice, the critics hailing them as inaugurating a new era in sculpture. Sixteen replicas, it was said, were ordered by private patrons, and reproductions on a smaller scale, but also in stone, were carried out by Thom and his brother. James Thom also produced statues of the landlord and landlady of the poem, which were grouped with the others, and several pieces of a similar class, such as "Old Mortality and his pony", which was conceived in 1830 while reading Scott's novel Old Mortality on board the packet-boat between Leith and London. A few years later a second exhibition of his work was organised in London, but proved a failure.

== In America ==
About 1836 Thom went to America in pursuit of a fraudulent agent. Recovering a portion of the money embezzled, he settled in Newark, New Jersey, where he executed replicas of his favourite groups, a statue of Burns, and various ornamental pieces for gardens. While exploring the vicinity of Newark for stone suitable for his purposes, he discovered the valuable freestone quarry at Little Falls; the stonework and much of the architectural carving of Trinity Church, New York, were contracted for by him.

He purchased a farm near Ramapo, Rockland County, New York, and seems to have abandoned sculpture. He died, of consumption, in New York on 17 April 1850.

He was married and had a son, the painter James Crawford Thom, and a daughter, Ada Crawford Thom.
