= Thom Flodqvist =

Swedish professional ice hockey centre

- Born: August 13, 1990 (age 35) Södertälje, Sweden
- Height: 5 ft 10 in (178 cm)
- Weight: 185 lb (84 kg; 13 st 3 lb)
- Position: Centre
- Shoots: Right
- Hockeyettan team Former teams: Linden Hockey; Södertälje SK
- NHL draft: Undrafted
- Playing career: 2009–present

Thom Flodqvist (born August 13, 1990) is a Swedish professional ice hockey centre who currently plays for Linden Hockey in the Hockeyettan. He previously played for Södertälje SK in the Elitserien.

== Career statistics ==
			Regular season					Playoffs
Season	Team	League	GP	G	A	Pts	PIM	GP	G	A	Pts	PIM
2005–06	Södertälje SK U16	U16 SM	3	1	4	5	27	—	—	—	—	—
2006–07	Södertälje SK J18	J18 Allsvenskan	5	4	0	4	6	—	—	—	—	—
2007–08	Södertälje SK J18	J18 Elit	20	9	11	20	10	—	—	—	—	—
2007–08	Södertälje SK J18	J18 Allsvenskan	11	5	5	10	4	2	0	2	2	30
2007–08	Södertälje SK J20	J20 SuperElit	14	2	4	6	4	—	—	—	—	—
2008–09	Södertälje SK J20	J20 SuperElit	40	13	30	43	51	2	0	1	1	0
2009–10	Södertälje SK J20	J20 SuperElit	37	27	19	46	18	—	—	—	—	—
2009–10	Södertälje SK	Elitserien	7	1	0	1	0	—	—	—	—	—
2009–10	Nyköpings HK	Division 1	6	6	5	11	0	—	—	—	—	—
2010–11	Södertälje SK J20	J20 SuperElit	2	3	1	4	0	—	—	—	—	—
2010–11	Södertälje SK	Elitserien	38	2	0	2	0	—	—	—	—	—
2010–11	IK Oskarshamn	HockeyAllsvenskan	14	4	4	8	0	—	—	—	—	—
2011–12	Södertälje SK	HockeyAllsvenskan	51	10	8	18	10	—	—	—	—	—
2012–13	Södertälje SK J20	J20 SuperElit	1	0	0	0	0	—	—	—	—	—
2012–13	Södertälje SK	HockeyAllsvenskan	33	2	6	8	8	5	0	0	0	0
2013–14	Frederikshavn White Hawks	Denmark	40	16	17	33	22	11	4	8	12	6
2014–15	Eispiraten Crimmitschau	DEL2	4	2	0	2	2	—	—	—	—	—
2014–15	Kallinge-Ronneby IF	Hockeyettan	29	11	24	35	6	2	0	0	0	4
2015–16	Kristianstads IK	Hockeyettan	35	16	20	36	14	9	4	4	8	4
2016–17	IK Pantern	HockeyAllsvenskan	12	0	3	3	4	—	—	—	—	—
2016–17	Kristianstads IK	Hockeyettan	25	14	23	37	8	14	5	10	15	4
2017–18	Södertälje SK	HockeyAllsvenskan	52	9	7	16	8	5	0	0	0	0
2018–19	Södertälje SK	HockeyAllsvenskan	21	1	1	2	4	—	—	—	—	—
2018–19	Coventry Blaze	EIHL	34	10	11	21	0	2	0	1	1	0
2019–20	Kristianstads IK	HockeyAllsvenskan	4	0	0	0	0	—	—	—	—	—
2019–20	Aalborg Pirates	Denmark	33	9	10	19	6	—	—	—	—	—
2021–22	Linden Hockey	Hockeyettan	32	13	18	31	14	—	—	—	—	—
2022–23	Linden Hockey	Hockeyettan	34	5	11	16	39	—	—	—	—	—
2023–24	Linden Hockey	Hockeyettan	29	5	15	20	4	—	—	—	—	—
Elitserien totals			45	3	0	3	0	—	—	—	—	—
HockeyAllsvenskan totals			187	26	29	55	34	10	0	0	0	0
Hockeyettan (Division 1) totals			190	70	116	186	85	25	9	14	23	12
Denmark totals			73	25	27	52	28	11	4	8	12	6
