= William Mayo (civil engineer) =

Major William Mayo (c. 1685 – October 20, 1744) was an English civil engineer who emigrated to the British colony of Virginia in 1723.

== Biography ==
Mayo, born in England, emigrated to the British colony of Virginia in 1723. Mayo was the surveyor for Virginia in the Commission of 1727. Later in 1733, he was an assistant to Colonel William Byrd in the surveying of Byrd's land holdings. In 1736, a commission of six men sent a surveying party under Mayo's leadership to explore Lord Fairfax's territory, one of three such parties outfitted at that time (see John Savage). This first survey of Fairfax's domains provided the first useful map of the region, and Mayo's journal provided most of the knowledge available to the first settlers who were then breaking through the Blue Ridge gaps into western Virginia territory. The New Creek, Mineral County area received its name from this Mayo expedition. By traveling up the north side of the Potomac River, which was easier because of the mountainous terrain on the south side, the party missed the stream which gives the town its name. On the return trip, however, the explorers discovered the stream and subsequently placed it on the map as a "new creek."

Together with Professor Alexander Irvin, Mayo was also responsible for setting the boundary between Virginia and North Carolina. One of the rivers intersecting the line was named the Mayo River in his honor.

From 1736 to 1737, Mayo laid out the city of Richmond, Virginia.

Mayo served as the chief civil engineer in Virginia until his death in Richmond in 1744. He is interred there in the Hollywood Cemetery.
