= Thorne (surname) =

Thorne is a surname of English origin, originally referring to a thorn bush. Thorne is the 1,721st most common surname name in the United States.

The Thorne family's origins date back to the period prior to the Norman Conquest of 1066, to the county of Somerset. Thorne is an English name, now found mostly in Dorset and Devon, counties on the southwestern coast of England. A knighthood was bestowed on William Thorne by Richard I of England for heroism during the Third Crusade in approximately 1199. The Thorne motto "Vincere vel Mori" translates to "Conquer or die".

Notable people with the name include:

== People ==
- Adande Thorne (born 1980), Trinidadian-American YouTube celebrity
- Alfred A. Thorne (1871–1956), British Guyanese statesman, author and activist
- Angela Thorne (1939–2023), English actor
- Ahrne Thorne (1904–1985), American newspaper editor
- Bella Thorne (born 1997), American actress, singer, and model
- Callie Thorne (born 1969), American actress
- Carlos Thorne (1923–2021), Peruvian novelist, writer and lawyer
- Chris Thorne (actor) in Shake Hands with the Devil (2007 film)
- Christopher Thorne (disambiguation)

- Christopher Thorn (musician) in Blind Melon
- Christopher Thorne (1934–1992), English historian
- Christopher Thorne, Creative Commons board member

- Courtney Thorne-Smith (born 1967), American actress
- Darren Thorne, American politician
- David Thorne (disambiguation), several people

- David Thorne (British Army officer) (1933–2000)
- David Thorne (diplomat) (born 1944), American businessman and diplomat
- David Thorne (cricketer) (born 1964), English cricketer
- David Thorne (rugby league) (born 1965), Australian rugby league footballer
- David Thorne (writer) (born 1972), Australian humourist, satirist and author

- Diana Thorne (1895–1963), American artist
- Dyanne Thorne (1936–2020), American actress, model, and showgirl
- Eric Thorne (1862–1922), English singer and actor
- Edward Thorne (disambiguation), several people:

- Edward Thorne (politician) (1746–1820), political figure in Nova Scotia
- Edward Thorne (naval officer) (1923–2013), Royal New Zealand Navy officer
- Edward Thorne (musician) (1834–1916), English classical organist

- Edwin F. Thorne (1845–1897), American stage actor
- Frank Thorne (1930–2021), American comic book artist-writer
- Gary Thorne (born 1948), American sportscaster
- Geoffrey Thorne (born 1970), American screenwriter, novelist and actor
- George Thorne (disambiguation), several people

- George Thorne (fl. 1636–1662), mayor of Reading
- George Thorne (actor) (1856–1922), English singer and actor
- George Thorne (golfer), British golfer who competed in the 1900 Summer Olympics
- George Thorne (footballer) (born 1993), English footballer for Derby County F.C.
- George Thorne (politician) (1853–1934), British solicitor and politician

- Gordon Thorne (1897–1942), English cricketer and British Army officer
- Graeme Thorne (1951–1960), Australian kidnap and murder victim
- Grahame Thorne (born 1946), New Zealand rugby player and MP
- Isabel Thorne (1834–1910), British campaigner for medical education for women
- Isai Thorne (born 2004), West Indies cricketer
- Jack Thorne (disambiguation), several people

- Jack Thorne, British writer and playwright
- Jack "Doc" Thorne, character in the novel Jurassic Park
- Jack Thorne (mathematician), British mathematician

- Jaime Thorne León (1943–2018), Peruvian lawyer and former Minister of Defence of Peru
- James Thorne (disambiguation)

- James Thorne (footballer) (born 1996), English professional footballer
- James Thorne (preacher) (1795–1872), English Methodist preacher and editor

- Jeff Thorne (1972–2025), American football player and coach
- John Thorne (disambiguation), several people

- John Thorne (American football) (born 1947), American football coach
- John Thorne (colonial administrator) (1888–1964), civil servant in the Indian Civil Service
- John Thorne (MP) in 1388, MP for Guildford
- John Thorne (writer), American culinary writer
- John Thorne (racing driver) (born 1969), British auto racing driver

- Jon Thorne, English double bassist and composer
- Juan Luis Cipriani Thorne (born 1943), Roman Catholic Cardinal Priest and Archbishop of Lima
- Julia Thorne (1944–2006), American writer and first wife of U.S. Secretary of State John Kerry
- Junaid Thorne, radical Muslim preacher from Australia
- Kip Thorne (born 1940), American theoretical physicist
- Larry Thorne, nom de guerre of Finnish mercenary Lauri Törni
- Leslie Thorne (1916–1993), British racing driver
- Lizette Thorne (1882–1970), English-born silent film actress
- Mary Evans Thorne (c. 1740–after 1813), American Methodist leader
- Matt Thorne (born 1974), English novelist
- Michael G. Thorne (born 1940), American politician
- Michelle Thorne (born 1975), British actress, director, and model
- Neil Thorne (born 1932), British Conservative Party politician
- Nola Thorne, Panamanian track and field athlete
- Norman Thorne (1902–1925), English criminal convicted of the 'Chicken run murder'
- Payton Thorne (born 2001), American football player
- Peter Thorne (disambiguation)

- Peter Thorne (Australian footballer) (born 1960), Australian rules footballer and coach
- Peter Thorne (climatologist), climatologist and professor of physical geography
- Peter Thorne (English footballer) (born 1973), English football player
- Peter Thorne (reporter), reporter and anchorman for WPIX-TV
- Peter Thorne (RAF officer) (1923–2014), fighter pilot and test pilot

- Reuben Thorne (born 1975), New Zealand rugby union player
- Robert Folger Thorne (1920–2015), American botanist
- Rhonda Thorne (born 1958), Australian squash player
- Ryan Thorne (born 1971), Canadian women's basketball coach
- Sarah Thorne (1836 - 1899), British actress
- Stan Thorne (1918–2007), British Labour Party politician
- Shane Thorne, ring name of Australian wrestler Shane Veryzer (born 1985)
- Stephen Thorne (1935–2019), British actor
- Thomas Thorne (1841–1918), English actor and theatre manager
- Thomas Woolsey Thorne (1823–1885), American police officer
- Will Thorne (1857–1946), British trade unionist and Labour Party Member of Parliament
- William Thorne (disambiguation)

- William Thorne (chronicler) (fl. 1397), English Benedictine monk
- William Thorne (orientalist) (c 1568–1630), English Hebraist
- William Thorne Sr. (c. 1616–c.1664), American Quaker, signer of the Flushing Remonstrance
- William Thorne (mayor of Brisbane), mayor of Brisbane, Queensland, Australia, 1898
- William Thorne (mayor of Cape Town) (1839–1917), mayor of Cape Town (1901–1904)
- William Henry Thorne (1844–1923), Canadian Senator for New Brunswick (1913–1923)
- William P. Thorne (1845–1928), Lieutenant Governor of Kentucky (1903–1907)
- William Thorne (philatelist) (1845–1907), American businessman and philatelist
- William V.S. Thorne (1865–1920), American tennis player
- William L. Thorne (1878–1948), American film actor
- William A. Thorne Jr., judge of the Utah Court of Appeals (2000–present)

- Willie Thorne (1954–2020), English snooker player and sports commentator
- Worley Thorne, American screenwriter, television writer, and college instructor

== Fictional characters ==
- Ser Alliser Thorne, character in the book series A Song of Ice and Fire and its television adaptation
- Chris Thorne, character in Nothing but Trouble (1991 film)
- Emily Thorne, character in the television series Revenge
- Freddie Thorne, character in the television series Peaky Blinders
- Rupert Thorne, crime boss and enemy of Batman in DC Comics publications
- Thomas Thorne, the title character of Anthony Trollope's book Doctor Thorne and its TV adaptation.
- Carswell Thorne, character in the book series The Lunar Chronicles
- Thomas Thorne, character in the television series Ghosts (2019 TV series)

== See also ==
- Doctor Thorne, novel
- Graeme Thorne kidnapping
- List of Old English (Anglo-Saxon) surnames
- Thorner (surname)
- Thorn (surname)
