= William Thorne =

William Thorne may refer to:

- William Thorne (chronicler) (fl. 1397), English Benedictine monk
- William Thorne (orientalist) (1568?–1630), English Hebraist
- William Thorne (mayor of Brisbane), mayor of Brisbane, Queensland, Australia, 1898
- William Thorne (mayor of Cape Town) (1839–1917), mayor of Cape Town (1901–1904)
- William Henry Thorne (1844–1923), Canadian Senator for New Brunswick (1913–1923)
- William P. Thorne (1845–1928), Lieutenant Governor of Kentucky (1903–1907)
- William Thorne (philatelist) (1845–1907), American businessman and philatelist
- Will Thorne (1857–1946), Member of the British Parliament
- William V.S. Thorne (1865–1920), American tennis player
- William L. Thorne (1878–1948), American film actor
- William A. Thorne Jr., judge of the Utah Court of Appeals (2000–present)
- Willie Thorne (1954–2020), English snooker player
