= Peter Thorne =

Peter Thorne may refer to:

- Peter Thorne (Australian footballer) (born 1960), Australian rules footballer and coach
- Peter Thorne (climatologist), climatologist and professor of physical geography
- Peter Thorne (English footballer) (born 1973), English football player
- Peter Thorne (reporter), reporter and anchorman for WPIX-TV
- Peter Thorne (RAF officer) (1923–2014), fighter pilot and test pilot
- Sir Peter Francis Thorne (1914–2004), British Army officer
