= David Thorne =

David Thorne may refer to:

- David Thorne (British Army officer) (1933–2000)
- David Thorne (diplomat) (born 1944), American businessman and diplomat
- David Thorne (cricketer) (born 1964), English cricketer
- David Thorne (rugby league), (born 1965), Australian rugby league footballer
- David Thorne (writer) (born 1972), Australian humourist, satirist and author
