= Thorn (surname) =

Thorn is a surname that may refer to:

== People ==
- Abigail Thorn (born 1993), British actress, YouTuber, and philosopher
- Andy Thorn (disambiguation), several people
- Brad Thorn, Australian/New Zealand rugby footballer
- Chris Thorn in Minnesota Vikings draft history
- Edward Rowland Thorn (1913–1946), British pilot
- Erin Thorn (born 1981), American basketball player
- Frank Thorn (disambiguation)
- Frank Manly Thorn (1836–1907), lawyer, politician, government official, essayist, journalist, humorist, and inventor, sixth Superintendent of the United States Coast and Geodetic Survey
- Frankie Thorn (born 1964), American actress
- Gaston Thorn (1928–2007), Luxembourg politician
- George Thorn (1838–1905), premier of Queensland, Australia
- Gerrit T. Thorn (1835–1900), American politician
- Jesse Thorn (born 1981), American public radio host and show creator
- John Thorn (disambiguation)
- Jonathan Thorn (1779–1811), U.S. Navy officer
- Jules Thorn (1899–1980), British industrialist, founder of Thorn Lighting
- Kaye Thorn, New Zealand professor of management
- Laura Thorn (born 2000), Luxembourgish singer
- Paul Thorn, American singer-songwriter
- Philip Thorn (1951–2024), English cricketer
- Rachel Thorn (born 1965), cultural anthropologist and professor
- Robyn Thorn (1945–2026), Australian swimmer and Olympic medalist
- Rod Thorn (born 1941), American basketball executive and former player
- Tracey Thorn (born 1962), English singer-songwriter
- Victor Thorn (1844–1930), prime minister of Luxembourg
- Vikki Thorn, Australian musician, member of the band The Waifs
- Viktor Thorn (Nordic combined skier) (1874–1950), Norwegian athlete
- Viktor Thorn (cross-country skier) (born 1996), in 2018 Olympics

== Fictional characters ==
- Becca Thorn, character in television series Dominion
- Charlie "Chip" Thorn, one of the protagonists in Power Rangers Mystic Force
- Damien Thorn, primary antagonist of The Omen series.

== See also ==
- Thorne (surname)
- House Thorn, fictional noble house in television series Dominion
- Thom
- Thoen (name)
- Thon (name)
