= Thorner (surname) =

Thorner is a village in West Yorkshire, England

Thorner is also a surname. Notable people with this surname include:

- Alice Thorner (1917–2005), Latvian-born social scientist, wife of Daniel
- Betty Thorner (born 1938), New Zealand cricketer
- Daniel Thorner (1915–1974), American-born economist in India, husband of Alice
- Justus Thorner (1848–1928), German-born American businessman
- Michael O. Thorner (born 20th century), British-born professor in the USA
- Sally Thorner (born 1955), American TV news journalist

== See also ==
- Thorner v Major, English land law case
- Tina Thörner (born 1966), Swedish rally co-driver
- Thorne (surname)
