= Thomas Sprott (disambiguation) =

Thomas Sprott was an English Catholic martyr of the 16th century.

Thomas Sprott may also refer to:

- Thomas Sprott (bishop) (1856–1942), Anglican priest
- Thomas Sprott (chronicler) (fl. 1292), English Benedictine chronicler
