= Northern New Mexico =

Geographic region in the state of New Mexico, United States

Coordinates: 36°13′N 106°00′W

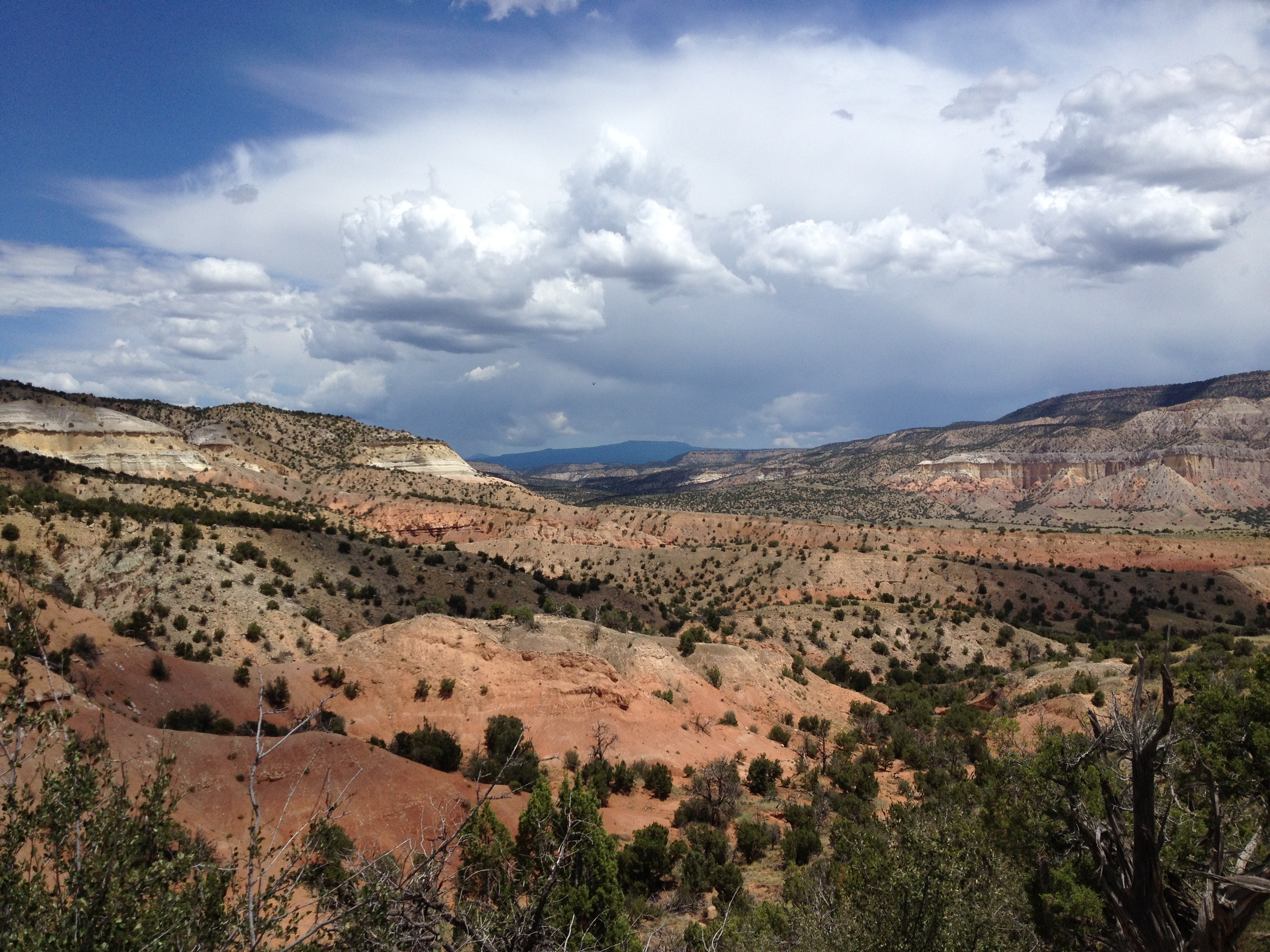
Northern New Mexico

Northern New Mexico in cultural terms usually refers to the area of heavy-Spanish settlement in the north-central part of New Mexico. However, New Mexico state government also uses the term to mean the northwest and north central, but to exclude both the northeastern high plains counties and Sandoval County. The five largest cities in northern New Mexico are: Santa Fe, Las Vegas, Española, Los Alamos, and Taos.

== Cultural ==
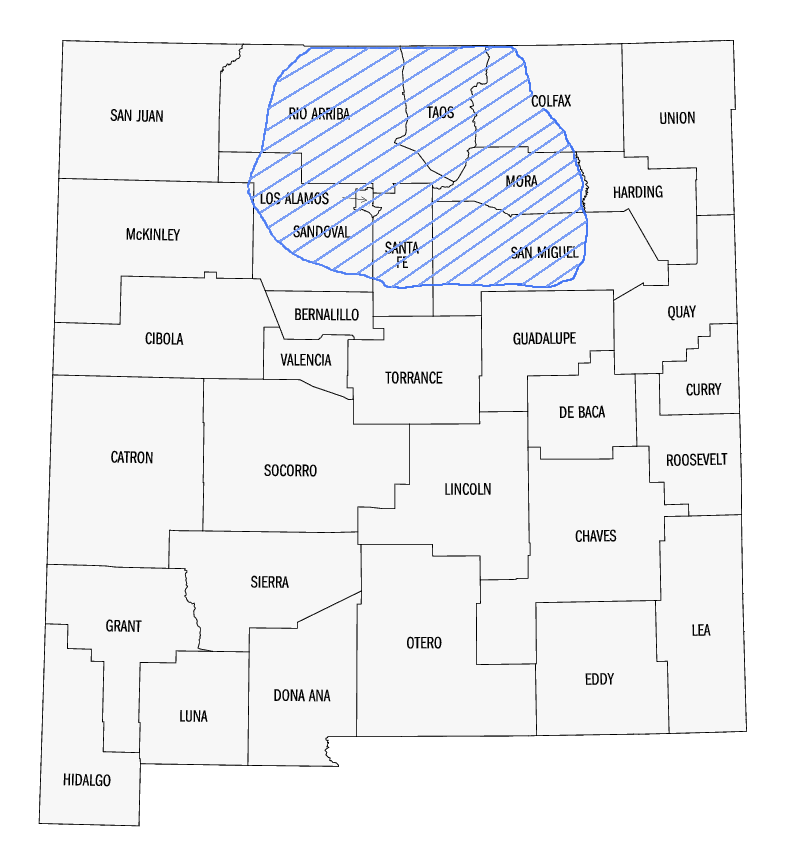
Blue hatched area shows approximate region culturally known as northern New Mexico

The traditional southern boundary of the area is an escarpment called La Bajada southwest of Santa Fe. The other boundaries are poorly defined. The map in Cobos (1983) is a guide: from La Bajada the boundary runs northwest about 50 miles (80 km) west of U.S. Routes 285 and 84, and northeast about 20 miles (30 km) east of Interstate 25, to the Colorado border. The area might also be described roughly as comprising Rio Arriba, Los Alamos, Taos, and Colfax Counties; northeastern Sandoval County, northern Santa Fe County; and western San Miguel and Mora Counties, possibly with parts of adjoining counties. To the west is the Four Corners region; to the east are the high plains of Eastern New Mexico.

While northern New Mexico, also known as the río arriba or upper river area, did receive a lot of Hispanic settlement, much Hispanic colonial settlement also occurred in southern areas, known as the río abajo or lower river. The distinction between río arriba and río abajo dates back to colonial times, and continues to be a cultural and linguistic division in New Mexican Hispano society.

== Governmental ==
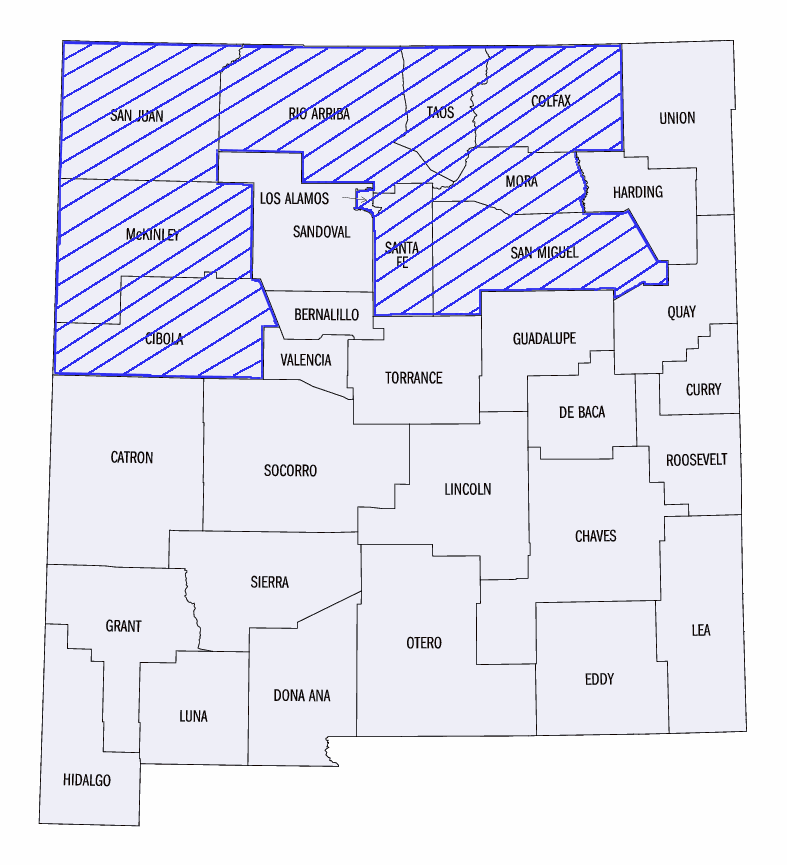
Blue hatched area shows region called Northern New Mexico in New Mexico state documents

New Mexico state government generally divides New Mexico into four regions: Eastern, Central, Southwestern and Northern New Mexico. For those purposes Northern includes the Four Corners area together with the cultural area, but excludes Sandoval County. The Northwest Region is frequently referred to as the "Four-Corners Region".

== Tourism ==
For tourists, New Mexico is divided into six regions, with northern New Mexico being divided into north central region, northeast region and northwest region. Sandoval County is part of the central region to the south. Under that schema, the north central region includes the core part of cultural northern New Mexico.

=== Northern Rio Grande National Heritage Area ===
The Northern Rio Grande National Heritage Area is in the upper Rio Grande Valley and north central region of northern New Mexico. It is a federally designated National Heritage Area. It includes the area that has been inhabited by the Puebloan peoples since the early Pre-Columbian era.

== Notable people ==
- William deBuys (born 1949), author and conservationist, resident of El Valle, Taos County
- Andrew Valdez (born 1951), juvenile court judge for Salt Lake County, Utah.

== See also ==
- New Mexico
  - List of census-designated places in New Mexico
  - List of counties in New Mexico
  - List of municipalities in New Mexico
  - New Mexico statistical areas
