= Department of Music, Durham University =

Academic department of Durham University

Coordinates: 54.775082°N 1.574678°W

Department of Music
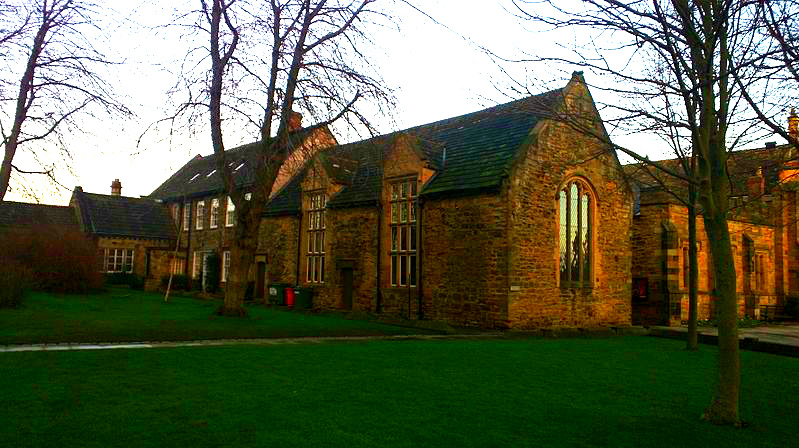
- Established: 1969
- Affiliations: University of Durham
- Academic affiliations: University of Durham
- Location: Durham University; Palace Green; Durham; DH1 3RL, Durham, England, UK
- Head of Department: Simon Mills
- Website: www.durham.ac.uk/departments/academic/music/

The Department of Music is the music school of the University of Durham.

It is one of the leading university music departments in the UK. The Department of Music offers undergraduate and postgraduate courses, but also carries out research in musicology, analysis, music technology, music psychology, ethnomusicology, composition and performance.

== History ==
Until 1889 all music degrees were honorary. Recipients of the honorary doctorates were John Bacchus Dykes in 1862 and John Stainer in 1885. There were four musicians who received a DCL prior to 1889; these were George Grove in 1875; Hubert Parry and Charles Villiers Stanford in 1894; and John Stainer in 1895. During Edward Bairstow's tenure of the Professorship, four composers were made honorary Doctors of Music; these were John Ireland in 1932; Arnold Bax in 1935; William Walton in 1937; and Thomas F. Dunhill in 1940.

From 1891 until 1980 the university offered degrees by examination only to non-resident, "unattached", students, something which had been happening in the university since 1871. Under David Greer's tenure external degrees were phased out. In the 1970s Durham became one of the first British universities to offer doctorates in music by examination. In 1991 the university celebrated 100 years of the awarding of the first music degrees.

The music degree by examination at Durham differed from those at the universities of Oxford, Cambridge and London because alongside high musical ability it only demanded general educational qualifications. At other universities such degrees required competence in classics and mathematics. Exercises in composition were required for both the BMus and DMus, and later the MMus. These degrees proved popular with professional musicians, and by the inter-war period Durham music graduates probably outnumbered those of the other English universities put together.

The music department (left) with part of Palace Green Library

=== MUSICON ===
Since 1969, the department has run MUSICON, a professional concert series for the university and city. Founded by David Lumsdaine, it has featured over 500 events including music from the middle-ages to the present day.

=== Armstrong College ===
The Music Department of Newcastle University was established in the 1890s as part of Armstrong College, itself part of the University of Durham. Prominent members of the department included W. G. Whittaker, Jack Westrup and Denis Matthews. The musicologist Henry Hadow was Principal of the College between 1909 and 1919.

== Programmes ==
The Department of Music offers a three-year BA undergraduate degree, and both taught and research postgraduate degrees, MA, MMus, and PhD. The curriculum covers all key areas of music with particular strengths in music analysis, music history, ethnomusicology, music and science and performance and composition.

=== Research ===
Major areas of research include:

- Music history
- Music analysis
- Composition
- Performance
- Ethnomusicology
- Music technology
- Music cognition

=== Reputation ===
Durham University Department of Music has been ranked as the best music department in the UK by the Complete University Guide for 2018, and has appeared number one position for two years running in the Sunday Times. The department has also been ranked 3rd in the UK for the quality and impact of its research, according to the Research Excellence Framework (REF) in 2014.

=== Academic Dress ===
The MMus and undress DMus gowns use the Oxford lay gown, which is similar in shape to the Durham masters' gown but with a flap collar covering the yoke and with inverted T-shaped armholes rather than straight horizontal cuts. Additionally there are panels of gimp near the foot of the gown and, on the DMus undress gown, on the sleeves. Instead of this panel, the MMus gown has a row of lace running from the armholes to the base of the sleeves.

Whereas the BA music degree has the same hood as any other BA at the university (black with white fur), the former BMus hood was "palatinate purple silk" (mauve) bound with brocaded white satin one inch wide. The MMus hood is brocaded white satin bound with palatinate, and the DMus hood is palatinate.

== Durham Student Music ==
Student music ensembles at Durham are run through Durham Student Music. From 1943-2015 the society was known as Durham University Music Society (DUMS), and was then changed to Music Durham under a move away from the Durham Students' Union framework. The name was changed once again in 2023 to its current affiliation, Durham Student Music. Durham Student Music is no longer part of the Durham Students' Union, but instead part of the Student Enrichment Directorate, which also manages Team Durham, formerly Durham University Athletic Union (DUAU). Most colleges have their own music societies which host concerts in chapels and halls in college. Similarly, chapel choirs are not part of Durham Student Music but instead their own respective Junior Common Room.

== Staff ==
The first professor of music was Philip Armes, who held office from 1897 to 1907. He had previously been resident examiner since 1890, alongside John Stainer, who was an external examiner. He had been appointed organist of Durham Cathedral in 1862 and was granted a Mus. Bac. ad eundem from the university in 1863 and Mus. Doc. similarly in 1874 having received them in 1858 and 1864 respectively from the University of Oxford. In 1891 he was granted an honorary MA.

The second holder of the office was Joseph Cox Bridge, whose tenure ran from 1908 to 1929. He had been organ scholar of Exeter College, Oxford and then organist of Chester Cathedral.

Edward Bairstow was professor there from 1929 to 1946, a position he held alongside his tenure of the organist post at York Minster. He was not required to be resident in Durham. Both Bridge and Bairstow died in office. During his time at Durham, Bairstow produced his Counterpoint and Harmony in 1937.

From 1947 to 1968, Arthur Hutchings was professor of music. Hutchings was the first resident professor of music at Durham. He was succeeded in 1969 by Eric Taylor, noted for his books on music theory. After Taylor's early retirement in 1985, the post was held for nine years by David Greer.

Other notable staff have included Brian Primmer, Jerome Roche (1967–1994), and Alan Thurlow (1973–1980).

Today there are around nineteen teaching staff who are supported by technical and administrative staff, and research students, including ethnomusicologist Martin Clayton.

=== Professors of Music ===
In common with other departements, until the 1990s the department had only one professor who acted as head of the department. Today the department has many professors and associate professors. The position of head of department is changed every few years.

1970–1981 David Lumsdaine

?–2016 Max Paddison

1993–present Jeremy Dibble

?–present Bennett Zon

?–present Martin Clayton

2013–present Julian Horton

2013–present Tuomas Eerola

2015?–present Richard Rijnvos

2017–present Nick Collins

2020–present Patrick Zuk

==== Heads of Department ====
1897–1907 Philip Armes

1908–1929 Joseph Cox Bridge

1929–1946 Edward Bairstow

1947–1968 Arthur Hutchings

1969–1985 Eric Robert Taylor

1986–1995 David Greer

1995–2013 Jeremy Dibble

2013–2016 Julian Horton

2016–2017 Jeremy Dibble

2017–2020 Tuomas Eerola

2020–2021 Julian Horton

2021–present Laura Leante

== Buildings ==
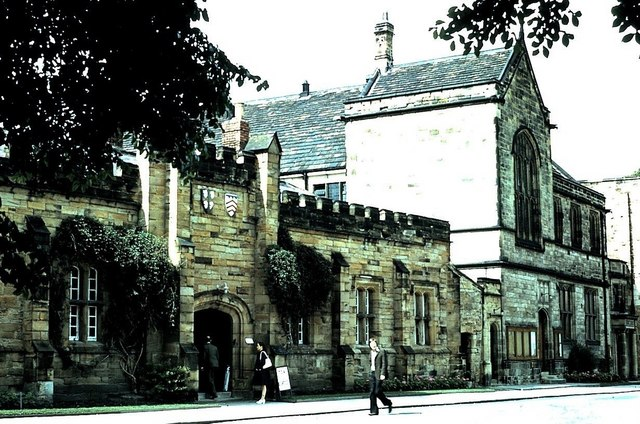
The department Computer Room (formerly department library) and the Palace Green Library in 1973

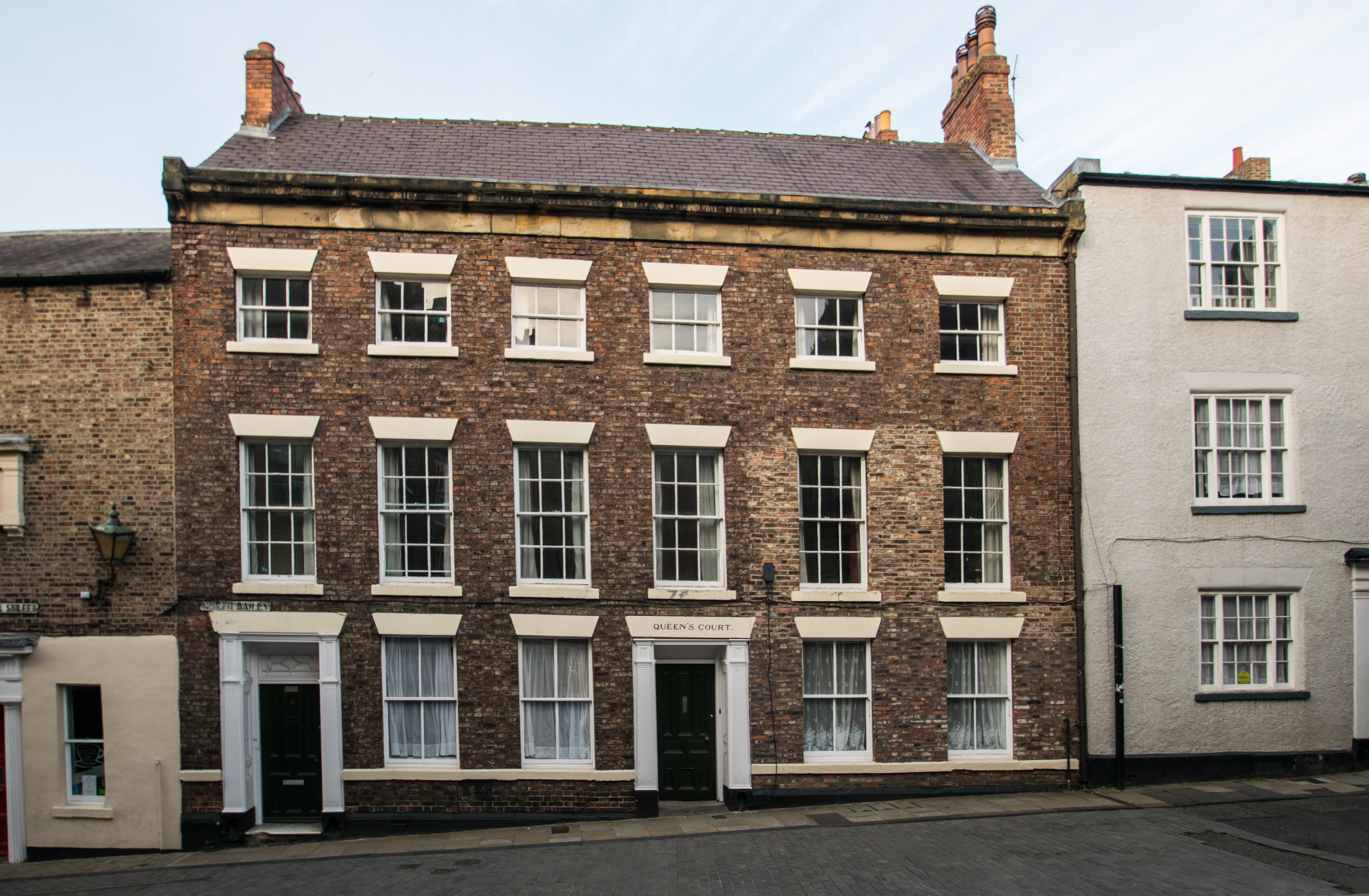
Until 2013 the department occupied part of Queen's Court, at No 2, North Bailey

The department occupies three listed buildings in the city of Durham, two on the west side of Palace Green and one on North Bailey.

The main building, Divinity House, was rebuilt in 1661 and until 1844 was home to Durham School, and is a grade II* listed building and a scheduled ancient monument. The building, which comprises the schoolroom and schoolmaster's house, has a sandstone elevation to Palace Green with parts of the schoolmaster's house having ashlar and red sandstone. The seventeenth century core was renovated in 1844 by George Pickering, cathedral clerk of works. Pickering's renovation included the renewal of the large transomed and mullioned windows on the north side of the main one-storey schoolroom, now the main lecture room. The dado of the schoolroom is panelled, and though overpainted with black paint, generations of boys' graffiti can be seen. The schoolmaster's house was altered in the eighteenth century and incorporates good interior woodwork, such as Corinthian columns surrounding the fireplace in the main room, and many surviving architraves. An extension to the west was added in 1899. The building was converted for use as the university department of music in 1966 by Bernard Taylor & Partners. Divinity House houses the department's performance hall, which can seat 60 people in the main auditorium and another 25 in a gallery.

Until recently the adjacent former Diocesan Registry housed the department library; it is now the computer room. Built in 1820 the building is constructed in an earlier style with Tudor arches and drip-mould hooded windows.

The building on North Bailey, numbers 48 and 49, comprises two inter-connected brick-built Georgian townhouses.

The department formerly had offices in Queen's Court, at 2 North Bailey (until 2013) and 6 Owengate.

== Alumni ==
Some well-known alumni of the Music Department include:

- Frederick G. Shinn, Mus. Bac., 1892; Mus. Doc., 1897; later Honorary Secretary of the Royal College of Organists
- Edward C. Bairstow, Mus. Bac., 1894; Mus. Doc., 1900; later Professor of Music
- Ernest Farrar, matriculated 1904; did not graduate
- W. G. Alcock, Mus. Doc., 1905
- E. Percy Hallam, Mus. Bac., 1906
- Ernest Bullock, Mus. Bac., 1908; Mus. Doc., 1914
- Malcolm Sargent, Mus. Bac., 1914; Mus. Doc., 1919
- W. G. Whittaker, Mus. Doc., 1921 (Armstrong College)
- Herbert Sumsion, Mus. Bac., 1921
- Gordon Slater, Mus. Doc., 1923
- C. S. Lang, Mus. Doc., 1924
- Desmond McMahon, Mus. Bac., 1927
- Alwyn Surplice, Mus. Bac., 1937
- Sidney Campbell, Mus. Doc., 1946
- Clifford Harker, Mus. Bac., 1947
- C. H. Jaeger, Mus. Bac., 1949
- John Joubert, Mus. Bac., 1950
- Lionel Dakers, Mus. Bac., 1951
- Arthur Wills, Mus. Bac., 1952; D. Mus., 1958
- Francis Jackson, D. Mus., 1957
- Michael Fleming, Mus. Bac.,1958
- Ralph Allwood, BA, 1972
- Robin Walker, BA, 1974
- James MacMillan, BA, 1984, PhD, 1987
- J. P. E. Harper-Scott, BA, 1998

The earlier of these alumni were "unattached" students and completed their papers away from Durham.
