= Edward Thorne =

Edward Thorne may refer to:

- Edward Thorne (politician) (1746–1820), political figure in Nova Scotia
- Edward Thorne (naval officer) (1923–2013), Royal New Zealand Navy officer
- Edward Thorne (musician) (1834–1916), English classical organist
