= Senator Thorne =

Senator Thorne may refer to:

- Darren Thorne (fl. 2020s), West Virginia State Senate
- Michael G. Thorne (born 1940), Oregon State Senate
- William Henry Thorne (1844–1923), Senate of Canada

== See also ==
- Gerrit T. Thorn (1832–1900), Wisconsin State Senate
