= Michael N. Martinez =

First Hispanic man to practice law in Utah

- Born: 1949 (age 76–77); New Mexico
- Education: University of Utah
- Occupation: Attorney at law
- Known for: First Hispanic to practice law in Utah
- Children: Andrew Martinez, Matthew Martinez, Lizzie Martinez

Michael N Martinez (born 1949) was the first Hispanic American lawyer in Utah. He went on to a long career in the law working in both government and private practice. He was a "vocal minority rights advocate" during his career, serving on many boards and commissions dedicated to furthering the rights of Hispanics and other people of color.

He was the first minority to be appointed to the Utah State Bar Commission, and went on to help found the Utah Minority Bar Association. He also served as President of the National Hispanic Bar Association from 1987-1988.

He hosted his own call-in radio show on KSL-Radio called "Perspective" and had his own column for both the Deseret News and the Salt Lake Tribune.

His professional papers are archived at the J. Willard Marriott Library in the Special Collections at the University of Utah.

== Early life ==
Michael Martinez was born in New Mexico to parents Nelson and Leonila. His parents moved to Utah when he was a young boy for the job opportunities; his father was a miner at the Bingham copper mine. He spent his childhood in Lark, Utah, a mining town later purchased by Kennecott Copper Mine. He is the oldest of five children. During high school, he worked at Welch's Lumber Mill as part of the school's on the job training program.

He served in the 1st Cavalry during the Vietnam War from 1969-1971.

== Education ==
He graduated from Bingham High School in May 1967. After serving in the Vietnam War, he used his G.I. Bill benefits to enroll at the University of Utah. Michael Martinez was the third Hispanic person to graduate from the University of Utah School of Law, in 1976. He graduated early in January 1976 and was admitted to the bar in April 1976.

== Career ==
After graduating from the S.J. Quinney College of Law at the University of Utah and passing the bar, Michael Martinez became the first practicing Hispanic lawyer in the state. He credits the diligence of law professor Lionel Frankel who took in an interest in him and other minority students, helping them navigate the bureaucracy of the school.

Michael Martinez began his career in the office of the Attorney General. He served as Assistant Utah Attorney General.

He was appointed by President Ronald Reagan as Deputy General Counsel of the Equal Opportunity Commission In 1982. He supervised all of the government's attorneys who handled employment discrimination law for two years. He was co-workers with Clarence Thomas and Anita Hill. Thomas was serving as chairman of the U.S. EEOC

In 1983, he co-chaired national hearings regarding the discrimination of Hispanics by the EEOC, which culminated in hearings before the U.S. Senate.

In 1984, he returned to Utah when he was appointed as Chief Deputy Salt Lake County Attorney, working under the elected County Attorney Ted Cannon. He supervised all criminal and civil litigation.

As the President of the National Hispanic Bar Association, he gave testimony at the 1987 U.S. Senate hearings on the confirmation of Anthony Kennedy to the U.S. Supreme Court. Along with Antonia Hernandez, who was President and General Counsel of the Mexican-American Legal Defense Fund, they raised doubts about Judge Kennedy's civil rights positions. It was the first time the Hispanic organizations had been asked to weigh in on a Supreme Court nomination. Joe Biden was chair of the Senate Judicial Hearings

He went on to found his own private practice where he focused on representing Spanish-speaking clients. He operated it from 1988-2010 and was active in Utah politics.

In 1992, he helped to found the Utah Minority Bar Association along with 60 other minority lawyers, and he served as President in 1993. He was also appointed as the first minority member of the Utah State Bar Association, which governs all Utah attorneys.

=== Notable cases ===
La Diana Panaderia Raid: Martinez was the attorney representing a Latino-owned tortilla factory, bakery, and restaurant in Salt Lake City named La Diana in a civil rights case. On April 24, 1997, the Salt Lake City Police Department joined with the Drug Enforcement Association, Immigration and Naturalization Services (INS), and the Federal Bureau of Investigation (FBI) for the largest drug raid at the time. It was a no-knock search warrant, and during the process nearly every person present (80 people) was detained, some for as long as three hours. They used 47 SWAT team members for the raid and detained people in the store, the restaurant, and the tortilla factory, including the owner's young children, ages 6 and 11. The DEA believed La Diana was a hub for drug dealing, however, it was never confirmed that anyone related to La Diana (owner or employees) was involved in selling or buying drugs. Michael Martinez represented the panaderia owner and employees who were arrested. No one was convicted, and payments were made for false arrests. Salt Lake City paid nearly $600,000 to settle the lawsuit.

Martinez v Mary Callaghan: Michael Martinez sued Mary Callaghan, a former Salt Lake County Commissioner, for violating her campaign promises. Callaghan promised voters when she ran for office in 1998 that she would not take any severance payments if her term was shortened due to a decision to switch from commission to mayor-council governance structure. However, after such a switch was made, Callaghan accepted a $279,500 severance package for her term ending after two years, instead of four years. Martinez sued to demand Callaghan return the money and for damages. He argued she should "be held accountable for the promise" and that "voters should be able to trust their elected officials." She was acquitted of charges.

State of Utah v Nancy Workman, Mayor: District Attorney David Yocom appointed Michael Martinez to be independent special prosecutor during the trial of then Salt Lake County Mayor Nancy Workman. Workman, a Republican, was accused of misusing funds to pay for an employee at a local chapter of the Boys and Girls Clubs of America where her daughter worked in the finance office. She faced two felony charges of misusing county funds. Before the jury returned, Martinez offered to reduce the two felonies to class B misdemeanors, but Workman refused the deal. Workman was found not guilty of all charges by the jury. The jury couldn't see Workman as a felon and wasn't willing to send her to serve time in prison. "Juries have compassion," Martinez said. "They see people as people; they relate to them as human beings. They hear everything (that's presented) and do what they think is fair. That's what they did here. I'm fine with it."

== Professional service ==
- Hispanic National Bar Association, President, 1987-1988
- Governor Norm Bangerter appointed him to serve on the Salt Lake Community College Board of Trustees in 1991; he served two four-year terms (1991-1999)
- President of the Utah Minority Bar, 1993
- Small Business Administration Board, member
- Small Business Administration Fairness Board
- U.S. Senate Task Force on Hispanics
- Utah Advisory Committee for the U.S. Commission on Civil Rights, elected Chairman of the committee (1998)
- Utah Job Service Advisory Committee
- Governor's Hispanic Advisory Committee, chairman
- University of Utah Health Sciences and Hospital Advisory Board
- Women's Business Center Advisory Board
- Multi-Ethnic Board of the Salt Lake Chamber of Commerce
- Regional Regulatory Fairness Board Member

== Professional recognition ==
- Utah State Bar Raymond S. Uno Award for Advancement of Minorities in the Law, 1997
- Utah Minority Bar Association, 2011, Honoring the original founders of the association
- Honored with the Cesar Chavez Award at the 2nd Annual Cesar Chavez Peace and Justice Awards Luncheon for his work with Utah's Hispanic community providing legal services, often to non-English speakers

== Advocacy ==
Michael Martinez has been a vocal advocate for increasing minority representation in the judiciary. He wrote an op-ed about it in the Deseret News. He was appointed as the first minority member of the Utah State Bar Commission. His advocacy built on the work of the Utah Task Force on Racial and Ethnic Fairness in the Legal System (Spring 1998), which reviewed the judicial appointment process and the number of minority judges appointed to the bench.

Another area of advocacy was to expose how city courts issued traffic tickets solely to generate revenue, not to further justice, arguing that city judges are city employees, not members of the judicial branch of government. He was published in the Utah Bar Journal in April 2009.
