= List of first minority male lawyers and judges in Utah =

This is a list of the first minority male lawyer(s) and judge(s) in Utah. It includes the year in which the men were admitted to practice law (in parentheses). Also included are men who achieved other distinctions such becoming the first in their state to graduate from law school or become a political figure.

== Firsts in Utah's history ==
=== Lawyers ===
- First African American male: Lawrence Marsh (1909)
- First Japanese American male: Yoshio Katayama (1946)
- First Native American males admitted to the Utah State Bar: Thomas G. Nelford and Larry Echo Hawk (1973)
- First Hispanic American males admitted to the Utah State Bar: Melvin H. Martinez (1975), Armando R. Ibañez (1975), and Michael N. Martinez (1976). Martinez was the first minority male to sit on the Utah State Bar Commission.
- First Tongan American male: Phil Uipi (1986)

=== State judges ===
- First Asian American male (Japanese descent): Raymond Uno (1959)
- First African American male: Tyrone Medley (1977) in 1984
- First Native American (Pomo) male: William A. Thorne Jr. (1977) in 1986
- First Hispanic American male: Andrew Valdez (1977) in 1993
- First Chinese American male: Michael Kwan in 1998
- First Native American (Pomo) male (Utah Court of Appeals): William A. Thorne Jr. (1977) in 2000
- First Greek American male (Utah Supreme Court): Deno Himonas in 2015

=== Federal judges ===
- First Hispanic American male (U.S. District Court for the District of Utah): Samuel Alba (1980)

=== Attorney General of Utah ===
- First Asian American male (Filipino descent): Sean Reyes (1997) in 2013

=== Assistant Attorney General ===
- First African American male: Henry Lee Adams

=== State Bar of Utah ===
- First minority male (who is of Latino descent) elected to the Utah State Bar Commission: C. Dane Nolan c. 2001
- First minority male (who is of Asian descent) president: Augustus Chin in 2006

== Firsts in local history ==
- Joseph Greco: First male lawyer of Italian descent in Carbon County, Utah
- Henry Lee Adams: First African American male to graduate from the University of Utah's S.J. Quinney College of Law (1959) [Salt Lake County, Utah]
- Robert Archuleta: First Latino American male to graduate from the University of Utah's S.J. Quinney College of Law (1974) [Salt Lake County, Utah]
- Keith N. Hamilton: First African American male to graduate from the J. Reuben Clark Law School of Brigham Young University [Utah County, Utah]

== See also ==
- List of first minority male lawyers and judges in the United States

== Other topics of interest ==
- List of first women lawyers and judges in the United States
- List of first women lawyers and judges in Utah
