= Joseph Cox Bridge =

English organist and composer (1853–1929)

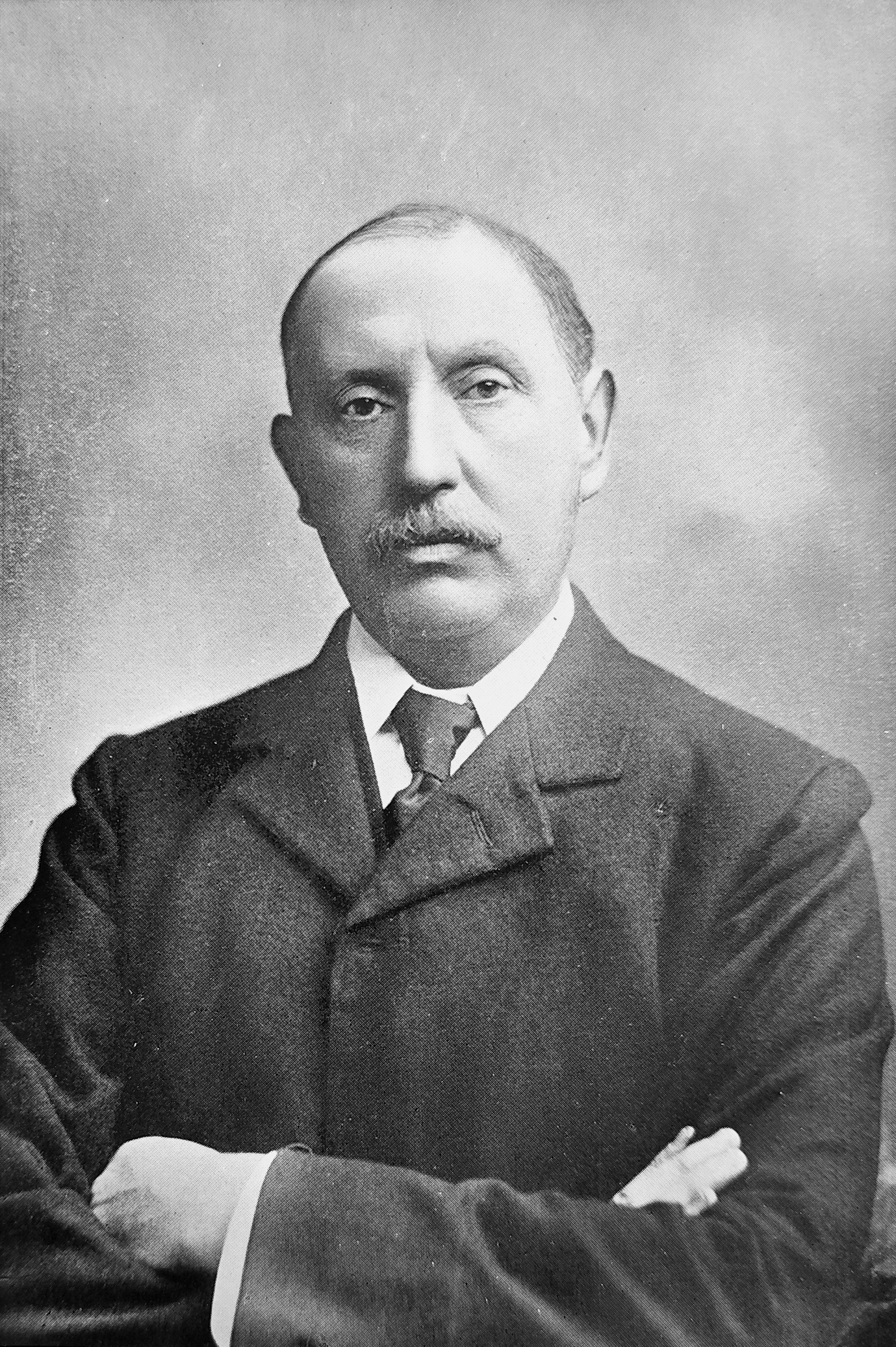
Portrait of Joseph Cox Bridge

Joseph Cox Bridge (16 August 1853 – 29 March 1929) was an English organist, conductor, composer, musical antiquarian, and academic.

== Biography ==
Bridge was born at Rochester, Kent, the third son of John Bridge a lay clerk at the Cathedral. He was a chorister at Rochester Cathedral (1862-1867), where he studied under John Hopkins, attending the cathedral school; became assistant organist at Manchester Cathedral (1867-1869) to his elder brother Frederick Bridge; then served as assistant organist at Rochester Cathedral (1869-1871).

Bridge attended, and was organist of Exeter College, Oxford (1871-1876); where he graduated B.A. (1875), Mus.B. (1876), M.A. (1878), and Mus.D. (1885).

In 1876 Bridge was appointed assistant organist of Chester Cathedral, and became organist of the same in 1877. There he revived the Chester Triennial Music Festival in 1879. Bridge became a Fellow of the Royal College of Organists in 1879. He founded the Chester Musical Society in 1883. He was the conductor of the Bradford Festival Choral Society (1886-1889).

Bridge was one of two sub conductors, alongside Sir George Martin, assisting his brother Sir Frederick Bridge at the Coronation of Edward VII and Alexandra in 1902. In 1905 he was elected a Fellow Society of Antiquaries and served on the council for two years. Bridge was an Honorary Member of the Royal Academy of Music.

In 1908, he was appointed Professor of Music at Durham University. In 1911 Bridge again served as assistant conductor alongside Sir George Martin and Sir Walter Parratt, to Sir Frederic Bridge at the Coronation of George V and Mary. After retiring as cathedral organist in 1925, Bridge then became Principal of Trinity College of Music London. He was President of the Royal Musical Association, retiring from this post some six months before his death. Joseph Cox Bridge died 29 March 1929 at St Albans.

== Scholarship ==
Bridge read history at Oxford, achieving a Bachelor of Arts as his first degree. Bridge was an early scholar of the recorder, drawing attention to the instrument with his research and lectures in the 1890s and early 1900s He composed the first twentieth-century work for the recorder in 1901, the first composition written during instrument's revival. The Yale book of quotations attributes "Love 'em and leave 'em." to Bridge's 1917 book Cheshire Proverbs.

=== Publications and Papers ===
- A Short Sketch of the Chester Musical Festivals, 1772 to 1829 (1891). Chester: Phillipson & Golder.
- "Recorders or Ancient Flutes" (21 February 1891). National Society of Professional Musicians, monthly meeting, Chester.
- Three lectures on 'Music of the Past' (1892), presented at Chester, 22, 29 November and 9 December; and at Liverpool 24, 1 and 8 November December.
- Words of the anthems in use in the Cathedral Church of Chester (1895). Chester: Phillipson & Golder.
- "Samuel Pepys and his Musick" (24 February 1896). Chester Archaeological Society.
- "Two Chester Madrigal Writers: Thomas Bateson and Francis Pilkington" (1897). Journal of the Chester Archaeological Society. New series, vol. 6 (1), pp. 60-73.
- "Souling Songs" (1897). Journal of the Chester Archaeological Society. New series, vol. 6 (1), pp. 74-75.
- "Notes on the "Crwth" and "Pibcorn"" (1899). Journal of the Chester Archaeological Society. New series, vol. 6 (2), pp. 141-144.
- "The Chester Recorders" (1901). Proceedings of the Musical Association 27th Session. pp. 109-120.
- "Ludlow and the Masque of Comus" (1903). Journal of the Chester Archaeological Society. New series, vol. 9, pp. 20-45.
- "The Chester miracle plays; some facts concerning them, and the supposed authorship of Ralph Higden" (1903). Journal of the Chester Archaeological Society. New series vol. 9, pp. 59-98.
- "Horns" (1905). Journal of the Chester Archaeological Society. New series vol.11, pp. 85-166.
- Three Chester Whitsun Plays (1906). Chester: Phillipson & Golder.
- "Two Cheshire Soldiers of Fortune of the XIV. Century: Sir Hugh Calveley & Sir Robert Knolles." (1908). Journal of the Chester Archaeological Society. New series, vol. 14, pp. 112-232.
- "Three Chester Whitsun Plays" (1908). Journal of the Chester Archaeological Society. New series vol. 14, pp. i-lxv.
- "The diary of Nehemiah Griffith, esq, of Rhual, Mold, for the year 1715" (1909). Journal of the Chester Archaeological Society. New series vol. 15, pp. 22-47.
- "The 1715 rebellion: letters from John Rutherford, esq, of Knowsouth, a Scotch prisoner of war at Liverpool, and from William Elliott, esq, relative to his release" (1909). Ed. Journal of the Chester Archaeological Society. New series vol. 15, pp. 48-54.
- "Chester Miracle Plays." (1910) Memorials of old Cheshire. London G. Allen. pp. 142-179.
- "Some Cheshire Customs, Proverbs and Folk-lore" (1910). Memorials of old Cheshire. London G. Allen. pp. 230-263.
- "A Great English Choir-trainer: Captain Henry Cooke" (1910). The Musical Antiquary Volume 2. pp.61-79.
- "Mr. Pepys and his Office Boys" (1912). The Cornhill Magazine. Vol. 33, p. 77.
- "The organists of Chester Cathedral" (1913). Journal of the Chester Archaeological Society. New series vol. 19 (2), pp. 63-124.
- The organists of Chester Cathedral (1913). Chester: G. R. Griffith.
- "Items of Expenditure from the 16th Century Accounts of the Painters. Glaziers, Embroiders, and Stationers' Company, with special reference to the "Shepherds' play"" (1914). Journal of the Chester Archaeological Society. New series, vol. 20, pp. 153-191.
- "A Musical Trio: Captain Cooke, Tom Edwards, and Mr. Pepys." (1917). Occasional papers read by members at meetings of the Samuel Pepys club. Vol. 1, pp. 123-129.
- Cheshire proverbs and other sayings and rhymes (1917). Chester: Phillipson & Golder; London: Simpkin, Marshall.
- "Kenrick Edisbury (Surveyor of the Navy, 1632-1638), and his descendants; being a brief account of the family of Edisbury of Marchwiel, Co. Denbigh" (1918). Journal of the Chester Archaeological Society. New series, vol. 22, pp. 26-54.
- "Town Waits and Their Tunes" (1927). Proceedings of the Musical Association 54th Session. pp. 63-92.

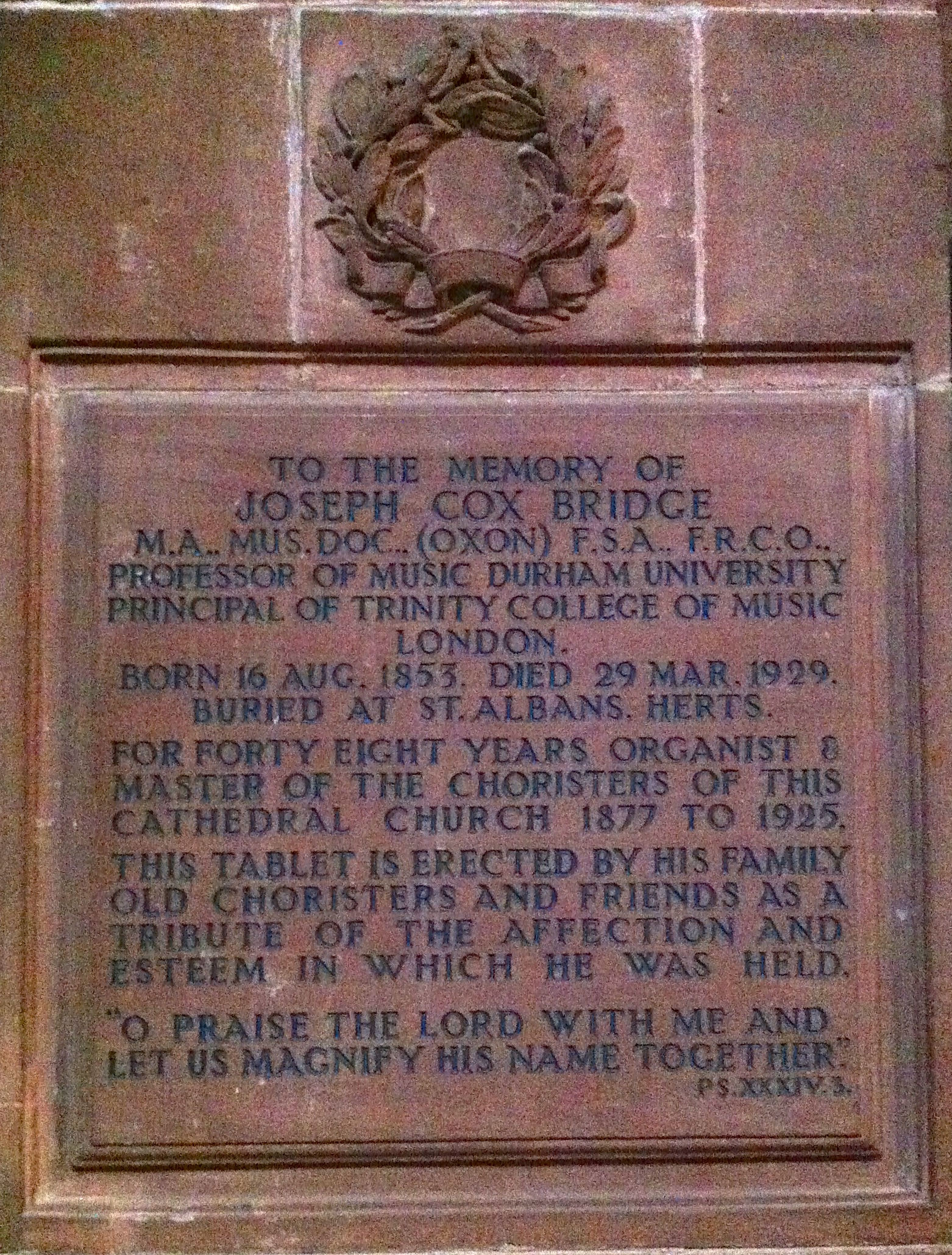
Memorial to Joseph Cox Bridge in Chester Cathedral

== Music ==
The following list of Bridges' compositions and arrangements are grouped by genre or ensemble and arranged in chronological order. This list is not exhaustive

=== Larger works ===
- Praise, a Sacred Cantata, words from Psalm 145, verse 10, etc. (1876).
- Magnificat and Nunc Dimittis, in C, for voice and orchestra (1879).
- Symphony in F for orchestra (1894).
  1. Allegro moderato - "The Great Midsummer Fair,"
  2. Intermezzo - "Hunting Scene" (fp. "Le Gros Veneur, A Woodland Scene,")
  3. Scherzo and Trio - "The Mystery Plays,"
  4. Andante - "The River Dee,"
  5. March - "The Siege of Chester," (omitted after fp.)
  6. Allegro moderato - "The Abbey of St. Werburgh"
- Daniel, an Oratorio (1885)
- Rudel, a Dramatic Cantata, words by Frederic Weatherly (1891).
- Resurgam, a Sacred Cantata for soloists (contralto and tenor), chorus and orchestra words by Gerard Moultrie (1897).
- Requiem for soloists, chorus and orchestra (1900).

==== Incidental music ====
- Waits' Tunes (1910), arr. for Chester Historical Pageant
- Dramatised Scenes from "The Pilgrim's Progress," by E.A. Rudd (published in 1912)

=== Part-songs ===
- Greek War Song, part-song for male voices, words by Byron (1877).
- It was a lover, part-song for SATB, words by Shakespeare (1883).
- Great Britain's Sons and Daughters, Jubilee part song for SATB, words by E. M. Southwell (1887).
- The Curfew Bell, part song, words by Gray (1887).
- The Steersman's Song, words by T. Moore. (1888)
- Love, unaccompanied part-song for SATB, words by R. Jones (1904)
- The Miller of the Dee, old ballad, arr. for SATB (1910), for Chester Historical Pageant.
- The Miller of the Dee, old ballad, arr. for men's voices (1910)
- The Cheshire Cheese, old song, arr. for SATB (1910), for Chester Historical Pageant
- Come, lasses and lads, old song, arr. for SATB (1910), for Chester Historical Pageant
- Joan to the maypole, old song, arr. for SATB (1910), for Chester Historical Pageant
- Hobby Horse Song, old song, arr. for SATB (1910), for Chester Historical Pageant
- Ode to the City of Chester, old song, arr. for SATB (1910), for Chester Historical Pageant

=== Anthems ===
- O that men would praise the Lord, Anthem for Harvest Festivals (1886).
- Be joyful in God all ye Lands, Harvest Anthem (1893).
- Break forth into Joy, Anthem for four voices (1895)
- Christ is risen, Easter anthem (ca.1900)
- Supplication for His Most Gracious Majesty, the King. ed. Bridge (1902)

=== Christmas Carols ===
1. On Christmas Night, words by Gerard Moultrie (1892).
2. Away with Grief, words by Gerard Moultrie (1893)
3. The Merry Christmas Morn, words by Gerard Moultrie (1894)
4. Holy Night, words by Mary Dunlop Moultrie (1894)
5. Awake the Voice! (S.S.A.) words by Robert Herrick (1897)
6. Christmas in the Fields, Béarnaise Melody words adapted by Mrs. H. Sandford, (1902)
7. When Christ was born, Chester Mystery Play (1908)
8. Rejoice with Heart and Voice, Old French Melody, words by Robert Herrick (1910)
9. The Shepherds' Carol, Coventry Mystery Play (1912)
10. Lullaby, Coventry Mystery Play (1912)
11. Across the Snow, words by Sandys Wason (1913)
12. The Shepherds had an Angel (S.S.), words by Christina Rossetti (1916).
13. On Bethlehem's Hill, words by K. L. Hoare (1922)

=== Other Choral Music ===
- Canadian Sleigh Song, for SATB words by Charles Mackay (1888).
- Soldiers of the heavenly King. Hymn, words by I. E. (1906)
- God save the King, arr. for SATB. (1910)
- Founders' Hymn, song (1910), written for Chester Historical Pageant
- Chorus of Monks, chorus (1910), written for Chester Historical Pageant

==== Liturgical Settings ====
- Te Deum Laudamus (1911)

=== Vocal Music ===
- At the Mermaid Tavern, an album of four songs, for bass or baritone (1918).
  1. The mermaid tavern words by Keats
  2. Westward ho! words by Charles Kingsley
  3. The clear cavalier words by Samuel Butler
  4. Sir Eglamore words by anonymous

=== Solo and Chamber Music ===
==== Organ ====
- Four select pieces arranged for the Organ (1882)
  - Bourrée (from Organ Concerto, Op.7, No.1, HWV 309), Handel
  - Romance Affettuoso (from Pianoforte Concerto in C minor, Op.48, No.5), Johann Baptist Cramer
  - Message (No.18 from Albumblätter, Op.124), Robert Schumann
  - Overture to Œtius, Handel
- Original Compositions for the Organ (1886).
  1. Andante con moto in F.
  2. Finale (in the French style) in A.
  3. Andante in E flat.
  4. Quasi Pastorale in A.
  5. Andante in D.
  6. Fanfare in D.
- Evening Hymn for organ (1895).
- Idylle for organ (1895).
- Overture in G major for organ (1896).
- Song of Peace for organ (ca.1915)

==== Pianoforte ====
- Bourrée and Gigue for pianoforte (1877)
- Danses sclave, pianoforte duets (1886)
- Polonaise for pianoforte (1888).
- Dance of Mummers for pianoforte (1888).
- Bourrée and Gigue in the old style for pianoforte (1889)

==== Other ====
- String Quartet "Che tara tara" (1879).
- Sonata for violoncello and piano (1883).
  1. Allegro Moderato
  2. Andante con Moto
  3. Scherzo and Trio
  4. Allegro
- Quartet for Recorders (1901).

=== Operetta ===
- The Belle of the Area (1890) libretto founded on The area belle: an original farce in one act by William Brough and Andrew Halliday additional lyrics by Edward Ould.

== Notes ==
Cultural offices
Preceded by Frederick Gunton	Organist and Master of the Choristers of Chester Cathedral; 1877–1925	Succeeded by John Hughes
