= Samuel Alba =

United States magistrate judge

Magistrate Judge of the United States District Court for the District of Utah
- In office 1992 – June 30, 2012

Personal details
- Born: 1947 (age 78–79)
- Education: Utah State University (B.S.); Arizona State University College of Law (J.D.)

Samuel Alba (born 1947) is a former United States magistrate judge for the United States District Court for the District of Utah.

== Early life and education ==
Alba was born in 1947.

Alba graduated from Utah State University in 1969 with a bachelor's degree in political science. He graduated from the Arizona State University College of Law in 1972.

== Career ==
From 1972 to 1977, Alba worked at the Federal Public Defenders' Office in Phoenix, Arizona. From 1977 to 1980, Alba worked at the Phoenix law firm of Gama, Iniguez, Guerrero & Albaal, where he practiced in the area of personal injury and criminal defense.

On October 8, 1980, Alba was admitted to the Utah State Bar. From 1980 to 1987, Alba worked as first assistant and then chief of the criminal section at the U.S. Attorney's Office for the District of Utah in Salt Lake City. From 1987 to 1992, Albra was a shareholder at the Salt Lake City firm of Yeates, Prince, and Geldzhaler, practicing in the areas of commercial litigation and white-collar criminal defense.

=== Federal judicial service ===
Alba was a federal magistrate judge for the United States District Court for the District of Utah from August 1992 to 2012. He was chief magistrate judge from 2003 to 2008. He served on the Judicial Conference Committee on Defender Services, and is co-chair of the building committee for the District of Utah. He retired from the bench on June 30, 2012.

Alba has been involved in several notable court cases:

- In 2008, Alba conducted pretrial matters in the Elizabeth Smart kidnapping case, and ordered Brian David Mitchell, the man charged in the kidnapping, to undergo a mental competency evaluation to determine he was fit to stand trial before the case went before Judge Dale A. Kimball.
- In 2009, following a plea agreement, Alba sentenced two men, Rulon Kody Sommerville and Kevin Shumway, to a year of probation in a case in which some two dozen people from San Juan County were charged with stealing ancient artifacts from federal lands.
- In 2010, Alba approved a plea deal in the high-profile Bugman Pest and Lawn case, in which the fumigation company and its ex-employee Coleman Nocks faced federal charges of unlawful use of a registered pesticide that was connected to the deaths of two young girls in Layton, Utah. After accepting the plea deal, the case went to U.S. District Judge Dee Benson.
- In 2010, Alba presided over Phillips Electrical v. BC Technical case, involving claims of copyright infringement, trademark infringement, and misappropriation of trade secrets, among others. After an evidentiary hearing, Alba issued a 117-page report and recommendation on the discovery, finding that defendant had intentionally destroyed evidence, recommending that the defendant's answer to the plaintiff's complaint be stricken and default entered against the defendant, and ordered the defendant to pay the plaintiff's attorney fees in the sum of $294,694. Alba's report and recommendation was adopted in its entirety by Judge Clark Waddoups in February 2011.

On 2005, the Utah Minority Bar Association honored Alba as one of the first 50 minority lawyers in Utah. In 2009, Alba was included in Latinos in Utah, book recognizing the contributions made by Latinos in the State of Utah. In 2010, Alba delivered a speech entitled "The Changing Face of Law in Latin America" as part of Utah State University's College of Humanities and Social Sciences Distinguished Alumni Speaker series.

== Personal life ==
Alba was married to Nancy Alba until she died from breast cancer in 1992. Alba later married Anne Swensen. He has four children and eight grandchildren.

== See also ==
- List of Hispanic and Latino American jurists
- List of first minority male lawyers and judges in Utah
