= Christopher Thorn =

Christopher Thorn(e) or Chris Thorn(e) may refer to:

- Christopher Thorn (musician) in Blind Melon
- Christopher Thorne, historian
- Christopher Thorne, Creative Commons board member
- Chris Thorne (actor) in Shake Hands with the Devil (2007 film)
- Chris Thorn in Minnesota Vikings draft history
- Chris Thorne, character in Nothing but Trouble (1991 film)
