= Andrew Valdez =

American judge

Andrew A. Valdez (born October 17, 1951) is a Utah Third District Juvenile Court judge for Salt Lake County, Utah.

Valdez was born in Northern New Mexico and then migrated to Utah where he was educated in the Utah public school system before attending the University of Utah and later the S.J. Quinney College of Law. After being admitted to the Utah bar, Valdez was a public defender for two years before becoming a part of the Judge Advocate General's Corps (JAG corps) where Valdez spent three and a half years in Central Europe. When Valdez returned home from the JAG Corps he once again resumed his position as trial counsel with the Legal Defenders Association Felony and Homicide Division. Valdez spent 9 years working as a public defender and in 1993 he was appointed a Third District Juvenile Court Judge by then Governor Michael O. Leavitt.

== Early life ==
Valdez was born in Northern New Mexico to Victor Valdez and Jeanie Sanchez. Valdez and his 3 siblings migrated to Utah in 1954 where his parents were determined to find financially stable work. As a boy Valdez worked as a shoe-shiner and eventually began selling papers when he was eight years old on the corner of Main Street and 200 South in Salt Lake City, Utah. As a boy Valdez knew he wanted to be a lawyer, while selling papers he was always impressed by lawyer's demeanor and their dress attire. When Andrew Valdez was 10 years old he met a man named Jack Keller who subsequently changed Valdez and his life's direction. Keller brought a whole new world to Andrew's eyes taking him to the Law School at the University of Utah, liberty park and introducing Valdez to tennis which became ultimately part of his lifelong goal and passion.

Valdez attended West High School in Salt Lake City, Utah where he continued to play tennis and graduated with his diploma in 1970. Directly after attending West High, Valdez enrolled in the University of Utah majoring in Political Science and Philosophy. Valdez walked on to the tennis team and competed, however, he put more effort into being a part of student politics at school by involving himself with the war movement, U of U assembly, Chicano student assembly and being a member of the Hinckley Institute of Politics.

== Legal career ==
After graduating law school, Valdez began his professional career as a public defender with the Legal Defenders Association Felony and Homicide Division. He spent two years working in Utah before he joined JAG Corps and worked as a lawyer in the military for three and a half years. During his time in the JAG Corps Valdez was on the military tennis team and competed against other players within Central Europe. After serving time in the JAG Corps Valdez returned home to Utah and resumed working as a public defender.

In 1993 after spending 9 years working in felony and homicide cases, Valdez was appointed to Utah Third District Juvenile Court. Valdez was the first Hispanic and first public defender to be appointed to the Utah district court. Since being appointed Valdez has served as chair of the statewide Youth Parole Authority, and on the Utah Sentencing Commission, the Board of Trustees for Primary Children’s Medical Center, the Juvenile Justice Task Force, the Board of Juvenile Court Judges, the Judicial Council, and is currently a member of the National Youth Gang Center.

Valdez was certified by the Utah Judicial Council as qualified to stand for judicial retention election in 2008 and was subsequently re-elected.

Judge Valdez has also developed a tennis based mentoring program that goes on at Liberty Park in Salt Lake City, Utah where troubled youth take part in learning the game of tennis. In this program Valdez has hopes of helping kids stay off of the streets and out of gangs by introducing the sport of tennis.

== Awards ==
Judge Valdez was honored in 2003 with the Martin Luther King Civil Rights Award by the NAACP. In 2005, the Footprinter’s Association Law Enforcement Office of the Year Award, the Utah Children Advocate of the Year Award and the Utah State Bar Judge of the Year Award. Valdez was also awarded the Caesar Chavez Peace and Justice Award and the Pete Suazo Community Service Award.

== Personal life ==
Valdez is married to Joyce P. Valdez who is a part of the Board of Trustees at the University of Utah and together they have four kids.

Valdez has written a book named No One Makes it Alone, which is an autobiography of him and his relationship with his mentor Jack Keller and how Keller gave Valdez a job and the ambition to become a lawyer and ultimately a judge.

== See also ==
- List of Hispanic and Latino American jurists
- List of first minority male lawyers and judges in Utah
