= Timothy Ruggles (Nova Scotia politician) =

Canadian politician

- Born: March 7, 1776; Granville Centre, Nova Scotia
- Died: 21 February 1831 (aged 54)
- Relatives: Timothy Ruggles, grandfather

Timothy Ruggles (March 7, 1776 – February 21, 1831) was a merchant, farmer and political figure in Nova Scotia. He represented Granville township in the Nova Scotia House of Assembly from 1818 to 1831.

He was born in Granville, Nova Scotia, the son of Timothy Ruggles and the grandson of the loyalist general Timothy Ruggles (who died in Nova Scotia). He married Jane, the daughter of Edward Thorne. Ruggles was a partner in business with his nephew Stephen S. Thorne, who later also represented Granville in the provincial assembly.
