= Philip Armes =

English organist (1836–1908)

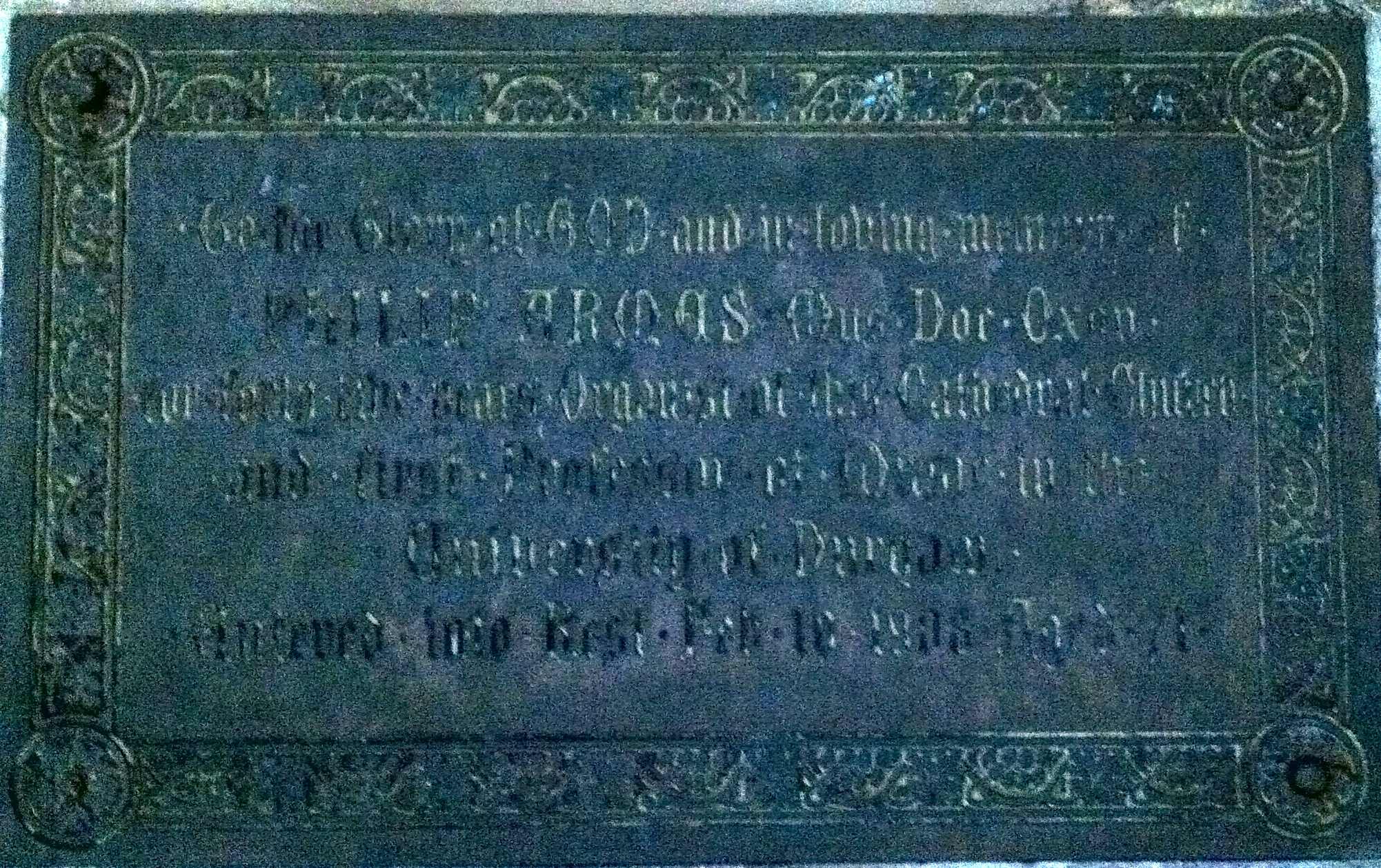
Memorial to Philip Armes in the cloister at Durham Cathedral

Philip Armes (15 August 1836 – 10 February 1908) was an English organist, notably holding posts at Rochester, Chichester and Durham Cathedral.

== Musical career ==
Armes was a chorister at the cathedral of his native city, Norwich, between 1846 and 1848, under Zechariah Buck. He then became a chorister at Rochester Cathedral where his father sang bass in the choir, from 1848 to 1850. He was an articled pupil of John Larkin Hopkins, organist of Rochester Cathedral.

He transitioned from a chorister to assistant organist at Rochester in 1850. In 1854 he became organist of Trinity Church, Milton, Kent, where he worked until 1857. He spent four years as organist of St Andrew's Church, Wells Street, London, before he became organist and master of the choristers at Chichester Cathedral in 1861. Following the collapse of the cathedral's central tower and spire, Armes moved to the more lucrative organist position at Durham Cathedral, in 1862, a post he held for 45 years.

Armes taught in the music department at Durham University, was resident examiner from 1890 and became professor of music there in 1897.

He had married, in 1864, Emily Jane, the daughter of Sir Henry Davison, chief justice of the Madras High Court; they had two sons, Augustus and Algernon, and two daughters, Emily and Alice.

Armes died on 10 February 1908 in North Bailey, Durham, and is buried in Bow Cemetery, Durham.

=== Academic qualifications ===
- Bachelor of Music (Oxon, 1858)
- Master of Arts (Dunelm)
- Doctor of Music (Oxon, 1864)
- Doctor of Music (Dunelm, 1874)
- Fellow of the Royal College of Organists
- Honorary Royal Academy of Music

== Works ==
Armes wrote oratorios, church music, madrigals, psalm chants and organ pieces. In 1901 he delivered a lecture at Manchester on Double Counterpoint, Imitation, and Canon.

=== Anthems ===
- Give ear, O ye heavens
- I will sing a new song
- O send out thy light
- Rejoice in the Lord, O ye righteous
- The Lord preserveth the souls of his saints
- We wait for thy loving-kindness

=== Hymn tunes ===
Two hymn tunes, Galilee (LM) and St. Bede (8.7.8.7.8.7) appear in Hymns Ancient and Modern. Other hymn tunes he wrote include Armes (SM) and Obedience (7.7.7.7), as well as other unnamed tunes.

=== Madrigal/ part-song ===
- Angels' Music

=== Oratorios ===
- Hezekiah (1878)
- St. John the Evangelist (1881)
- St. Barnabas (1891, Durham Cathedral)

=== Organ ===
- Introduction and Fugue
- Pastorale

=== Services ===
- Communion Service in A
- Communion Service in B-flat (Unison)
- Preces, Responses, Litany and latter Suffrages

== See also ==
- Organs and organists of Chichester Cathedral
- Durham University Department of Music

Cultural offices
Preceded by Henry R. Bennett	Organist and master of the choristers of Chichester Cathedral; 1861–1863	Succeeded by Edward Thorne
Preceded by William Henshaw	Organist and master of the choristers of Durham Cathedral; 1862–1907	Succeeded by Arnold D. Culley
