= George Thorn (disambiguation) =

George Thorn (1838–1905), son of George Thorn (senior), was Premier of Queensland, Australia.

George Thorn may also refer to:

- George Thorn (senior) (1806-1876), politician in Queensland, Australia; father of George Thorn
- George W. Thorn (1906–2004), American physician
- George Thorn (songwriter), see Spanish Harlem (album)

== See also ==
- George Thorne (disambiguation)
- Georges Thorn, see List of presidents of the Council of State of Luxembourg
