= Daniel Thorner =

American economist

Daniel Thorner (1915–1974) was an American-born economist known for his work on agricultural economics and Indian economic history. He is known for the application of historical and contemporary economic analysis on policy and influenced agricultural policy in India in the 1950s through his association with the Planning Commission. Along with D. D. Kosambi and R. S. Sharma, he brought peasants into the study of Indian history for the first time.

== Early life ==
He started his graduate studies at Columbia University in the 1930s, and served in the Office of Strategic Services before moving to India at the end of World War II. He completed his thesis on the conditions of the British railway and steam ship enterprise in India in 1950, later published as a book. He subsequently joined the University of Pennsylvania South Asia Regional Studies Program to teach Indian economic history. He married Alice Thorner, who was a collaborator and co-author of many of his works on India.

== Return to India ==
During the 1950s, under Senator Joseph McCarthy, there was a witchhunt for leftist economists, and Thorner would not divulge the names of his leftist friends. Thus he lost his job and a government-funded fellowship for a project in India. He borrowed money from his parents and left for Bombay in 1952 along with his wife He travelled extensively in Indian villages and continued to work on agricultural economics.

== Academic work ==
His stay in India resulted in three books on Indian agriculture. The first one, The Agrarian Prospect in India published in 1956, was based on his direct observations and interactions with villagers in several parts of India. His two subsequent books were published after he left India and were Agricultural cooperatives in India, a collection of papers on agriculture and economic history and Land and Labour in India. Both were analytical works, examining the impact of policy on Indian farmers and boldly questioned existing statistics, reports and data, where they were poor or unreliable. In Bombay, he built a large circle of friends and admirers and contributed to the Economic and Political Weekly. He also lectured at the Delhi School of Economics. His interactions with PC Mahalanobis resulted in his contributions to the Planning Commission to refine the tabulations of the 1961 census. The previous tabulations for the 1881 and 1911 Indian census developed by Colin Clark showed a significant decline in the share of Indian workforce in various industrial sectors implying drastic deindustrialization. Thorner reexamined the census data and convincingly argued that the tabulations used by Clark were misleading. He concluded from the data that de-industrialization in India was very modest in the twentieth century, and any de-industrialization had occurred in the late nineteenth century, contrary to prevailing belief.

== Later life ==
Due to desire to return to a university and partially due to economic reasons, he left India in 1962 after spending ten years, to take up an academic position at School for Advanced Studies in the Social Sciences. He edited the works of Harold H. Mann, an economist, and Alexander Chayanov. He was instrumental in introducing Chayanov's work to the English-speaking scholars. He continued to visit South Asia often and helped with the escape from persecution of some intellectuals from Dhaka during the Bangladesh Liberation War After a brief period of illness, he died in 1974.
