= Alice Thorner =

American-born social scientist and statistician

- Born: 1917; Latvia
- Died: 24 August 2005 (aged 89–90); Paris, France
- Scientific career
- Fields: Social science

Alice Thorner (1917 – 24 August 2005) was a Latvian-born social scientist and statistician whose main research effort was partly devoted to the role assigned to women in the Indian society.

== Early years ==
Alice Ginsburg was born in present-day Latvia in 1917. Her family emigrated to the US, and she earned a B.A. in economics from the University of Chicago in 1937. For her graduate studies she entered Columbia University, where she met her future husband and co-worker Daniel Thorner, before graduating with an M.A. in social psychology in 1941. A member of her family may have turned her maiden name into Gaines due to the rise of American antisemitism in the thirties.

== Move to England ==
A stay in London, partly funded by a doctoral fellowship of her husband, may have been the begin of several long-lasting friendships with Indian social scientists, like P N Haksar and Trivedi who would later greet her on a yearly basis in the country she enjoyed studying and played a key role in a shift towards a more left-wing view of society.

== Stay in India ==
A so-called witchhunt against some scientists that did not entirely reject some ideas described in part of the writings due to a soviet agrarian economist named Alexander V. Chayanov associated to a husband refusal to testify against some friends they met in London lead to several grant losses and was associated to an American passport withdrawal and significantly darkened university career prospects for both. A long stay in India that had been planned before begun in spite of these difficulties. Thorner significantly contributed to updating a method of accounting for various categories of working women in later census as a consultant for the Indian government. A book entitled Land and Labour in India was later co-authored with her husband as a summary of a relatively fruitful study of an India society.

== Settlement in France ==
Charles Bettelheim played a role in presenting the Thorners to the director of studies Louis Dumont at the Sorbonne-based École pratique des hautes études. A development of what would later become an Indian social science department in School for Advanced Studies in the Social Sciences lead to an invitation by Fernand Braudel. An absence of a PhD degree lead to some difficulties at becoming a lecturer, when the Thorners decided to live in France.

== Later life ==
A one-year period of illness due to cancer led Daniel Thorner into starting a 1974 world tour alone and his later death seems to have deeply affected Alice. School for Advanced Studies in the Social Sciences was the place where she attempted to keep teaching for close to twenty years and the invited professors of which she attempted to stay in contact through numerous invitations at her Parisian home. A significant fraction of the writings of her husbands was published after his death due to her editing efforts. She made a point at returning to India every year and tried to strengthen the links between Indian and French social scientists by sometimes organizing symposia or keeping in touch with a few other social scientists in France and abroad such as Marc Gaborieau, Jacques Pouchepadass, Sujata Patel and John DeFrancis.

== Family ==
Alice and Daniel Thorner had two sons and two daughters who produced a total of five grandchildren.

== Death ==
She died at the American Hospital of Paris in 2005. She was cremated and her ashes were buried next to her husband Daniel in Père Lachaise Cemetery.
