= George Thorne =

George Thorne may refer to:

- George Thorne (fl. 1636–1662), mayor of Reading
- George Thorne (actor) (1856–1922), English singer and actor
- George Thorne (golfer), British golfer who competed in the 1900 Summer Olympics
- George Thorne (footballer) (born 1993), English footballer
- George Thorne (politician) (1853–1934), British solicitor and politician

== See also ==
- George Thorn (disambiguation)
