= Tuomas Eerola =

Tuomas Eerola is professor in music cognition at Durham University. He studied at the University of Jyväskylä from where he received his MA in music in 1997, and his PhD in musicology in 2003. His research focuses on music and emotion and music perception in general. He has over 200 publications that can be accessed from Google Scholar. He has been awarded major research grants from Academy of Finland to study the appeal of sad music, from Economic and Social Research Council to explore the tagging of emotions in music, and Arts and Humanities Research Council (as a co-PI) to study the interpersonal entrainment in music performance. He has also contributed to Australian Research Council Discovery Project grants. At Music Department at Durham University, he has served as the Director of Research (2013-2015, 2021-2024) and the Head of Department (2018-2020).
