= John Thorne =

John Thorne may refer to:

- John Thorne (American football) (born 1957), American football coach
- John Thorne (civil servant) (1888–1964), civil servant in the Indian Civil Service
- John Thorne (MP) in 1388, MP for Guildford
- John Thorne (writer), American culinary writer
- John Thorne (racing driver) (born 1969), British auto racing driver
- John Thorne (rugby union), English international rugby union player

== See also ==
- Jack Thorne (disambiguation)
- Jon Thorne (born 1967), English double bassist, producer and composer
- John Thorn (disambiguation)
