= Jack Thorne (disambiguation) =

Jack Thorne may refer to:

- Jack Thorne, British writer and playwright
- Jack "Doc" Thorne, character in the novel Jurassic Park
- Jack Thorne (mathematician), British mathematician

== See also ==
- John Thorne (disambiguation)
