= Thomas Sprott (chronicler) =

English Benedictine chronicler

Thomas Sprott or Spott (fl. 1292) was an English Benedictine chronicler, a monk of St Augustine's Abbey, Canterbury.

== Chronicles ==
Sprott wrote a history of St Augustine's Abbey. His work was used and acknowledged by the chroniclers Thomas Elmham and William Thorne. Thorne copies him freely to 1228, where he says Sprott's share ends. He elsewhere stated that Sprott's work ended in 1272, a point that is unclear in surviving manuscripts (which had later additions, and some damage). John Leland mentioned a chronicle by Sprott that extended to 1272, which Casimir Oudin stated was among the manuscripts of Walter Cope.

== Manuscripts and misattributions ==
The text of Sprott's chronicle survives in two variant 13th-century manuscripts (Lambeth Palace Library MS 419, folios 111–60; and British Library Cotton MS Tiberius A.ix, folios 107–80), and in several later transcripts. However, it has never been printed.

Two texts falsely attributed to Sprott have been published:

- A roll, with no title, in the possession of Joseph Mayer, was printed in facsimile and ascribed to Sprott. It contained brief chronicles from the beginning of the world to 1307. This work dates from the 15th century, and is no longer considered to be by Sprott. It consists almost entirely of abstracts from the Flores Historiarum formerly ascribed to "Matthew of Westminster". A translation of the roll, with the title Sprott's Chronicle of Sacred and Profane History, was issued by William Bell (Liverpool, 1851).
- A chronicle of general history from the creation to 1339 was printed by Thomas Hearne in 1719 as Sprott's; with a number of Fragmenta Sprottiana, from a manuscript of Sir Edward Dering. The chronicle is of the late 14th century, and attribution to Sprott is no longer supported.

== Notes ==
Attribution

This article incorporates text from a publication now in the public domain: Lee, Sidney, ed. (1898). "Sprott, Thomas". Dictionary of National Biography. Vol. 53. London: Smith, Elder & Co.
