= Frank Thorn =

Frank Thorn or Thorne may refer to:

- Frank Thorn (cricketer) (1912–1942), Australian cricketer.
- Frank Manly Thorn (1836–1907), American lawyer, journalist, and government official
- Frank Thorne (1930–2021), American comic book artist-writer
- Frank Thorne (bishop) (1892–1981), Anglican colonial bishop in Africa

== See also ==
- Frankie Thorn (born 1964), American actress
- Francis Thorne (1922–2017), American composer of contemporary classical music
