= John Thorn =

John Thorn may refer to:

- John Thorn (baseball historian) (born 1947), American writer and baseball historian
- John Thorn (politician) (1847–1896), Australian politician in Queensland
- John Thorn (headmaster) (1925–2023), English schoolmaster and writer

== See also ==
- John Thorne (disambiguation)
