= James Thorne =

James Thorne may refer to:

- James E. Thorne, American politician
- James Thorne (preacher) (1795–1872), English Methodist preacher and editor
- James Thorne (footballer) (born 1996), English professional footballer
- James Thorne (antiquary), English antiquary
