= Andy Thorn =

Andy Thorn may refer to:

- Andy Thorn (American football) (born 1982), American football player
- Andy Thorn (footballer) (born 1966), English footballer
