= Southwestern New Mexico =

U.S. region

Southwestern New Mexico is a region of the U.S. state of New Mexico commonly defined by Hidalgo County, Grant County, Catron County, Luna County, Doña Ana County, Sierra County, and Socorro County. Some important towns there are Lordsburg, Silver City, Deming, Las Cruces, Truth or Consequences, Socorro, Reserve, and Rodeo.

Natural attractions there include White Sands National Park, the Organ Mountains, Bosque del Apache National Wildlife Refuge, and the Gila Wilderness surrounding the Gila Cliff Dwellings National Monument. Southwestern New Mexico is also home to both the Very Large Array and White Sands Missile Range containing the Trinity Site.

== History and economy ==
The geology of southwestern New Mexico has been studied extensively.

Pre-contact distribution of Uto-Aztecan languages

The Clovis people were some of the first people who lived in this area. Uto-Aztecan peoples, such as the Comanches, possibly passed through, although they were not known to have settled in southwestern New Mexico.

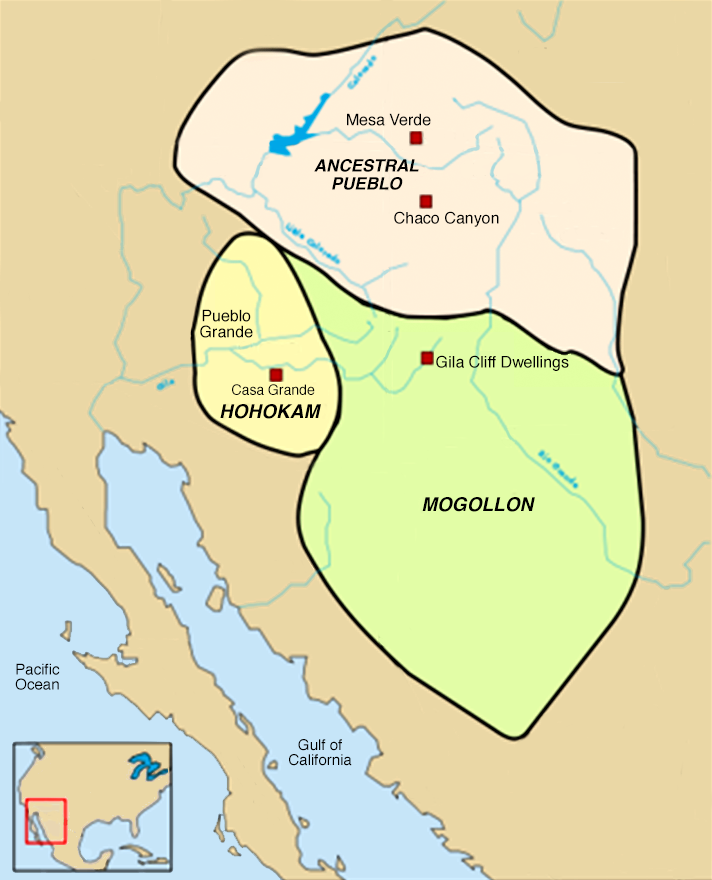
Map of major prehistoric Oasisamerica archaeological cultures

The Hohokam probably arrived next from the west, followed lastly by speakers of Athabaskan languages, such as the Navajos and Apache. The Mogollon people were scattered broadly across what is now southwestern New Mexico. The Gila Cliff Dwellings were probably built by their ancestors.

The Mimbres people lived in communities, what are today called the Mattocks site and the Swarts ruin.

The O'odham people of the Gila River valley, whose drainage system starts in New Mexico, have reclaimed their precious legal water resources.

Note that neither the Pueblo nor the Hopi ever lived permanently in southwestern New Mexico; they have lived for centuries in northern New Mexico and Arizona, respectively.

Spanish missionaries and explorers started to arrive in 1540, and by the mid-1600s, co-created with the indigenous population a style of agriculture called a Hispanicized or rancheria farming. The colonial period drastically changed the lifestyle of the indigenous peoples of New Mexico.

Mining was an important part of the economic development of southwestern New Mexico, starting in 1804 at Santa Rita during the Nuevo Mexico period of Spanish colonization. Gold was discovered in 1860 at Pinos Altos and in Hillsboro in 1877. Silver City came later.

The Gadsden Purchase of 1853 facilitated the construction of a railway from New Orleans to California through Arizona and southwestern New Mexico.

== Transportation ==
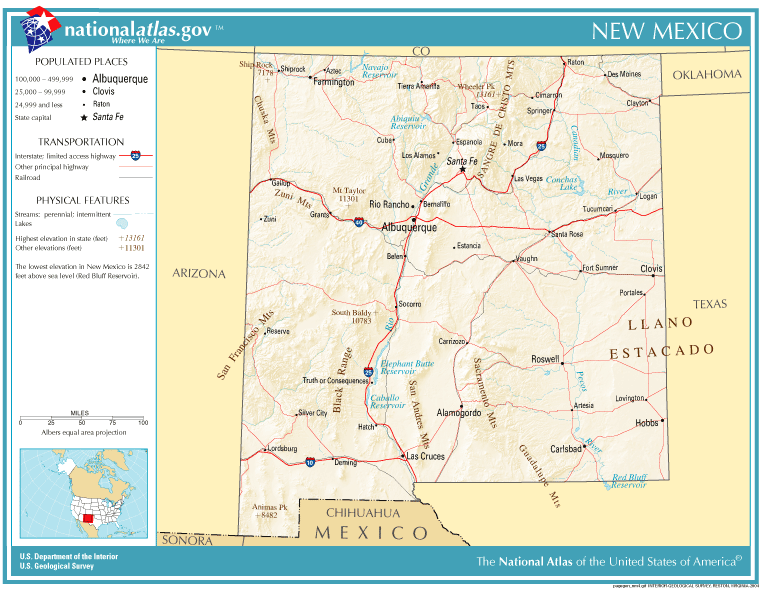

Personal automobiles and trucks remain the primary means of transportation in southwestern New Mexicans. There are two Interstate Highways that cross over or traverse nearby: 10 and 25.

As of 2024, there are no passenger train services in the area. There were bus services, but the schedules and services change frequently.

== Major sights ==
There are many man-made and natural sights for tourists. Tourism is a major part of the economy in southwestern New Mexico, albeit not as much as the northern part of the state.

Truth or Consequences was started as a hot springs resort, and renamed itself after a popular television show.

Silver City is known for its Old West attractions and blues music festival.

The Very Large Array, made famous by Contact, is a popular film buff destination.

Natural attractions there include White Sands National Park, the Organ Mountains, Bosque del Apache National Wildlife Refuge, and the Gila Wilderness surrounding the Gila Cliff Dwellings National Monument.
