= Edward Thorne (musician) =

Edward Henry Thorne, F.R.C.O. (1834–1916) was born in Dorset in 1834. He learned music under George Elvey at Chapel Royal. He became Organist of Henley Parish Church at the age of 19. He was working at Chichester Cathedral when the Cathedral reopened with a rebuilt spire and crossing; his anthem, 'I Was Glad', was composed for the special service that marked that occasion. In 1870, he moved to St Patrick's Church, Hove, and he was later at several London churches, notably St Anne's Church, Soho, where he carried on the revival of Bach's music instigated by Joseph Barnby. He was also a composer. An overture of his was performed at an 1885 Promenade Concert, and a number of his hymn tunes were included in Hymns Ancient and Modern. He died in 1916.

Cultural offices
Preceded by Philip Armes	Organist and Master of the Choristers of Chichester Cathedral; 1863-1870	Succeeded by Francis Edward Gladstone
