= Peter Thorne (reporter) =

American television anchor and reporter

Peter Thorne is an American television anchor and reporter.

== Career ==
Peter Thorne began his television career as a reporter and weekend anchor at CBS affiliate WBOC-TV in Salisbury, Maryland. From there, he went on to work as a noon and 5 p.m. anchor at ABC affiliate WHBQ-TV in Memphis (now a Fox affiliate); followed by a return to New York City when he was recruited to help launch a new network - Court TV, where he served as a national correspondent covering a wide range of stories including the high-profile trial of the Menéndez brothers and the parole hearing of Charles Manson inside the maximum security Corcoran State Prison.

Thorne later joined KCOP in Los Angeles, where he served as a general assignment reporter. His primary beat was breaking news. In addition to his regular duties while at KCOP, Thorne also wrote, produced and reported a multi-part news series called "Scared Straight: California". Thorne and his team spent several days inside San Quentin State Prison with criminals as they confronted a group of at-risk teenagers hoping to deter them from a life of crime.

Thorne joined New York City's WPIX in September 2001 as a reporter for the station's weekday morning newscast. Thorne started at the station during the week of September 11, 2001, and his first assignment found him reporting on the terrorist attack on the World Trade Center. He was promoted to weekend anchor in April 2002, and continued to complement his anchor responsibilities as a reporter. Thorne also served as a correspondent and substitute anchor for Jim Watkins on the station's weeknight newscasts.

In addition, Peter and colleague Mary Murphy were part of WPIX's "Fact Finders" investigative unit. As investigative correspondents, Thorne and Murphy examined various topics from national security issues to community issues. In 2006, Peter was nominated for an Emmy award for a Fact Finders report, which explored the dilapidated conditions at many subway stations citywide.

As part of the investigative unit, Thorne has also reported on prescription anti-biotics being sold illegally at Manhattan bodegas, the disturbing discovery of "toxic backyards" containing Benzene and other hazardous chemicals in a Staten Island neighborhood, Iraq war veterans facing homelessness as they struggled to re-adjust to life in New York City, senior citizens battling drug addiction in their golden years, the trail of blood diamonds from African mines to the streets of New York, and cutting-edge research in the hunt for a bird flu vaccine.

== Awards ==
Thorne has received many journalism awards for his reporting including: an Emmy Award from the National Academy of Television Arts and Sciences (NATAS) for Best Single Hard News Story: "Death of a Dream" (2005), and multiple Emmy nominations including Best Single Hard News Story: "Jailhouse Jihad" (2005) and "New York City's Worst Subways" (2006); and for coverage of the second deadliest aviation accident in American history - "The Crash of Flight #587" (2002) that crashed after take-off from JFK just two months after 9/11.

The Associated Press – on both coasts – has awarded Thorne the organization's top honors for his coverage of breaking news – in New York that includes Best Spot News coverage "Police Detective Killed" (2004) and in LA the "Bill Stout Memorial Award" for Best Spot News Coverage "Lakers Riot" (2000). He was also awarded the Golden Mic Award for Best Breaking News Coverage "Lakers Riot" (2000). The Associated Press also awarded Thorne for his coverage of "The First Anniversary of September 11th" (2002); and he was honored with a Best of the West Award for "Development Reporting: Slab City" (1999).

Emmy Awards

- 2005: Best Single Hard News Story: "Death of a Dream"

Associated Press Awards

- 2004: Best Spot News coverage: "Police Detective Killed"
- 2002: Best News: "The First Anniversary of September 11th"
- 2000: Bill Stout Memorial Award for Best Spot News Coverage: "Lakers Riot" (KCOP)

Golden Mic Award

- 2000: Best Breaking News Coverage: "Lakers Riot" (KCOP)

Best of the West Award

- 1999: Best of the West Award: "Development Reporting: Slab City" (KCOP)
