= Peter Thorne (RAF officer) =

- Born: 3 June 1923; Eastbourne, England
- Died: 5 April 2014 (aged 90)
- Military career
- Allegiance: United Kingdom
- Branch: Royal Air Force
- Service years: 1941–1978
- Rank: Air Commodore
- Commands: RAF Farnborough
- Conflicts: Second World War
- Awards: Officer of the Order of the British Empire; Air Force Cross & Two Bars
- Other work: Aviation consultant

Air Commodore Peter Donald Thorne, OBE, AFC & Two Bars (3 June 1923 – 5 April 2014) was a fighter pilot and test pilot in the Royal Air Force (RAF), who held diplomatic posts in Tehran and Moscow during the 1970s.

== Early years ==
Thorne was born on 3 June 1923 in Eastbourne, East Sussex, to Donald and Olive (née Dyson). He was educated at Culford School in Bury St Edmunds.

== Service ==
In April 1941, Thorne enlisted in the Royal Air Force (RAF) for service in the Second World War, and began flight training while still only 17 years old. He undertook a short course at the University of Edinburgh and training in Canada, then flew Hawker Typhoons in No. 193 Squadron RAF (1942–43). He was promoted to flying officer in 1943, with seniority from 3 January. He flew Mustangs in No. 170 Squadron RAF before leading a training unit in Peterborough.

Thorne re-enlisted after the war, and by 1947 he was a flight commander at RAF Leconfield. He was awarded the Air Force Cross in 1947, with Bars in 1951 and 1956. He helped to train Middle East fighter squadrons in Nicosia, Cyprus from 1948 to 1951. He attended the Empire Test Pilots' School in 1951, then was stationed at RAF Boscombe Down. He was senior test pilot on the Supermarine Swift programme.

In 1955, Thorne was the first RAF airman fly the English Electric P.1A. He flew supersonic in an F-100 Super Sabre at Edwards Air Force Base, California. From 1958 to 1960 he was stationed at RAF Sylt, West Germany, where he oversaw three nations' fighter squadrons. He was appointed an Officer of the Order of the British Empire in 1960 as a wing commander. At RAF Farnborough from 1965 to 1968 he was in charge of experimental flying.

In the early 1970s Thorne was air attache to Iran. He was defence attache in Moscow during the Brezhnev era and retired as an air commodore.

== Later life ==
Until 1998 Thorne consulted for Huntings Engineering and Lockheed Martin. He later volunteered for the Duxford Aviation Society and the Imperial War Museum.

== Personal life ==
Thorne's first marriage was to Sheila Fox. They had one daughter and subsequently three grandchildren. In 1951 Thorne then married Mary, a Women's Auxiliary Air Force radio operator. Mary died in 2013. They had four children and seven grandchildren.
