= William Thorne (mayor of Brisbane) =

William Thorne was a printer, newspaper owner and politician in Brisbane, Queensland, Australia. He was Mayor of Brisbane in 1898.

== Personal life ==
Thorne was a prominent member of the Wharf Street Congregational Church.

== Later life ==
Thorne died on 11 October 1915 at the Central Mission Hall, Adelaide, South Australia. He was visiting Adelaide to attend the centenary of the Bible Christian Society, being the grandson of the society's founder. He was giving a speech when he suddenly said "Excuse me, friends" and then collapsed and died; his wife and brother-in-law Rev. O. Lake were present.
