= Peter Thorne (Australian footballer) =

Personal information
- Full name: Peter Thorne
- Born: 24 January 1960 (age 66)
- Original team: Melbourne U-19s
- Height: 175 cm (5 ft 9 in)
- Weight: 79 kg (174 lb)
- Position: Forward

Playing career^{1}
Years	Club	Games (Goals)
1978–79, 1984	Melbourne	26 (35)
- ^{1} Playing statistics correct to the end of 1984.

Peter Thorne (born 24 January 1960) is a former Australian rules footballer who played for Melbourne in the Victorian Football League (VFL).

Thorne did not make much of an impact in his first two league seasons but did kick a six-goal haul in a win over South Melbourne at the MCG. He spent 1980-81 with VFA club Prahran, and 1982-83 at East Perth before returning to Melbourne for the 1984 VFL season. Amongst his 17 goals for the year was a bag of seven against Footscray, with his teammate Kelvin Templeton contributing eight.

Back in Western Australia, Thorne played at Claremont and was a member of their 1987 premiership team. His performance in the WAFL Grand Final earned him the first of two Simpson Medals. The other came in a 1988 interstate match, against the Victorian Football Association.

Subiaco signed him on as their senior coach in 1997 and despite steering the club to the 1998 Preliminary Finals, he was replaced as coach in 1999.

Thorne became a biology teacher at Christ Church Grammar School in 1995, currently teaching for 24 years.
