= David Thorne (writer) =

Australian humourist, satirist and Internet personality

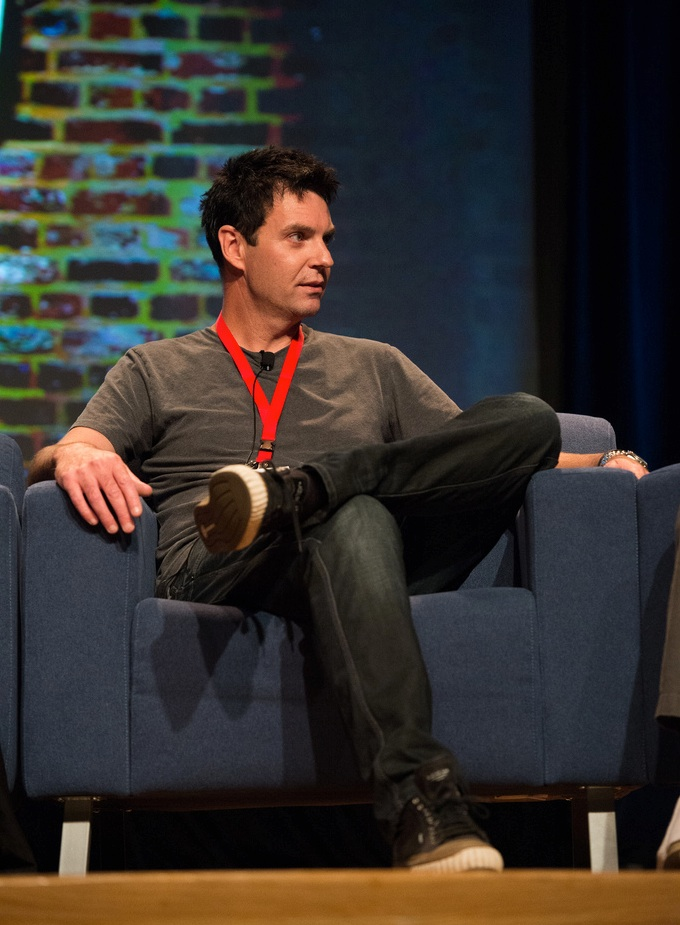
- Thorne in 2012
- Born: 23 February 1972 (age 54); Geraldton, Western Australia
- Occupations: Writer, design director
- Writing career
- Period: 2006–present
- Genre: Satire
- Website: www.27bslash6.com

David R. Thorne (born 23 February 1972) is an Australian humourist, satirist, and Internet personality. His work has been featured on the BBC, the Late Show with David Letterman, The Ellen DeGeneres Show, and Late Night with Conan O'Brien. Thorne gained public recognition in late 2008 for an email exchange in which he attempts to pay an overdue bill with a drawing of a seven-legged spider. The exchange spread virally via email and social networking sites, leading to a surge of visitors to his website 27b/6 (27bslash6). 27b/6 features a collection of humorous emails and articles from Thorne's life. These and additional essays appear in Thorne's book, The Internet is a Playground. Published by Penguin Group and released on 28 April 2011, the book debuted at number four on the New York Times Best Seller list.

Thorne says that he has been a long-time fan of satirists such as Ross Amorelli, Mil Millington, Chris Lilley, and Shaun Micallef, stating that they have all been a "constant source of amusement over the last few years". Much of Thorne's humour is biographical, often concerning his immediate family and work associates.

== 27bslash6 ==
The name of Thorne's website (27bslash6) is a reference to Form 27B/6, a plot device in Terry Gilliam's Brazil, itself a reference to George Orwell's address – Apartment 6, 27B Canonbury Square, Islington, London. The website went from receiving a hundred hits a week from a small and consistent group of people to gaining a larger mainstream audience – a few thousand hits a day – when the article I Wish I Had a Monkey was listed on the Bored at Work website. Following the spider drawing page being posted on Digg, the 27bslash6 server crashed after taking over half a million hits in a 24-hour period before being moved to a dedicated server. The second server crashed following Thorne's next article, "Party in Apartment 3", in which Thorne repeatedly confirms he will attend a party he has not been invited to, before the site was moved to a third server in the US and has since continued to receive a large volume of traffic.

The spider drawing itself became so popular that it was auctioned on eBay, where a user posted a high bid of US$10,000, but subsequently said he had no intention of paying. When asked how he felt about the refusal of the buyer to pay, Thorne stated, "The internet is a playground and I would not have it any other way." The spider email has also been featured on several television and radio programs, including BBC's Have I Got News for You in the UK and the Late Show with David Letterman in the United States. The news article regarding the spider email was voted most popular news story of 2008 in Australia, where it received five times the views of any other article for the year.

Thorne has also had international success with many of his other articles from the 27bslash6 website such as "Missing Missy", a series of correspondences between Thorne and a secretary who requires a missing poster designed for her lost cat, "Strata Agreement", and "Party in Apartment 3", which became so popular that it was read out during a prime time broadcast on BBC Radio in the United Kingdom and reprinted in more than 300 newspapers worldwide. Thorne's article regarding a former client contacting him for pro-bono work titled "Simon's Pie Charts" (November 2009) became such a viral hit due to being passed on by email and social networking sites that it has been described as one of the most passed on viral emails of all time and has been mentioned on Twitter by many celebrities, read out on radio throughout the UK, United States, and Germany, and featured on The Ellen DeGeneres Show, Australia's The 7pm Project and Late Night with Conan O'Brien.

== Early life and education ==
Thorne was born in Geraldton, Western Australia, and is of Welsh descent. He has one sibling; a sister. Thorne's family moved to Adelaide, South Australia in 1976 where he attended Modbury North Primary school and then Banksia Park International High School. From 1991 to 1994, he attended the University of South Australia – earning a bachelor's degree in visual communication (graphics).

== Personal life ==
Thorne works remotely for a Washington, D.C.–based branding agency and spends his spare time writing, playing tennis, riding ATVs, and working on his boat. He also enjoys traveling and is a competitive sporting clays shooter.

== Incidents ==
On 3 March 2010, the website was taken offline for several hours and any attempt to access it was directed to a page stating the account had been suspended. Thorne had published an article a few days earlier detailing an email exchange with an officer from South Australia's E-Crime unit regarding an earlier article in which Thorne wrote of purchasing drugs to sell at a profit. Following the correspondence with the officer, Thorne replaced the word drugs with cats in the original article to avoid the threat of having the website shut down.

A former colleague, Simon Edhouse, has claimed one of Thorne's email exchanges with him was fabricated. Another former colleague, Lucius Thaller, stated Thorne used his real name and photograph, leading him to feel suicidal. Thorne maintains, "The email articles are verbatim although I do fix spelling errors, as is my prerogative, and bad grammar prior to posting. I also sometimes change the person's name or remove their second name, unless they have overly annoyed me, and there have been occasions when I have had to add context or delete non-contexual content such as footers. The non-email based articles feature people I know and are exagerated [sic] but based on actual events."

=== Kate's Birthday Party ===
On 25 April 2010, David Thorne created a Facebook event titled "Kate's Birthday Party". The hoax event, a birthday party for an Adelaide woman named Kate, was supposedly accidentally left open to public security settings, allowing anyone to RSVP. Following several links being posted on the image board 4chan and Reddit, the event amassed more than 60,000 attendees. Several blogs picked up on the event as an example of security flaws within Facebook. Thorne created an "I Attended Kate's Party" T-shirt and began selling it on his online store, whilst numerous Facebook groups were spawned in reference to the event. The event, originally scheduled for Saturday, 1 May at 8:00 pm, was eventually taken down by Facebook.

=== Disputes with publishers ===
Thorne's first book, a collection of articles from the website titled The Internet is a Playground, sold almost 80,000 copies in its first month of release. The book was originally picked up and released by a small Australian publisher named Fontaine Press. Disputes between Thorne and Fontaine Press regarding delivery and non-payment of author royalties caused Thorne to end his relationship with them a few months later. In 2011, the rights to publish the book, along with approximately 160 pages of new content, were purchased by Penguin Group US. Released on 28 April 2011, Penguin renamed the book The Internet is a Playground, Irreverent Correspondences of an Evil Online Genius and the book debuted at number four on The New York Times Best Seller list the following week.

Thorne's second release, a collection of both unpublished articles and ones from the website titled I'll Go Home Then, It's Warm and Has Chairs, was published independently of Penguin and sold over double the copies of his first book in its first month of release. The cover of its first edition featured a drawing of a Penguin giving the finger, leading to Penguin Group claiming trademark infringement and demanding the cover be changed. The cover was changed to a penguin throwing a bunch of flowers, but this was only in publication for a very limited time. The cover changed for a second time to feature a cat dressed as an astronaut, holding a snowboard after a sarcastic negotiation with Penguin Group which was published on the 27bslash6 website.

== Publications ==
- The Internet is a Playground – A collection of articles and more from 27bslash6.com (2011) Published by Tarcher / Penguin Group.
- I'll Go Home Then, It's Warm and Has Chairs – A second collection of articles containing some new, previously unpublished material (2012)
- Look Evelyn, Duck Dynasty Wiper Blades. We Should Get Them – A collection of new essays (2014)
- That's Not How You Wash a Squirrel – A collection of new essays and emails (2015)
- Wrap It in a Bit of Cheese Like You're Tricking The Dog – The fifth collection of essays and emails (2016)
- Walk It Off, Princess (2017)
- Burning Bridges to Light the Way (2019)
- Sixteen Different Flavours of Hell (2020)
- Deadlines Don't Care if Janet Doesn't Like Her Photo (2021)
- Let's Eat Grandma's Pills (2022)
- How to Talk to Girls and Lizards (2023)
- Just Because It Happened To You Doesn't Make It Interesting (2024)
- Hannah's Forehead & Other Horror Stories (2025)

== Collections ==
- The Collected Works of 27b/6. Victorian Edition – Illustrated & abridged for polite society (2016)
- The Ducks in the Bathroom Are Not Mine – A decade of procastination 2007-2017 (2017)
- Crows, Papua New Guinea, and Boats – A new collection of irreverence (2018)
- I Won’t Be Coming Into Work Today Because You're All Dickheads – A Guide to Office Survival (2019)
- A Fine Line Between Oblivious and Inanity – 118 short snippets (2021)
- Everyone's Friendly and Nobody Gets Upset – The complete collection of email correspondences (2022)
- Yesterday's Words at Tomorrow's Prices (2024)
