= William Thorne (philatelist) =

American philatelist and businessman

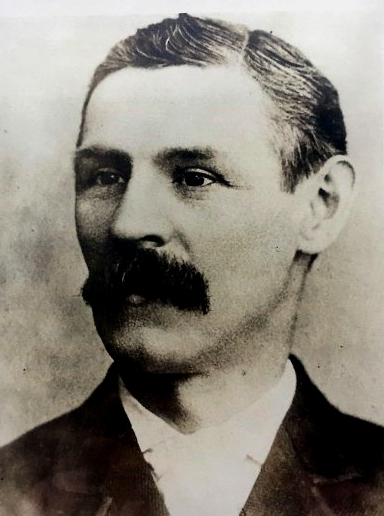
- Born: September 7, 1845; New York City
- Died: January 19, 1907 (aged 61)
- Occupations: Businessman and philatelist
- Known for: President of the Collectors Club of New York

William Thorne (September 7, 1845 – January 19, 1907) was a wealthy American businessman and philatelist. In poor health, he retired early from the leather trade and began to collect postage stamps. He was one of the founders of the Philatelic Society of New York and the second president of the Collectors Club of New York. He was the owner of the unique block of four of the 1869 24¢ United States stamps with inverted center. He sold his collection but restarted in order to provide a distraction from his poor health. He died in 1907 after three operations for what was thought to be throat cancer.

== Early life ==
William Thorne was born in New York City on September 7, 1845, to Jonathan Thorne (1801–1884), a Quaker, and his wife Lydia Ann Thorne née Corse. His father had started in the dry goods business before making a fortune in the leather industry, to which he was introduced by his father-in-law, and later in cattle importing.

== Career ==
Thorne was active in the family business but retired early, possibly due to ill health.

== Philately ==
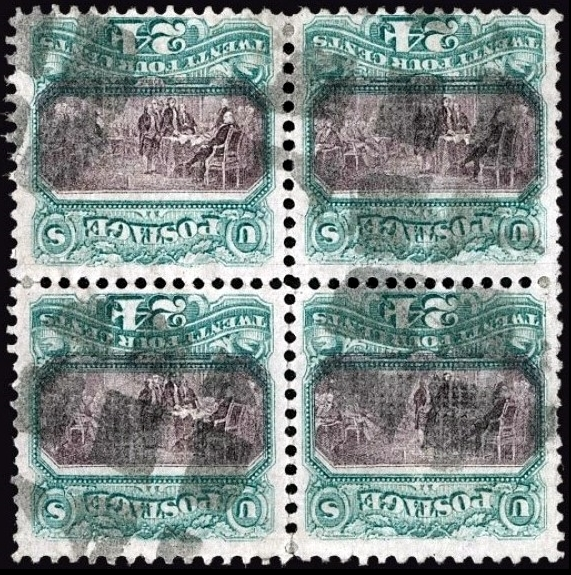
The block of four of the 1869 24¢ United States stamps with inverted center owned by Thorne (shown inverted).

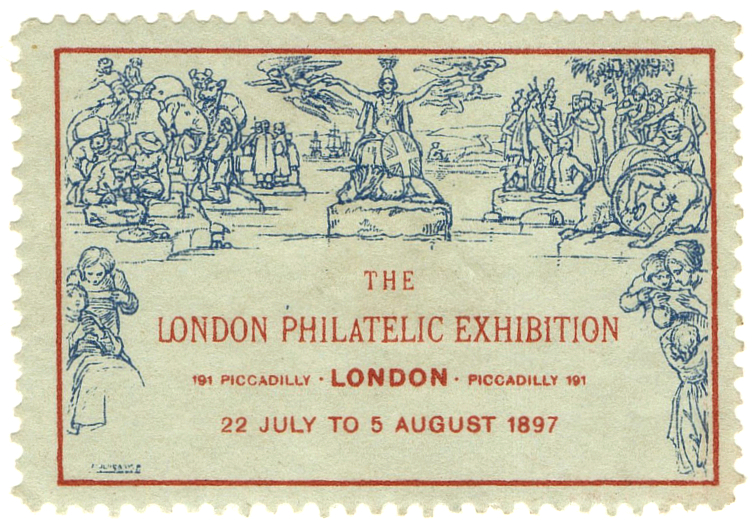
Souvenir label for the London Philatelic Exhibition 1897 at which Thorne won a gold medal.

Following his retirement, Thorne began to collect postage stamps, specializing at first in the stamps of the United States and the departmental stamps of Australia.

In 1888, he acquired the unique block of four 24¢ United States stamps of 1869 with inverted centers showing the signing of the United States Declaration of Independence. The block had been discovered in a Liverpool merchant's files around 1888 by someone known to local dealers only as the "Upside Down Man".

In March 1889 he exhibited his purchase at one of the world's first stamp exhibitions at the Eden Musée, New York. He also displayed the block, and the rest of the series also with inverted centers, at the London Philatelic Exhibition 1897, organized by the Philatelic Society, London (later the Royal Philatelic Society London), where he won a gold medal for his display titled "Rare Stamps". The block was later sold with the rest of Thorne's collection to the dealer A. W. Batchelder of the New England Stamp Company who sold it to William H. Crocker who owned it until his death. The idea that the block was originally of three vertically by two horizontally, with two separated by Thorne, has been dismissed as the only known invert pair does not match the surviving block of four.

In organized philately, Thorne was president of the New York Philatelic Society (founded January 23, 1891), joined the Royal Philatelic Society in 1892, and was the second president of the Collectors Club of New York (founded 1896).

Around 1899 he sold his collection, according to Alvin Harlow, because he was tired of the effort of chasing rarities. Soon feeling, however, that the lack of a hobby was contributing to the decline in his health, which was never good, he quickly restarted, collecting nothing but unused blocks of four of the stamps of the twentieth century. It was said by a friend that stamp collecting provided a distraction from his poor health and helped to keep him alive.

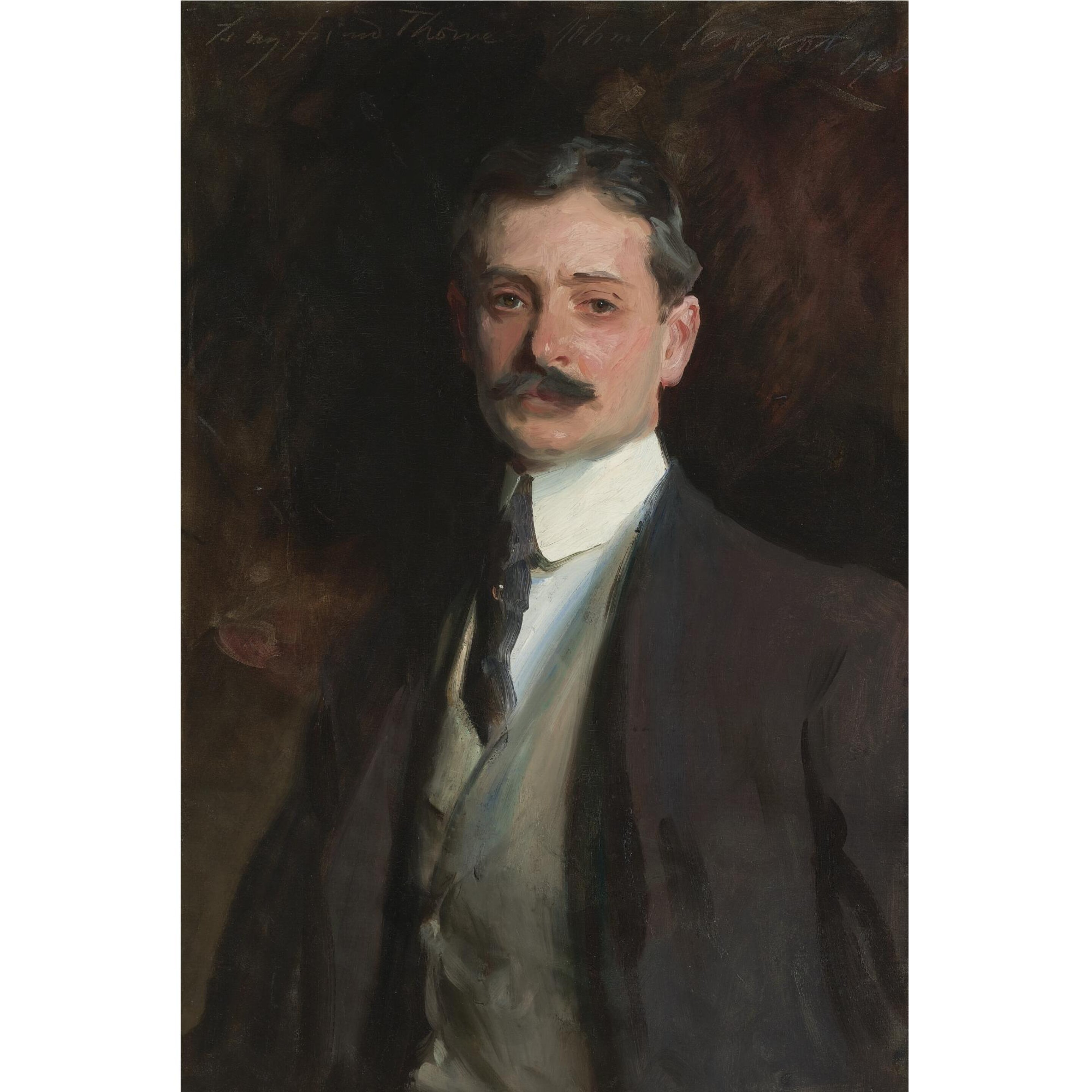
Painting of William Thorne by John Singer Sargent

== Death ==
Thorne died on January 19, 1907, "after a painful illness" and a third operation on his throat that Charles J. Phillips of Stanley Gibbons Monthly Journal thought was probably caused by cancer.

== See also ==
- Inverted Jenny
