= William A. Thorne Jr. =

American judge

William A. Thorne Jr. is a judge on the Utah Court of Appeals.

== Early life and education ==
Thorne was born and raised in Northern California. He graduated in 1974 with a BA in Philosophy and Social Sciences for the Practice of Law from The University of Santa Clara. He graduated in 1977 with a JD from Stanford. Thorne is a Pomo.

== Judicial career ==
William Thorne was appointed to the Third Circuit Court in Salt Lake City, Utah by Governor Norman Bangerter in 1986. He served as a circuit court judge until 1994 when Governor Michael Leavitt appointed him as a Third Judicial District Court Judge. Six years later, Governor Leavitt appointed him to The Utah State Court of Appeals where he has served ever since. Judge Thorne is the first Native American appointed to the Utah Bench.

== 2010 retention election ==
William Thorne was certified by the Utah Judicial Council as qualified for retention election in 2010. He was retained in office receiving a favorable 77.18% of the ballots cast.

== Selected opinions ==
=== State v. Ferretti ===
Robert Ferretti pleaded guilty to murder under a plea bargain. He later wanted to withdraw his plea. He was in the time limits of the plea bargain. However, the district court did not allow him to orally withdraw the plea, or give him and his attorney time to file a written motion for withdrawal. After being heard by the Appellate Court, the decision of the lower courts was overturned, and Ferretti and his counsel were given adequate time to file a written motion for withdrawal.

=== Kilgore v. West Jordan City, 2011 Ut. App 165 ===
Kilgore Pavement Maintenance was hired by West Jordan City for road reconstruction. When the bid was made, liquid asphalt oil was $350 per ton. However, shortly thereafter it raised to $1,005 per ton. Kilgore filed a request with the West Jordan City Council to raise the price of the project by $91,000. This was denied by West Jordan City Council and Kilgore filed suit alleging, among other things, that the city breached its contract. The trial court dismissed th suit and Kilgore appealed. The Court of Appeals, in an opinion authored by Judge Thorne, affirmed the court ruling, stating that Kilgore had to provide materials at his own expense, and he was not allowed to increase the price based on an increase in the price of materials.

=== LaChance v. Richman, 2011 UT App 40 ===
The Court of Appeals, in an opinion authored by Judge Thorne, affirmed the trial court's denial of mother's claim for retroactive child support prior to the filing of a paternity action. The mother had sought an award from the father for retroactive child support dating to the time of their separation which was a few months after the birth of the minor child. The mother presented evidence to the trial court of child support worksheets and verification of income earned by the parties during the time for which she sought support. At trial, the issue of estoppel or laches was raised and the trial court was presented evidence by mother's consul that the sums sought were for reimbursement rather than child support. The trial court ruled that the mother was seeking reimbursement rather than child support and since she could not demonstrate either an agreement or unmet needs on the part of the child the trial court denied her claim. On appeal, the Court of Appeals affirmed the trial court's ruling and refused to hear a new issue on appeal not raised in trial court. Additionally, the Court noted that the mother invited the error by agreeing she was seeking reimbursement rather than child support.

=== Withers v. Jepsen, 2011 UT App 8 ===
The Court of Appeals, in an opinion authored by Judge Thorne, affirmed the trial court's granting of summary judgement on a partition of jointly owned real property and denial of claims for "owelty." Two unmarried cohabitants jointly owned a home that was subject to a mortgage in both names. The woman sought to have the property sold and the man opposed. The trial court determined that because the home could not be equitably partitioned that it would be sold and the net proceeds divided equally. The man sought additional amounts for owelty which was dined by the trial court. The Court of Appeals affirmed the trial court's order that the property would be sold by recognizing that in a partition action one available remedy is the sale of the real property when physical division of the real property cannot be accomplished without great prejudice to the owners. The Court noted that the trial court determined that zoning restrictions would not allow actually partition and thus the oder for sale as appropriate.

== Community and professional service ==
Over the years, William Thorne has served on many community and professional boards and committees including:

- Former President of the National Indian Justice Center
- National Board of Directors of CASA (Court Appointed Special Advocates)
- Member of the Board of Directors of the Evan B. Donaldson Adoption Institute
- Member of the American Bar Association Steering Committee on the Unmet Legal Needs of Children
- Former member of the Utah Judicial Council
- Board of Circuit Court Judges
- Board of Directors for the National American Indian Court Judges Association
- Former chair of the Utah Juvenile Justice Task Force of the Commission on Criminal and Juvenile Justice
- Former Vice President of the Utah Board of Youth Corrections
- Former co-chair of the Judicial Council's committee on Improving Jury Service
- Former chair of the Judicial Council's Bail Bonding Committee
- Former member of the Utah State Court Technology Committee
- Former member of Salt Lake County Domestic Violence Advisory Committee
- Former member of the Commission on Racial and Ethnic Fairness and the Criminal and Juvenile Justice System

== See also ==
- List of Native American jurists
- List of first minority male lawyers and judges in Utah
