= David Thorne (rugby league) =

Australian rugby league footballer

Personal information
- Born: 30 June 1965 (age 60)

Playing information
- Position: Prop
Club
Years	Team	Pld	T	G	FG	P
1988–91	Newcastle Knights	36	1	0	0	4
- Source: As of 11 May 2010

David Thorne is an Australian former professional rugby league footballer who played in the 1980s and 1990s. He was part of the inaugural Newcastle Knights squad from 1988 to 1989 and then returned to play in 1991.
