= David Thorne (British Army officer) =

Major-General Sir David Thorne KBE CVO
- Born: 13 December 1933
- Died: 23 April 2000 (aged 66); Framlingham, Suffolk, England
- Military career
- Allegiance: United Kingdom
- Branch: British Army
- Service years: 1952–1988
- Rank: Major-General
- Service number: 433251
- Units: Royal Norfolk Regiment; Royal Anglian Regiment
- Commands: 1st Armoured Division; 3rd Infantry Brigade; 1st Battalion, Royal Anglian Regiment
- Conflicts: Operation Banner
- Awards: Knight Commander of the Order of the British Empire; Commander of the Royal Victorian Order

Major-General Sir David Calthrop Thorne, KBE, CVO (13 December 1933 – 23 April 2000) was a British Army officer who commanded the 1st Armoured Division from 1983 to 1985.

== Early life ==
Thorne was born on 13 December 1933. He was educated at St Edward's School, Oxford, and the Royal Military Academy Sandhurst, Thorne was commissioned into the Royal Norfolk Regiment in 1952. He was a keen cricketer and played two first-class matches for the Combined Services cricket team in 1964. He also played minor counties matches for Norfolk from 1954 to 1962, as did his twin brother, Michael (1955–1958), and uncle, Gordon Thorne (1914–1925).

== Military career ==
Thorne was given command of the 1st Battalion, Royal Anglian Regiment in 1972. He was appointed commander of the 3rd Infantry Brigade in Northern Ireland during Operation Banner in 1977, in which capacity in 1979 he was the first officer to brief Prime Minister Margaret Thatcher on the Warrenpoint ambush. He was appointed to the post of the British Army's Vice Quartermaster-General in 1981. In 1982, he was appointed as the Commander of British Forces in the Falkland Islands, shortly after their re-capture by the British Armed Forces from an Argentinian invasion in the Falklands War. In that role he gave support to the idea of then-Captain Geoffrey Cardozo to locate, retrieve, and respectfully bury every dead Argentine soldier left after the war ended.

Thorne went on to be General Officer Commanding (GOC) of the 1st Armoured Division in 1983 and Director of Infantry in 1986, in which role he secured the rejection of a proposed reform in the Ministry of Defence for the posting of officers which he believed would undermine the British Army's regimental system. He retired from the army in 1988.

In retirement Thorne became Director General of the Royal Commonwealth Society. He died from the effects of a cancer on 23 April 2000 at Framlingham, in the county of Suffolk, in his 67th year.

== Personal life ==
In 1962, Thorne married Suzan Anne Goldsmith; they had one son and two daughters.

Military offices
Preceded by Brian Kenny	GOC 1st Armoured Division; 1983–1985	Succeeded by Anthony Mullens
