= Christopher Thorne =

British historian

Christopher Guy Thorne
- Born: 17 May 1934
- Died: 20 April 1992 (aged 57)
- Known for: "Allies of a Kind: The United States, Britain and the War Against Japan, 1941–1945."
- Awards: Bancroft Prize
- Scientific career
- Fields: History
- Institutions: University of Sussex, Netherlands Institute for Advanced Study

Christopher Guy Thorne (17 May 1934 – 20 April 1992) was a British historian and a Professor of International Relations at the University of Sussex. He specialised in studying the Pacific War. He was a resident fellow at the Netherlands Institute for Advanced Study and a fellow of the British Academy. In 1986 he delivered the British Academy's Sarah Tryphena Phillips Lecture in American Literature and History. Thorne achieved some fame for his new approaches to international history, emphasising the importance of transnational research and perspectives.

He was the first non-American to win the Bancroft Prize for American history, awarded in 1979 for his book Allies of a Kind: The United States, Britain and the War Against Japan, 1941–1945.

He was educated at the Royal Grammar School, Guildford, and St. Edmund Hall, Oxford (B.A. 1958, M.A. 1962, D.Litt. 1980, Hon. Fellow 1989).

== Bibliography ==
- The Approach of War, 1938–1939, Humanity Press (1967) ISBN 0-333-03478-3
- The Limits of Foreign Policy: The West, The League, and the Far Eastern Crisis of 1931–1933, Palgrave Macmillan (1973) ISBN 0-333-15043-0
- Allies of a Kind: the United States, Britain, and the War against Japan, 1941–1945, Oxford University Press (1978) ISBN 0-19-520034-9
- The Issue of War: States, Societies, and the Far Eastern Conflict of 1941–1945, Oxford University Press (1985) ISBN 0-19-520474-3
- Border Crossings: Studies in International History, Blackwell (1988) ISBN 0-631-16062-0
- Between the Seas: A Quiet Walk through Crete, Sinclair-Stevenson (1994) ISBN 1-85619-188-5
