= David Thorne (cricketer) =

English cricketer (born 1964)

David Anthony Thorne (born 12 December 1964) is an English former cricketer active from 1983 to 1989 who played for Warwickshire, Oxford University and the combined Oxford and Cambridge Universities cricket team. He was born in Coventry. He went to Bablake School and Keble College, Oxford, where he obtained a 2:1 in modern history. He appeared in 69 first-class matches as a righthanded batsman who bowled left arm medium pace. He scored 2,523 runs with a highest score of 124 and held 54 catches. He took 41 wickets with a best performance of five for 39.

After retiring from professional cricket, Thorne worked in advertising and marketing.
