= Peter Thorne (climatologist) =

- Education: University of East Anglia
- Scientific career
- Fields: Climatology
- Workplaces: Maynooth University; NERSC; National Climatic Data Center; Hadley Centre for Climate Prediction and Research
- Thesis: Advancing climate change detection and attribution studies in the free atmosphere (2001)
- Website: Peter W. Thorne

Peter William Thorne is a climatologist and professor of physical geography in the Department of Geography, Maynooth University.

He graduated with a BSc in Environmental Sciences from the University of East Anglia in 1998, and a PhD from the School of Environmental Sciences in 2001. He previously worked at the Hadley Centre for Climate Prediction and Research and the National Climatic Data Center, and he was a senior scientist at the Nansen Environmental and Remote Sensing Center, Bergen, Norway. He is the chair of the International Surface Temperature Initiative which consists of an interdisciplinary effort to create a suite of improved Land Surface Air Temperature products to meet science needs and societal expectations in the era of climate services. Thorne is co-chair of the GCOS Working Group on the Global Climate Observing System Reference Upper Air Network (GRUAN), and he is also the project lead on the Horizon 2020 GAIA-CLIM project which aims to use such measurements to better characterise satellite measurements. He is one of the 831 Lead Authors of the IPCC Fifth Assessment Report.
