= Edward Thorne (politician) =

Canadian politician

Edward Thorne (10 August 1747 – December 9, 1820) was a political figure in Nova Scotia. He represented Granville Township in the Nova Scotia House of Assembly from 1799 to 1806.

He was born in New York and came to Nova Scotia in 1753. Thorne had married Jane Rapalye on 1 May 1773. He was named a justice of the peace shortly after his arrival; according to his obituary, he also held that post in New York for a number of years prior to his departure. He died in Granville at the age of 74.

His daughter Jane married Timothy Ruggles who also represented the township in the provincial assembly. His nephew Stephen S. Thorne also represented Granville in the assembly.
