= William Thorne (chronicler) =

British historian

William Thorne (fl. 1397) was an English Benedictine historian.

== Life ==
He was a monk of St Augustine's, Canterbury. On 19 April 1387 he was sent as proctor to secure the papal confirmation for the election of a new abbot. Detained for eight days at Orwell, he did not land till 5 May. He reached Lucca on 11 June, and then had to follow the pope from Lucca to Perugia and Rome, for more than a year. He gives a detailed negative account of the Papal Curia, with a table of charges incurred by the monastery during the vacancy. He failed to secure the confirmation, and the abbot had to come in person.

While in Italy Thorne recovered for his monastery the possession of the rectory of Littleborne, Kent, the patronage of which had passed to the monastery of St. Mary de Monte Mirteto of the order of Flora in the diocese of Velletri, where only two monks resided. He concluded his business in January 1390, and started home on the 20th. On his arrival he hurried to meet the king Richard II at Langley on 5 April.

== Works ==
His history covers the abbots of St. Augustine's, extending from the foundation to 1397. The first part to 1228 was largely taken from the work of Thomas Sprott. The work was printed by Roger Twysden in his Decem Scriptores, 1652.
