= William Henry Thorne =

Canadian politician (1844–1923)

The Hon. William Henry Thorne
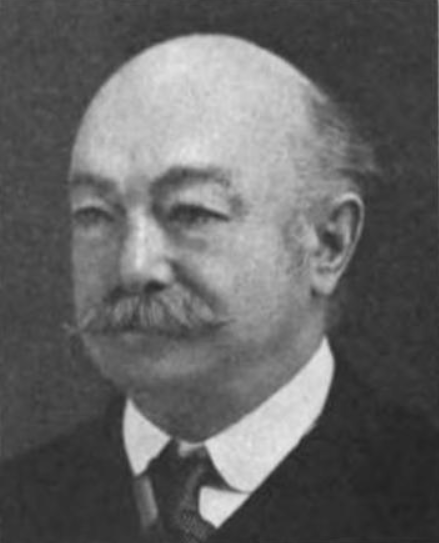

Senator for Saint John, New Brunswick
- In office 1913–1923
- Appointed by: Robert Borden

Personal details
- Born: September 12, 1844 Saint John, New Brunswick, Canada
- Died: July 8, 1923 (aged 78)
- Party: Conservative

William Henry Thorne (September 12, 1844 – July 8, 1923) was a Canadian businessman and politician.

Born in Saint John, New Brunswick, the son E. L. and Susan (Scovil) Thorne, Thorne was educated at Saint John schools, Rev. Charles Lee's Private School and Grammar School. A businessman, he was president of the Thorne Wharf and Warehousing Co., Ltd. He was a director of the Royal Bank of Canada and the Eastern Trust Company. He was president of the Saint John Board of Trade for two years. He was called to the Senate of Canada for the senatorial division of Saint John, New Brunswick, on the advice of Conservative Prime Minister Robert Borden in 1913. He served until his death in 1923.
