= List of Cornish Christians =

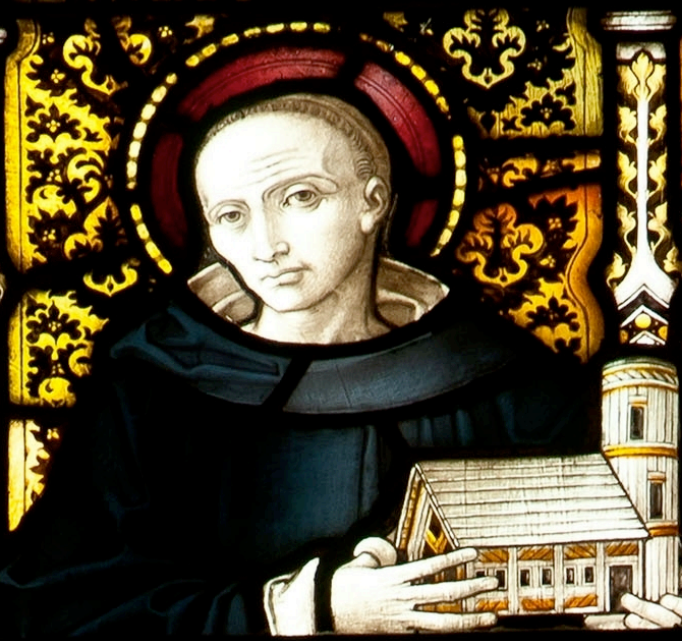
St Piran (detail of a stained glass window at Truro Cathedral)

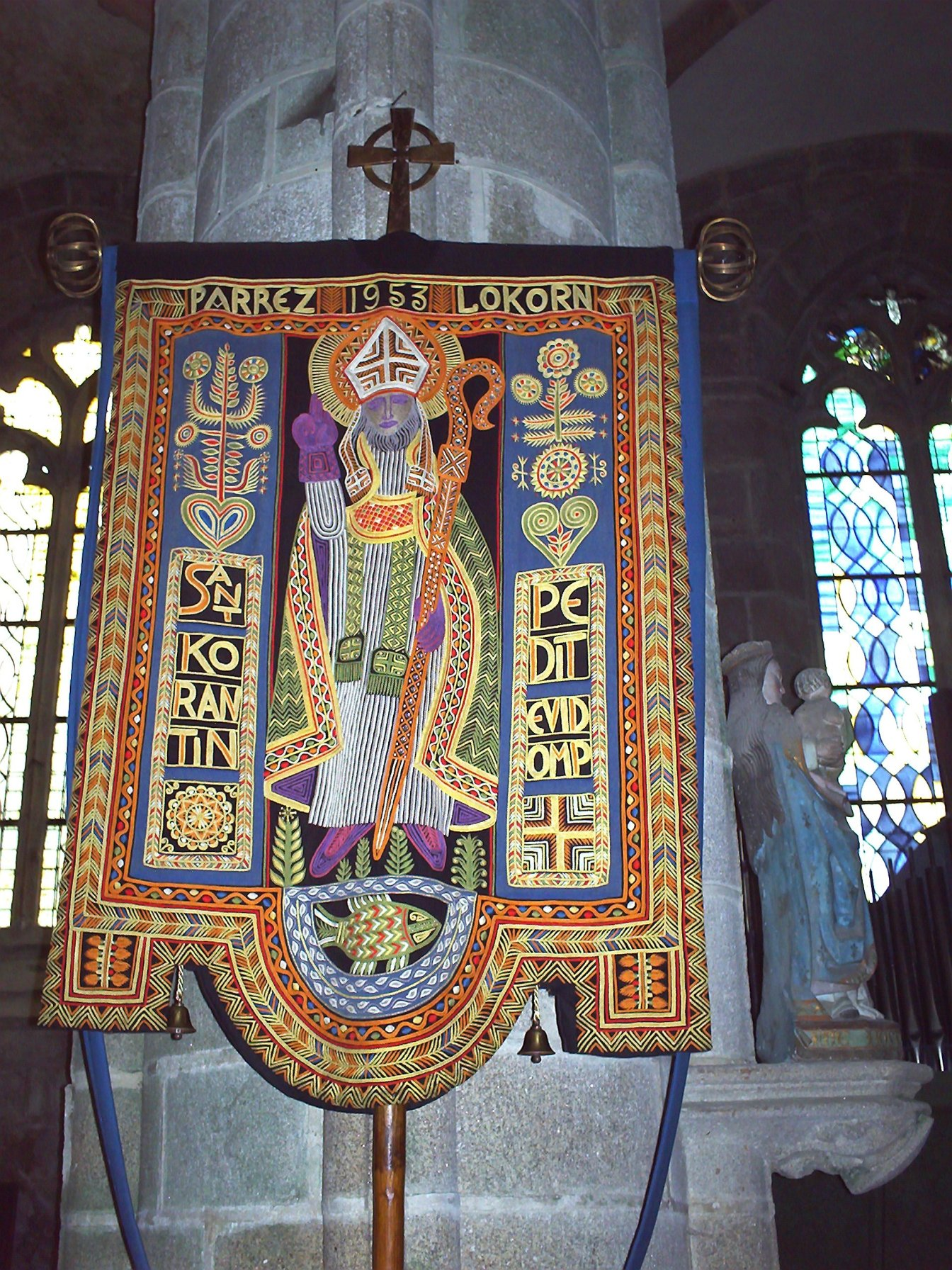
St Corentin, pictured on the banner of the parish church of Locronan, Brittany

This is a list of notable Christians from Cornwall, a county of England, in the United Kingdom.

== Medieval ==
- A reputed King of Cornwall named Constantine was venerated in Cornwall as a saint, one of several saints named Constantine known in the Celtic church
- St Corentin, missionary to Brittany
- John of Cornwall, medieval scholar
- St Petroc, a patron saint of Cornwall and of Devon
- St Piran, a patron saint of Cornwall and tin miners
- Michael Tregury, Archbishop of Dublin from 1450 to 1471 and chaplain to Henry VI
- John Trevisa, clergyman and scholar (Middle Ages)
- Thomas Vyvyan (or Vivian), prior of Bodmin and bishop of Megara (Tudor period)

== Modern (post-Reformation) ==
- Thomas Ball Barratt, Norwegian pastor and one of the founding figures of the Pentecostal movement in Europe
- William Borlase, clergyman, antiquary and naturalist
- William Trewartha Bray, Bible Christian preacher
- William Carvosso, Wesleyan Methodist
- Jack Clemo, blind poet and author from the china clay country
- John William Colenso, bishop of Natal and Zulu advocate
- William Colenso, missionary, botanist, politician, and cousin of John William Colenso
- Blessed John Cornelius, Catholic priest and Jesuit, beatified in 1929
- Gilbert Hunter Doble, Anglican clergyman and scholar
- Samuel Drew, Methodist theologian
- George Grenfell, missionary
- Venerable John Hambley (died 1587), English Catholic and martyr
- Thomas Haweis, Church of England minister who was a leading figure in the 18th century evangelical revival
- Silas Hocking, author and preacher
- Joseph Hull (1596-1665), rector at Launceston and St Buryan; controversial New England emigrant
- Joseph Hunkin, Bishop of Truro
- W. S. Lach-Szyrma, clergyman and scholar
- George Martin, Anglican priest; known as "the modern St Anthony"
- Henry Martyn, Anglican missionary to India
- William O’Bryan, founder of the Bible Christian denomination of Methodism
- John Pendarves, Puritan minister and controversialist
- Catherine Payton Phillips, Quaker minister
- Colin Podmore, ecclesiastical historian and Anglican official
- Sam Pollard, missionary and inventor of the Pollard script
- Gerald Priestland, writer and broadcaster
- Paul Robins, Bible Christian minister who emigrated to Canada
- John Rogers, biblical scholar, clergyman, geologist & botanist
- Robert Terrill Rundle, Wesleyan Methodist missionary to Canada
- Richard Rutt, Anglican bishop and Cornish bard
- Samuel Prideaux Tregelles, Biblical scholar
- Jonathan Trelawny, Anglican bishop and antagonist of James II
- Bernard Walke, Anglo-Catholic priest and author of radio plays
- John Whitaker, clergyman and scholar

== Gallery ==
George Grenfell

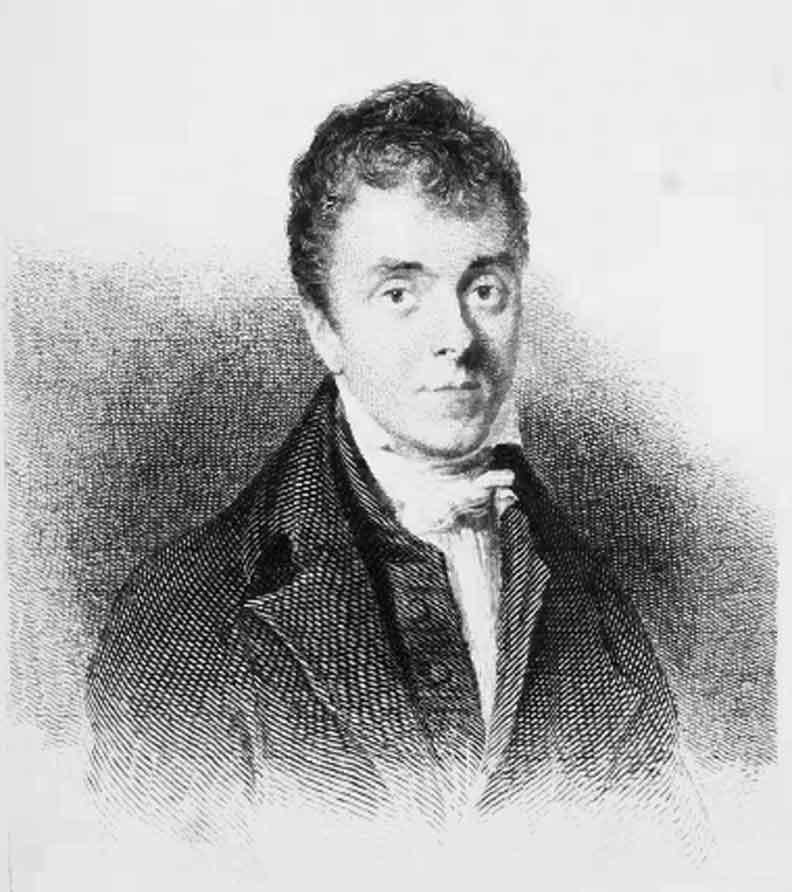
Henry Martyn, missionary to India and Persia

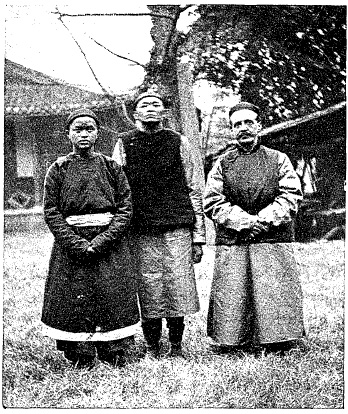
Sam Pollard with two Miao teachers

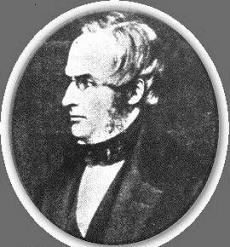
Samuel Prideaux Tregelles

== See also ==
- Bishop of Cornwall
- Bishop of Truro
- Bishop of St Germans
- List of Cornish saints
