= Ann Freeman =

British Bible Christian preacher (1797–1826)

- Born: 24 June 1797; Northlew
- Died: 7 March 1826 (aged 28); Northcott
- Known for: Preaching
- Spouse: Henry Freeman

Ann Freeman (née Mason; 24 June 1797 – 7 March 1826) was a British Bible Christian preacher.

== Life ==
Freeman was born on 24 June 1797 in Northlew in Devon. Her parents, William and Grace Mason, were farmers and she was one of thirteen children brought up in Devon where she was apprenticed to be a dressmaker. Her family moved to a farm in Northcott in Sutcombe where she and her sister Mary's religious interests caused a family dispute. She heard James Thorne of the Bible Christians when she was 19 and was immediately inspired to be a preacher. She and her sister were sent away for a few days because they had joined the Methodist Society. The Bible Christians were gaining more members and after Mary and Ann returned the numbers soon included their mother and five more of her children. They became part of this break away sect, sometimes called Bryanites, that was led by Cornishman William O'Bryan who had left the Methodist church in 1815.

She attended the fifth quarterly meeting of the Bible Christian church which was held on her aunt's property. The Bible Christians were revivalists like the early Methodist church, but they refused to conform to traditional model of a church. Ann committed herself to preaching and she abandoned her dressmaking. She would walk up to 30 miles a day travelling around Devon and Cornawall. She would preach and also withstand hostility from people who disagreed with her stance.

Women like Ann, her sister and Serena Lake made up 30% of the Bible Christians preachers, but despite this Ann and her sister attracted interest because they were women. Ann was confident and argued theological points with her movement's founder William O'Bryan when she met him at the group's first conference at Launceston in Cornwall, on 17 August 1819. She argued that Christians could find instantaneous redemption despite the prevailing view that this was gradually earned. Moreover, she argued that believers could be guided directly by God - which undermined the Church's hierarchy including O'Bryan.

By 1823 she was in London speaking on the Strand. In 1824 she impressed the Brighton Herald press when she spoke to over a 1,000 people on a nearby hill. On 9 August 1824 in London she married Henry Freeman who she had known since 1820 in Devon. The marriage, and her differences with the church, seemed to lead to her breaking with the Bible Christians, but not with evangelism. That year and the following the two of them were in Ireland where they moved to the ideas of the Quakers. They addressed people of several denominations including Catholics and Protestants. They faced hostility, and despite this and her own tuberculosis, Ann would tour by herself or just with a female friend.

Ann had to return to her parents’ house due to ill health in 1826 where she died on 7 March. She was buried a week later in Sutcombe. Her life is known because of her autobiography. Her letters, poems and journal were edited and published by her husband after she died.
