= Frederick William Bourne =

English preacher and writer

Frederick William Bourne (1830–1905) was an English Methodist preacher and author.

He was born at Woodchurch, Kent, and joined the Bible Christian Movement as a preacher. In 1866, he became the editor of the Bible Christian Magazine and led the Bible Christian movement for many years.

He wrote several books under the title "F. W. Bourne". One, The King's Son, a memoir of Billy Bray, was reprinted over fifty times.

He married Mary Horswell in 1859 and had five children before her death in 1873. He later remarried in 1876 to Adelaide Chalcraft. He died in 1905 and is buried at Lake Chapel in Shebbear, Devon.

== Bibliography ==
- The Kings Son - a memoir of Billy Bray Bible Christian Book Room, 1872
- The Centenary Life of James Thorne of Shebbear.
- The Bible Christians: Their Origin and History.
