= Northlew =

Village in Devon, England

Coordinates: 50.7721°N 4.1212°W

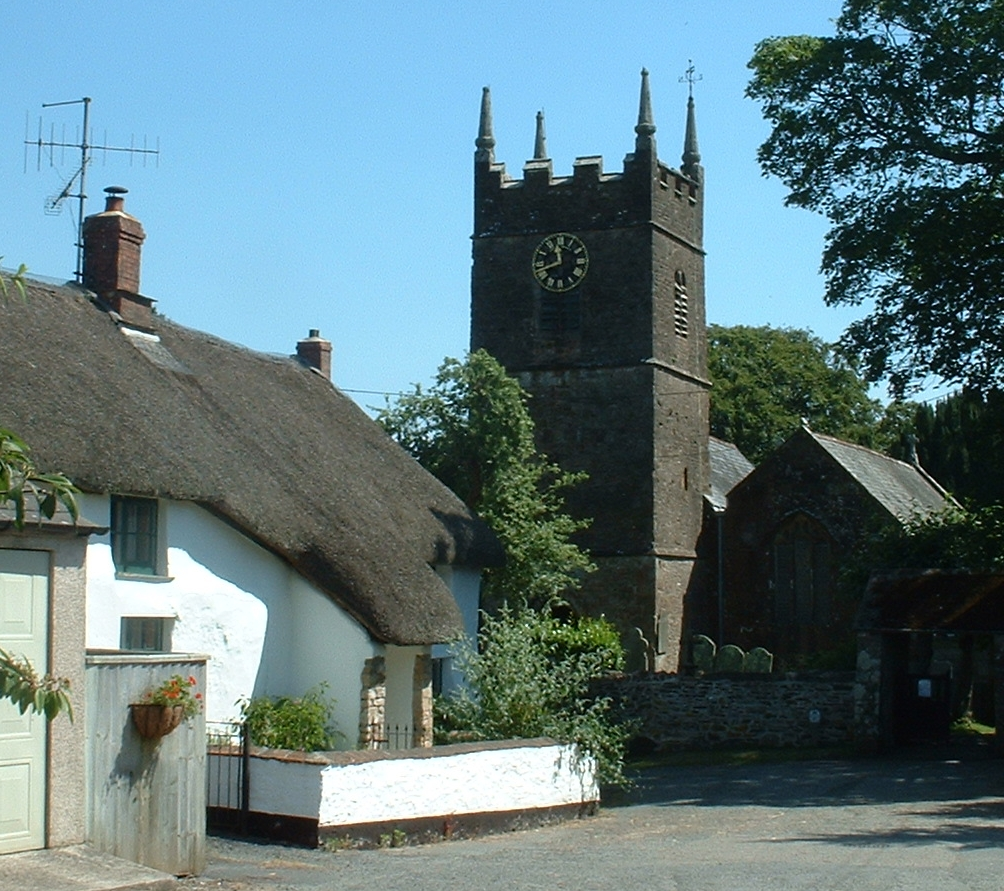
- Thatched cottage and parish church at Northlew

- Location within Devon
- Population: 592 (2001 Census)
- OS grid reference: SX504991
  - London: 207 miles (333 km)
- Civil parish: Northlew
- District: West Devon
- Shire county: Devon
- Region: South West
- Country: England
- Sovereign state: United Kingdom
- Post town: OKEHAMPTON
- Postcode district: EX20
- Dialling code: 01409
- Police: Devon and Cornwall
- Fire: Devon and Somerset
- Ambulance: South Western
- UK Parliament: Torridge and West Devon
- Website: http://www.northlew.com/

Northlew is a village and civil parish in the West Devon district of the county of Devon, England. To the west of the village, but within the parish, are the hamlets of West Kimber and East Kimber. The village falls within the electoral ward of Lew Valley. Its population at the 2011 census was 2,024.

== Geography and history ==
The village is approximately 7 miles (11 km) northwest of the town of Okehampton, and most places in the village have excellent views over Dartmoor. The village is relatively isolated, not being served by any main roads. It has an attractive main square surrounded by traditional buildings, some of them thatched; just off the square are a pub, the local primary school and two churches, the Church of England parish church of Saint Thomas of Canterbury and the Methodist church (originally Bible Christian). The evangelical Christian preacher Ann Freeman was born here in 1797. The ecclesiastical parish of Northlew has been combined with the neighbouring village of Ashbury, and since the school is a Church of England voluntary controlled school, it bears the name of both villages.

The hamlet of Crowden is on the Highampton side of the village.

Historically, Northlew formed part of Black Torrington Hundred. It gets its name from the ancient manor of Lew, mentioned in the Domesday Book; the village of Lewdown and the River Lew are nearby. The village has the melancholy distinction of having lost the highest proportion of its enlisting population of any municipality in the United Kingdom during the First World War: of 100 men who enlisted in the forces, 24 died. A stone memorial to them was recently erected in the churchyard, replacing wooden memorial tablets within the church.

Legend has it that the devil died of the cold in Northlew. There is a stone in the village that represents where the devil is meant to have died of the cold.

== The Bell Ringers song ==
The village features in the song The Bellringing popularised by Tony Rose. The song harks back to the days of "prize ringing", when bands of ringers would compete for a prize. The bells were rung in the English "full-circle" style, and the winners would be those who "struck" or caused the bells to strike, in the neatest and most regular way. The "Men of Northlew" – who "rang so steady and true", beat the bell ringers of Broadwood in two competitions; first at Ashwater Town, and then later at Callington Town. This song and "The ringers of Egloshayle" are the best known of the traditional ringing folk songs. "The Bell Ringing" was collected by the Rev S Baring Gould and published in "Songs of the West".

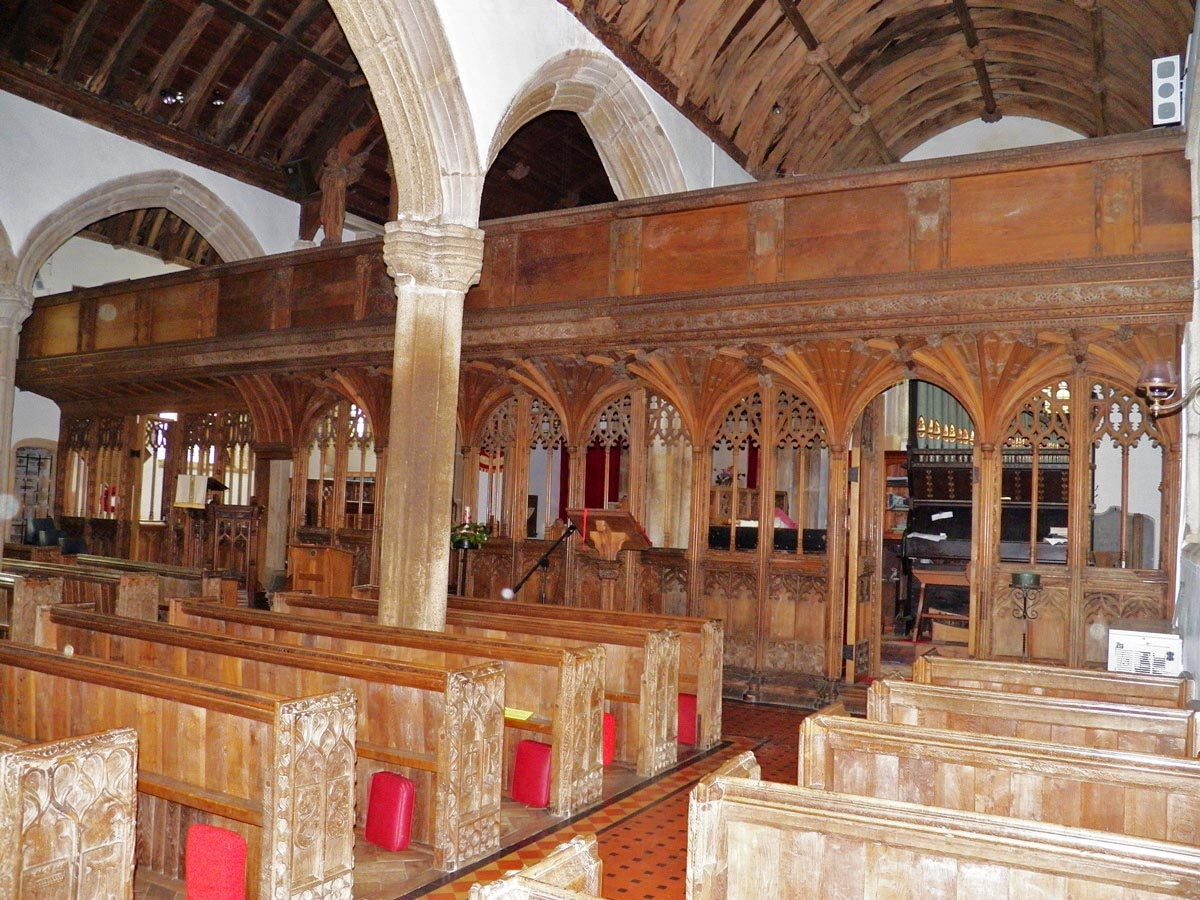
The interior of Northlew church, showing the magnificent rood screen

== Telephone kiosk ==
In 2009 BT decided to decommission Northlews only public telephone kiosk due to it being 'uneconomical'. The kiosk in Northlew has stood on the same site since 1939 and is one of the few remaining K6 boxes designed by architect Sir Giles Scott to commemorate the silver jubilee of King George V. Five directors of Nothlew broadband decided to take it over with the assistance of Northlew Parish Council. They then re-activated the kiosk back into a working telephone box; the very first village in the UK to do so.

== WW1 memorial ==
Northlew, lost proportionately more young men from the enlisted population than any other town city or place in the UK, as such the residents of Northlew agreed to honour them with the world's longest Poppy Avenue of just over 10 miles (20 miles of verges) from the town of Okehampton to Broadbury via Northlew. This involved the planting of over 360 Million poppy seeds.

The project will break a number of world records; namely, The world's longest poppy avenue, The world's longest carpet of flowers beating the People's Republic Of China by 8.6 miles. It will also be the longest War Memorial in the Northern Hemisphere.

On the evening of 28 June 2014, Christopher Marson designed and hosted an international evening attended by almost 1500 people and leading international media companies to mark the passage of 100 years. This included an original SE5 Bi plane flypast, Various military agencies and a 3D projection onto the ancient Saxon square to give the impression of being on the battlefield. The link to the evening can be found here. Northlew WW1 Memorial

Sutton Seeds who is the UK's main supplier of seeds also supplied over 42 Kilos of poppy seeds to the village have also agreed to name a Poppy, 'The Northlew Poppy' They also donated a Canadian Oak Tree which will grow to be the tallest tree in the village and turn a blood red around Armistice day in memorial of our fallen, it can be found in the village park. This was planted by Christopher Marson (On Behalf of the village of Northlew) Mark Parkhouse (Lord Lieutenant of Devon) on behalf of Queen Elizabeth II, Nick McKinnel (Bishop of Crediton) and the MD of Sutton Seeds Bernard Bejar. Prayers were said in the name of peace.
