= Bible Christian Chapel, St Agnes, Isles of Scilly =

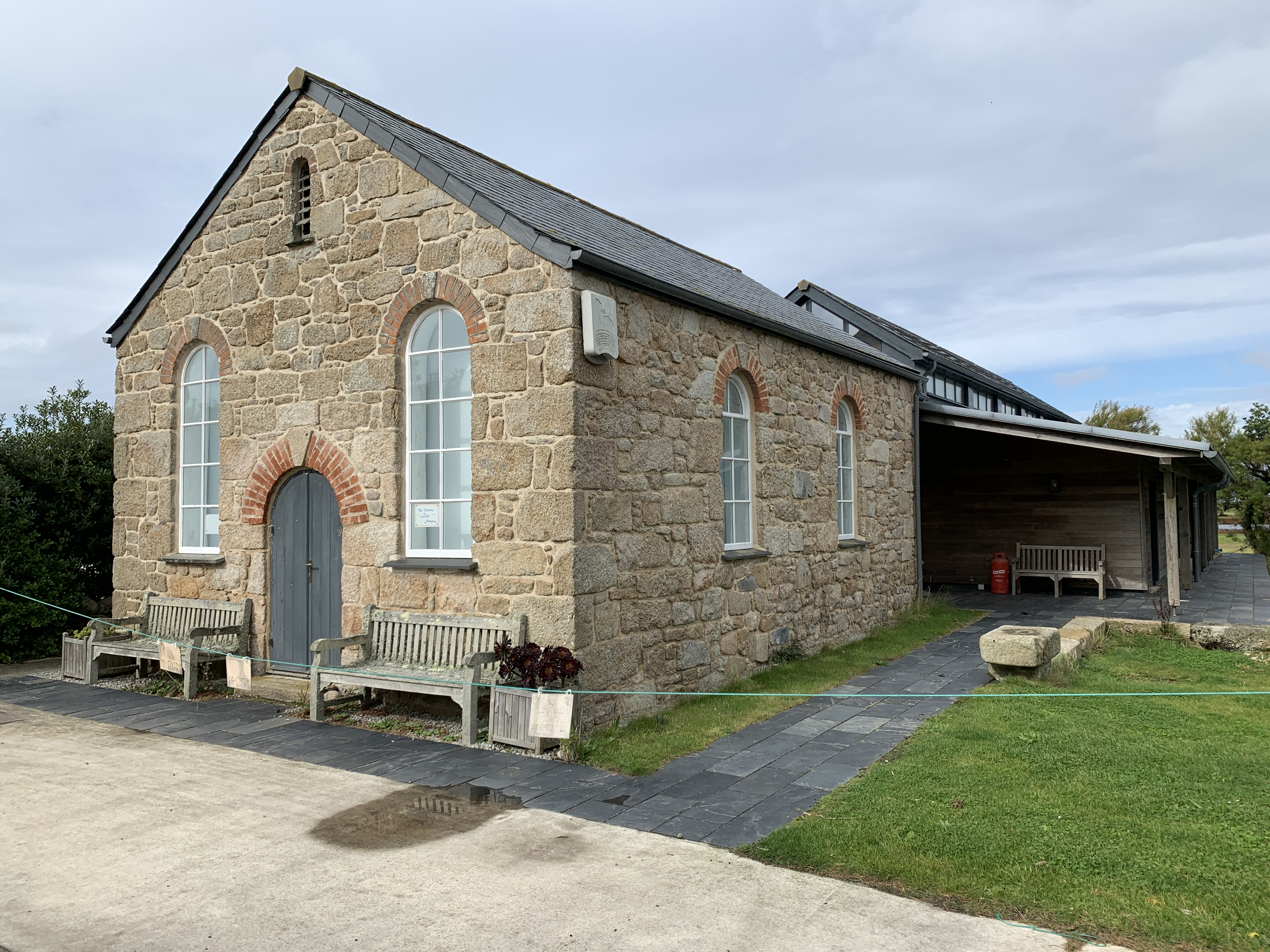
- Bible Christian Chapel, St Agnes
- Bible Christian Chapel, St Agnes, Isles of Scilly
- 49°53′38.23″N 6°20′51.88″W
- Location: St Agnes, Isles of Scilly
- Country: England
- Denomination: Methodist
- Previous denomination: Bible Christian

Architecture
- Completed: 24 July 1874

The Bible Christian Chapel, St Agnes was a Bible Christian chapel in St Agnes, Isles of Scilly.

== History ==
Bible Christians arrived in St Agnes in the 1830s. Initially they worshipped in a meeting-house but eventually were able to build their own chapel. The current chapel was built at a cost of around £156 (equivalent to £15,300 in 2025) and was opened on 24 July 1874.

In 1907, the Bible Christian Church in England was amalgamated with the United Methodist Free Churches and the Methodist New Connexion, to form the United Methodist Church.

On closure the building became the island reading room and later the island hall. In 2014 the Island Hall was extended at a cost of £2.4m to the designs of Poynton Bradbury Wynter Cole, Architects, to provide 6 workspaces and a community hub.
