= Eynon =

Eynon may refer to:

== People ==
- Eynon Evans (1904–1989), a Welsh writer and film actor
- Eynon Hawkins (1920–2001), holder of the Albert Medal and George Cross, and Welsh professional rugby league footballer
- John Eynon (?–1539), a monk and priest martyred during the English dissolution of the monasteries
- John Hicks Eynon (1801–1888), a Bible Christian minister born in China
- Kerry Eynon (1971-present), former New Zealand professional rugby footballer

== Places ==
- Port Eynon, a village and community in the city and county of Swansea, Wales
- Eynon, a village in the borough of Archbald, Pennsylvania, United States
