= Shebbear College =

Location
- Shebbear, Devon, EX21 5HO; England
- Coordinates: 50.864°N 4.204°W

Information
- Type: Private day and boarding school
- Motto: Ad Gloriam Per Spinas ("To Glory Through Thorns")
- Religious affiliation: Methodist
- Established: 1829 - Founded as 'Prospect College'; 1841 - Re-founded as 'Shebbear College'
- Founder: Bible Christian Church
- Department for Education URN: 113605 Tables
- Ofsted: Reports
- Head: Charlie Jenkins
- Gender: Coeducational
- Age: 3 to 18
- Enrolment: 300 as of January 2020
- Houses: Way; Thorne; Ruddle; Pollard
- Colours: Red, Gold, Navy Blue & Black
- Former pupils: Old Shebbearians
- School song: Integer Vitae Scelerisque Purus
- Website: https://www.shebbearcollege.co.uk

Shebbear College is an all-through private co-educational day and boarding school for pupils aged 4 – 18 situated in Shebbear, Devon, England. The school's 85-acre rural campus is situated in the Devon countryside.

It was founded by the Bible Christian Society in 1829.

== History ==
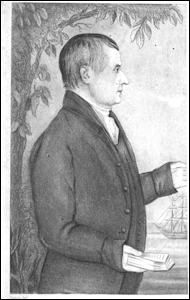
William O'Bryan, founder of the Bible Christian Church

=== Bible Christian Church ===
The Bible Christian Church was one of the denominations that merged in the United Methodist Church in 1907. Its early preachers appealed solely to the Bible in confirmation of their doctrines. The denomination arose in the agricultural districts and fishing villages of north Cornwall and Devon; a district only slightly influenced by John Wesley and the original Methodist movement. The founder of the movement was William O'Bryan, a Wesleyan Methodist lay preacher of Luxulyan, Cornwall. O'Bryan commenced his labours in north Devon, and in 1815 a small society was formed at Lake Farm, Shebbear.

On O'Bryan's departure, the first fully recognised minister James Thorne, at whose father's farm the connexion had started, became its leader. Thorne laid the foundations broadly in evangelism, finance, temperance and education.

=== Prospect College ===
Shebbear College began its life in 1829. James Thorne's two sons, John and Samuel, began a Christian school for 20 boys called Prospect College after the name of the house built to accommodate the school. It was originally formed for the sons of Bible Christians to train for the ministry. The emblem 'PC' still remains engraved on the main gates to this day.

=== Shebbear College ===
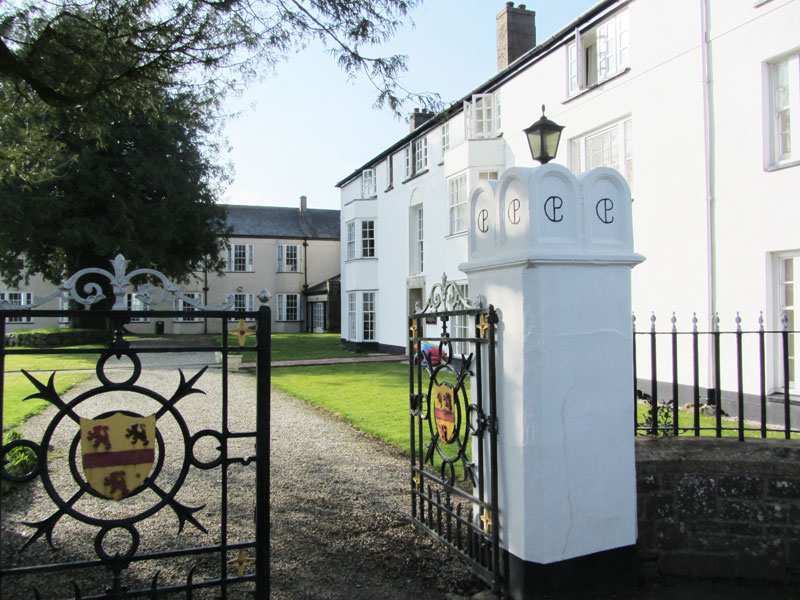
Original college gate with Prospect College emblem

The school saw many changes until it was re-founded by the Bible Christian Church in 1841 as Shebbear College. The first headmaster was an Irish clergyman, Rev. H. C. O'Donoghue, formerly Chaplain to William IV, who had seceded from the Established Church on conscientious grounds.

The Earl of Portsmouth opened a block of new buildings at Shebbear College in 1878, and offered a £5 prize for the best essay on "The Effect of the Revolution of 1688 on Constitutional Progress and National Life."

In October 1882, Sir Thomas Dyke Acland, 11th Baronet urged upon the College authorities the immediate building of a science laboratory. He himself subscribed liberally to the funds necessary for such a purpose and his example was followed by William James Harris (M.P. for Poole), a great friend of the College. This formed part of a new scheme of extension, including a new wing to the main complex, which was opened by Sir Thomas Acland in 1884.

Edgehill College, founded for Methodist girls in nearby Bideford in 1884, was considered the college's 'sister-college'.

In 1891 Sir Samuel Way visited England and purchased the freehold of Lake Farm in Shebbear, and then conveyed it to Shebbear College as an endowment.

Numerous missionaries from Shebbear College were sent to China in the Bible Christian Mission. This mission included Samuel Pollard, creator of Pollard script (Chinese: 柏格理苗文 Bó Gélǐ Miao-wen). The main building of the Hopkins–Nanjing Center is named in Pollard's honour.

The present school still includes many original buildings and features, as well as buildings erected for the boarders. Shebbear College now offers education for boys and girls aged 3–18, having become co-educational in 1993.

The college is small in size and has attendance of 340 pupils as of March 2017, from ages 3 to 18.

== Houses ==
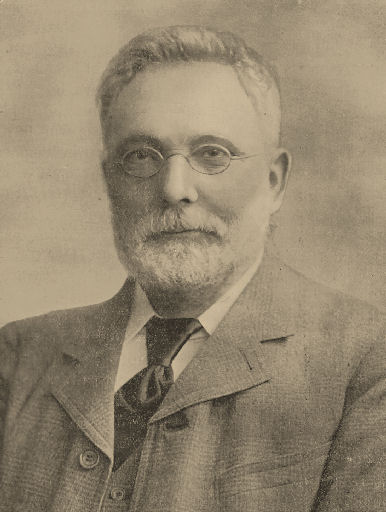
Thomas Ruddle, Headmaster of Shebbear College from 1864 to 1909

=== Day Houses ===
The college is divided into four day houses that compete both academically and in sport; namely:

- Ruddle - named after the College's most influential headmaster, Thomas Ruddle.
- Thorne - named after one of the founders of the College, Samuel Thorne.
- Way - named after Sir Samuel Way.
- Pollard - after Samuel Pollard.

=== Boarding Houses ===
Two of these houses are also boarding houses:

- Ruddle - girls' boarding house
- Pollard - boys' boarding house

== Facilities ==
The College stands in 62 acres of grounds with a mix of formal gardens, lawns, open fields and woodland. Its facilities include:

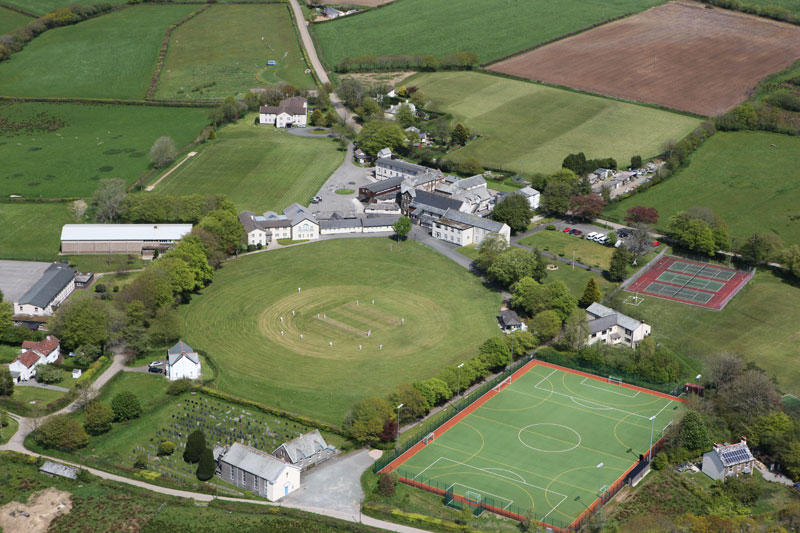
An aerial view of the college grounds

- Sports Centre: includes gym and dance studio
- All-weather pitch
- Preparatory School
- Pre-prep school
- Sixth Form Centre (Saltmarsh Building)- officially opened by Sir Gary Sobers on 1 July 2016
- Music Centre - officially opened by Peter Gordeno (musician) on 27 April 2018
- 5 car parks
- 3 boarding houses
- Two biomass plants
- Solar panel field
- New dining facilities
- Modern Languages department - opened by Michael Morpurgo on 1 July 2011
- Library
- Life Skills Centre
- Science block
- Two assembly halls

== Old Shebbearians ==
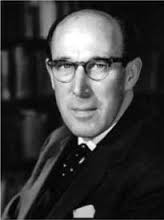
Sir Ivan Stedeford GBE

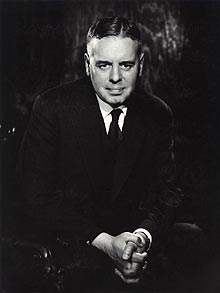
Charles Kingsley Barrett FBA

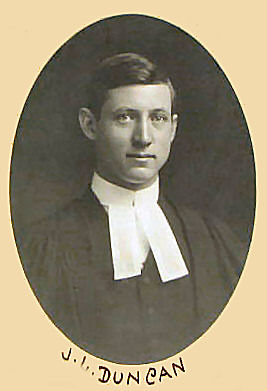
James Lewis Duncan

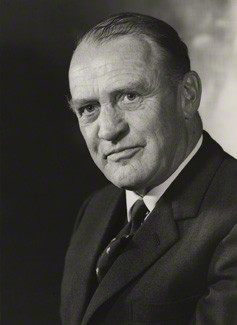
Sir Alfred Earle GBE

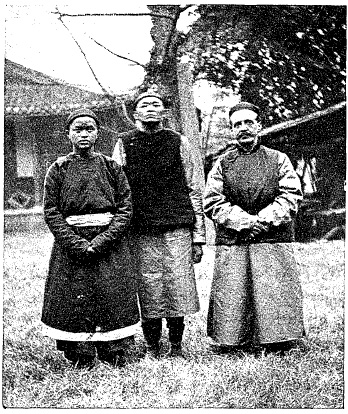
Samuel Pollard

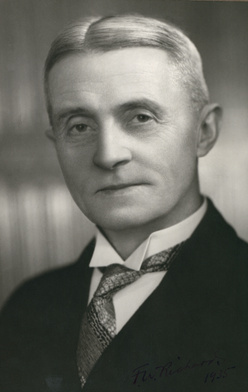
Sir Frederick William Richards

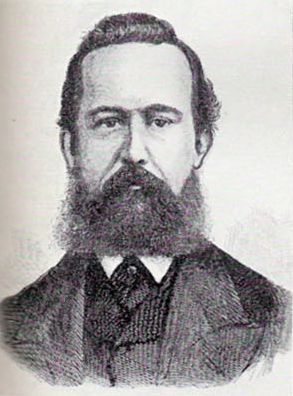
John Damrel Prior

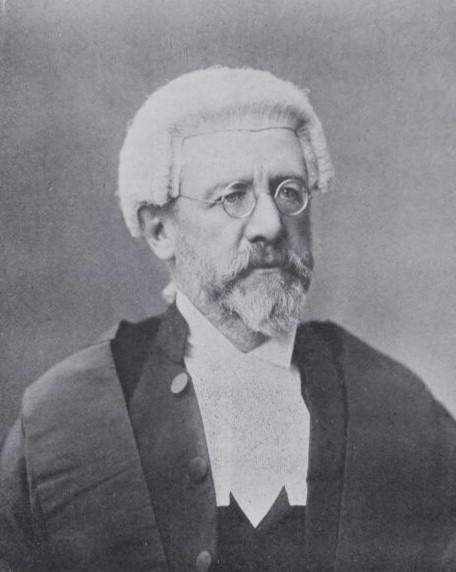
Sir Samuel Way, 1st Baronet

William Woolcock CMG CBE MP

Alumni of Shebbear College are known as Old Shebbearians. Notable alumni include:

- Charles Kingsley Barrett FBA (1917–2011) - British biblical scholar
- John Cater - Actor
- James Lewis Duncan (1892–1960) - Canadian politician and lawyer
- Steve Drowne - Jockey; Winner, 2000 Coventry Stakes at Royal Ascot
- Sir Alfred Earle GBE (1907–1990) - RAF Vice Chief of Defence to Lord Mountbatten of Burma; Director General of British Defence Intelligence 1966-1968
- Thomas Saunders Hobbs (1856–1927) - English-born Ontario merchant and political figure
- Samuel Pollard (1864–1915) - British Methodist missionary to China and creator of Pollard script
- John Damrel Prior (1840 – 1923) - British trade unionist.
- Sir Frederick William Richards (1869-1957) - Australian jurist
- Sir Ivan Stedeford GBE (1897–1975) - Chairman & CEO Tube Investments Leading British Industrialist
- Sir Samuel Way, 1st Baronet QC (1836-1916) - Chief Justice and Lieutenant-Governor of South Australia and Chancellor of the University of Adelaide
- Hugh F. Durrant-Whyte - pioneer in probabilistic methods for robotics.
- William Woolcock (1878–1947) - Member of Parliament for Hackney Central

== Headteachers ==
- Samuel Thorne (1831–1841)
- The Reverend Hallifield Cosgayne O'Donnoghue (1841–1842)
- The Reverend William Kelly (1847–1855)
- Thomas Ruddle (1864–1909)
- J.Rounsefell (1909–1932)
- Leslie Johnson (1933–1942)
- Jack B. Morris (1942–1964)
- George Washington Kingsnorth (1964–1983)
- Russell Buley (1983–1997)
- Leslie Clarke (1997–2003)
- Robert Barnes (2003–2013)
- Simon Weale (2013–2019)
- Caroline Kirby (2019–2022)
- Charlie Jenkins (2022–Present)
