= Sarah Lindsay Evans =

Australian temperance activist (1816–1898)

- Born: Sarah Lindsay Angas; 13 November 1816; Newcastle-on-Tyne, England
- Died: 6 June 1898 (aged 81); Evandale, near Angaston
- Occupation: temperance movement activist
- Organizations: Woman's Christian Temperance Union
- Spouse: Henry Evans (m. 1837)
- Children: 1

Sarah Lindsay Evans, née Angas, (13 November 1816 – 6 June 1898) was a 19th-century English-born South Australian pioneer and an activist in the country's temperance movement.

== Early life ==
Angas was born at Newcastle-on-Tyne, England, 13 November 1816. Her parents were George Fife Angas, who took a deep interest in the welfare of South Australia, and Rosetta French (1793–1867), daughter of John French (1761–1829), "Gentleman of Hutton, Essex", and Rosetta French née Rayner (1756–1836). Sarah's siblings included: Rosetta, Emma, George, John, Mary, and William.

== Career ==
She married Henry Evans (1812 – 14 April 1868), of Exeter, on 8 August 1837. They had one child, Henry Angas Evans (Note: Henry Angas Evans established "Ivanhoe", adjoining his parents' "Evandale" in Keyneton, and pioneered dried fruit production, which developed into a thriving export business. He married Marianne Price (died 12 October 1928) on 5 August 1863; they had ten surviving children.) (c. 1839 – 4 September 1901). They emigrated to South Australia in 1843 in the barque Madras, T. Kitching master, arriving on 12 September 1843. They settled at the Valley House, "Tarrawatta", in what became the Flaxman Valley, and ran a flock of sheep. They built "Lindsay House", living there for a time and planting out a fine garden, before selling it to George Fife Angas some time around 1850. They then established "Evandale" at Keyneton, establishing its garden, vineyard and orchard.

Evans' husband died in 1868 and in 1870 she "took the pledge" of total abstinence. Soon, she became so opposed to the use and manufacture of alcoholic beverages that she had the vineyards of the estate —which had produced the notable Evandale wines— uprooted, and the huge wine cellar converted into a temperance meeting-place. The large wine vat was turned upside down and made into a platform. She built a new hall especially for this purpose at a cost of £450, the foundation-stone of which was laid by her brother, John, in 1872. In the same year, she established the North Rhine Band of Hope.

Evans interested herself in the neighbouring townships. No sooner was the township of Keyneton surveyed and laid out in allotments, than Evans bought the whole of them, and in the centre of four crossroads leading to Angaston, Sedan, Truro, and Eden Valley, erected a large temperance hotel costing £1,500. Here, only non-alcoholic beverages were dispensed.

Evans was prominently identified with temperance work in South Australia, giving her support to the South Australian Alliance and other temperance organizations. The South Australian Band of Hope and Gospel Temperance Union, recognizing the value of her counsel and help, made Evans patron of the society. So great was her influence that nearly all the members on the church roll became total abstainers, and nearly all the children of the Sunday school were members of the Band of Hope. She was, with Hannah Chewings, Mary Jane George, Maria Peacock Henderson, Serena Lake, and Elizabeth Webb Nicholls a trustee of the Woman's Christian Temperance Union (W.C.T.U.) when it was incorporated in 1891.

== Death ==
Evans died at Evandale, near Angaston on 6 June 1898. Her estate was sworn, for probate purposes, at £190,000.
