= Payneham Cemetery =

Cemetery in Payneham South, Adelaide, South Australia

- Interactive map of Payneham Cemetery

Details
- Established: 1864
- Location: Marian Road, Payneham South, South Australia
- Country: Australia
- Coordinates: 34°54′08″S 138°38′38″E
- Owned by: Payneham and Dudley Park Cemeteries Trust Inc
- No. of interments: >10,000
- Find a Grave: Payneham Cemetery

Payneham Cemetery is a cemetery in Adelaide, South Australia. Located on Marian Road, Payneham South, it was established by the Argent Street Primitive Methodist Church, with the first burial occurring in 1864.

== History ==
The land (Allotment 107 of Section 285) was purchased by the Argent Street Church Trustees from Henry Ellis in 1846. A Primitive Methodist church was opened in 1859, and burials commenced in the cemetery in 1864.

There has been significant grave reuse to the extent that the cemetery was considered not eligible for State heritage protection in 1990. On 26 October 2006, the 1864 cemetery reserve, all headstones and monuments were added to the local register.

== Interments ==
- Gustave Adrian Barnes (1877–1921) – artist
- Fanny Kate Boadicea Cocks (1875–1954) – policewoman and welfare worker
- Sir Darcy Rivers Warren Cowan (1885–1958) – medical practitioner and advocate of effective treatment of tuberculosis
- John Creswell (1858–1909) – company secretary
- Samuel Forsyth (1881–1960) – Methodist minister and Ida Muriel Forsyth née Brummitt (1884–1953) – nurse and community worker
- Richard Witty Foster (1856–1932) – storekeeper, farmer and politician
- Alfred Edward Gerard (1877–1950) – merchant and Aboriginal welfare worker
- Reginald Charles (Rex) Ingamells (1913–1955) – poet and editor
- Robert Kelly (1845–1920) – pastoralist and politician
- Andrew Alexander Kirkpatrick (1848–1928) – printer and politician
- Serena Lake (1842–1902) – evangelist and suffragist
- Sir Edward Lucas (1857–1950) – draper and politician
- James Waddell Marshall (1845–1925) – merchant
- Robert Mitchell (1851–1929) – Presbyterian clergyman
- Elizabeth Webb Nicholls (1850–1943) – social reformer
- George Searcy (1855–1927) – Australian sportsman, sports official, and accountant
- Brian Wibberley (died 1944) – minister of Kent Town Methodist Church
