= Robert Mitchell (Presbyterian minister) =

Australian Presbyterian minister (1851–1929)

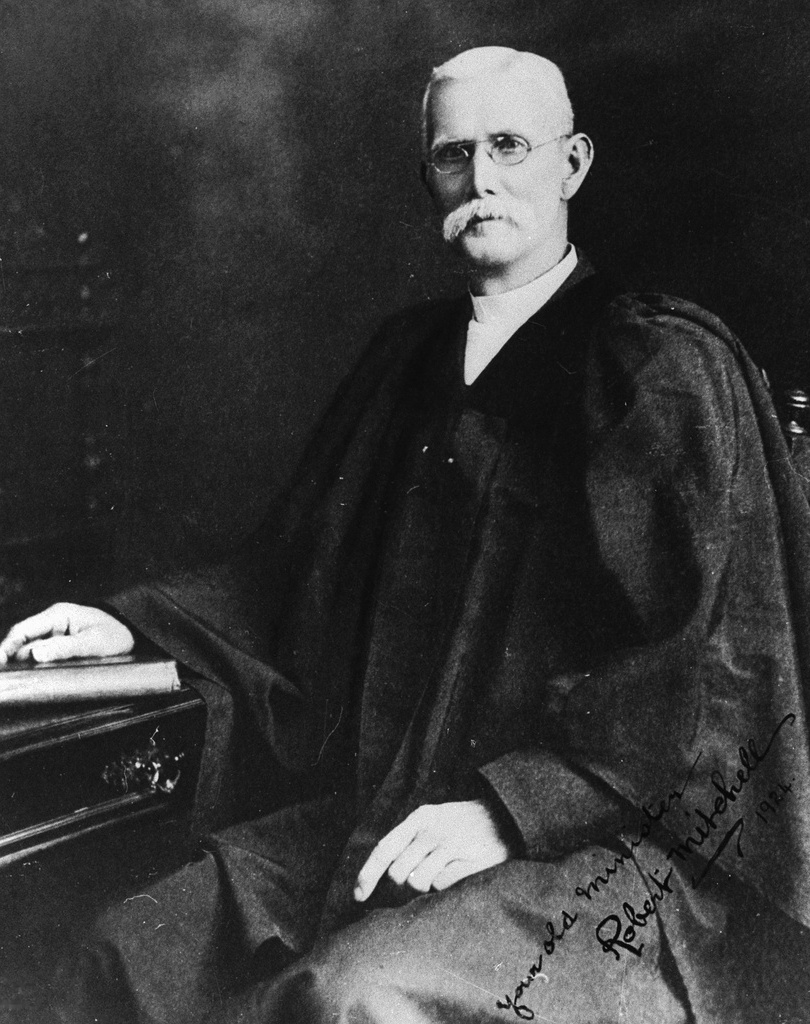
Rev. Robert Mitchell, associated with the Mitchell Memorial Church, Goodwood, 1924

Robert Mitchell (1851–1929) was an Australian Presbyterian minister who became the first Presbyterian to be ordained in South Australia.

== Childhood ==
Mitchell arrived in Adelaide, South Australia as an infant in 1855 with his parents, Robert and Agnes, and older brother Thomas, from Scotland. He attended Salt Creek School and North Adelaide Grammar School prior to commencing studies for the ministry in 1868.

== Service as Minister ==
In 1872 he began pastoral work in Clare. In 1882 he set up a congregation in Port Augusta. In 1884 he and Rev. W. F. Main organized the Smith of Dunesk Mission. The mission's base was at Beltana and the parish covered 77,700 km². Mitchell was the first missionary at Beltana and for the next four years Mitchell travelled widely and provided a range of services, including first aid and dentistry, in addition to the usual religious services.

His work underpinned that of Rev. John Flynn and the development of the Royal Flying Doctor Service.

== Death ==
He died at Goodwood in 1929 and was buried in Payneham Cemetery.
