= Edward Lucas (Australian politician) =

Australian politician

The Honourable Sir Edward Lucas
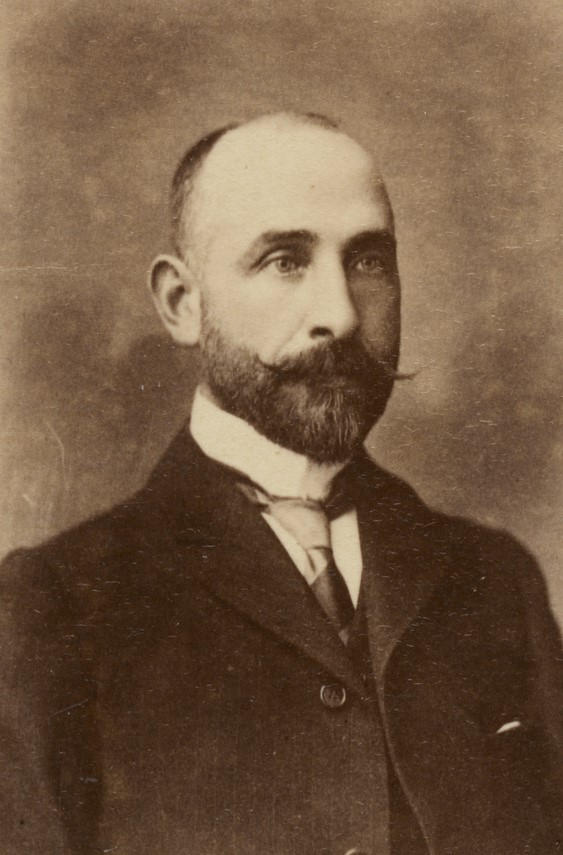
- Edward Lucas c. 1902

Member of the South Australian Legislative Council for North-Eastern District
- In office 19 May 1900 – 6 April 1918
- Parliamentary group: Australasian National League (until 1910); Liberal Union (from 1910)

Agent-General for South Australia
- In office 1918 – 1925
- Preceded by: Frederick William Young
- Succeeded by: John Price

Personal details
- Born: 14 February 1857 County Cavan, Ireland
- Died: 4 July 1950 (aged 93) Medindie, South Australia
- Resting place: Payneham Cemetery
- Spouses: Frances Louisa Johnson (m. 1885; died 1887) Mabel Florence Brock (m. 1890)
- Occupation: Draper

Sir Edward Lucas (14 February 1857 – 4 July 1950) was an Australian politician. He was a member of the South Australian Legislative Council from 1900 to 1918, associated with the Australasian National League and its successor, the Liberal Union. He resigned in 1918 to become Agent-General for South Australia, a role he held until 1925.

Lucas was born in County Cavan, Ireland, and was educated at Bailieborough. He worked as a draper's apprentice in Dublin, before migrating to South Australia in 1878. He initially worked for John Martin's, but established his own drapery in North Adelaide in 1882, and built a partnership with several stores. Lucas moved to Gawler in 1886, purchasing the business of J. & J. Wilcox, which he operated until 1901; he also maintained stores in Adelaide, Hamley Bridge and Balaklava, only selling the latter in 1918. He was mayor of the Corporate Town of Gawler in 1893 and 1894, served as president of the Gawler Institute, and was involved with the School of Mines' School Board of Advice, and the committee supporting the Barossa Water Scheme. He married Frances Louisa Johnson in 1885, but she died following the birth of their first child. He remarried in 1890, to Mabel Florence Brock.

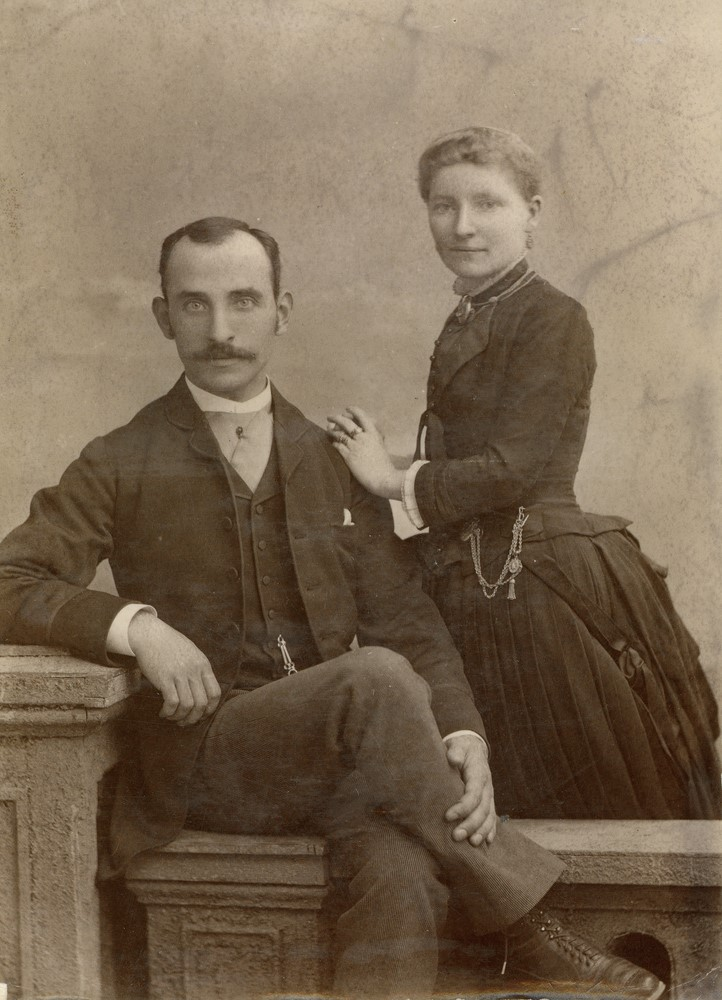
Edward and Mabel Lucas, c. 1890

Lucas was elected to the South Australian Legislative Council in 1900, representing the Midland District. He was involved in the merger that created the state's first united conservative party, the Liberal Union in 1910, and served as its leader in the Legislative Council from 1913. During World War I, he was a member of the State War Council and was vice-chairman of the State Recruiting Committee. In 1918, he was appointed Agent-General in London, serving until 1925. In this role, he was tasked with representing South Australia in England through the aftermath of the war; while there, he was knighted in 1921, and was a commissioner of the British Empire Exhibition in 1924. Before arriving in London Lucas met Indigenous Australian Harry Hewitt in Victor Harbor, where he was taught by the latter how to throw a boomerang. Lucas used this knowledge to provide demonstrations of throwing the boomerang in London's Regent's Park, crediting Hewitt for his proficiency.

He was involved in a wide range of community organisations, including the Navy League, which he served as state president of for many years, the District and Bush Nursing Society, the Prisoners' Aid Society, and the YMCA. He was a lay preacher in the Methodist Church, and represented it on the Council of Churches. He made a final bid for political office at the 1928 federal election, unsuccessfully contesting a Senate seat for the Nationalist Party.

Lucas died in 1950 at his home in Medindie, aged 93, and was buried in Payneham Cemetery. His death was reported in newspapers nationally. He was survived by two daughters; his second wife, one son and one daughter predeceased him.

Diplomatic posts
Preceded by Frederick William Young	Agent-General for South Australia; 1918–1925	Succeeded by John Price
