= Serena Lake =

South Australian evangelical preacher and suffragist

Serena Thorne Lake
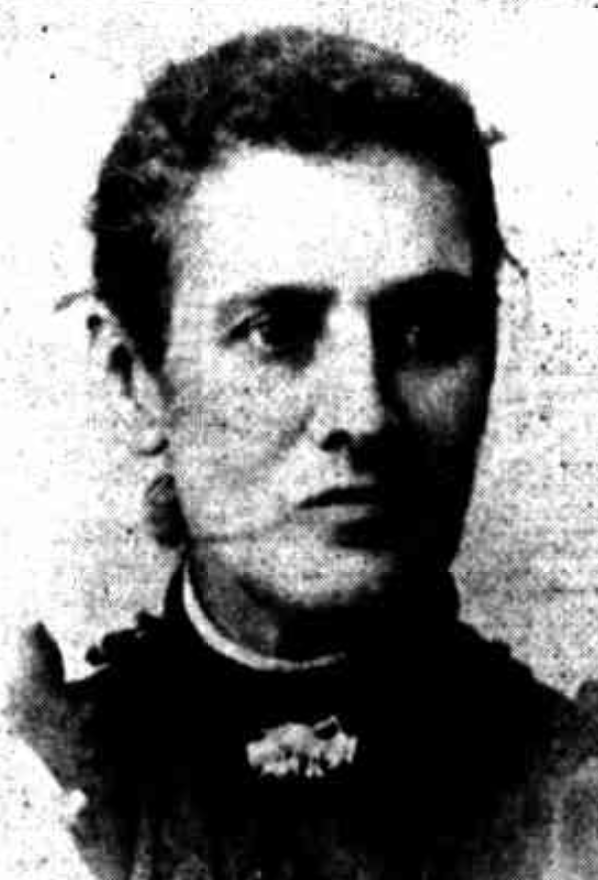
- Born: Serena Thorne; 28 October 1842; Shebbear, Devon, England
- Died: 9 July 1902 (aged 59); Adelaide, South Australia
- Resting place: Payneham Cemetery
- Occupation: preacher Bible Christian church
- Known for: women's suffragette and temperance
- Spouse: Octavius Lake (1841–1922),
- Children: Lucy Mary Andrews (1871–1965); Florence Thorne Lake (1873–1962)–(artist); Catherine Thorne Lake (1875–1875); Octavius Lake (1876–1877); Thorne Lake (1877–1880); Mary Thorne Lake (1879–1880); Enid Thorne Lake (1881–1882); George Thorne Lake (1883–1885)
- Parent(s): Samuel and Mary Thorne
- Relatives: William O’Bryan (grandfather)

Serena Lake (née Thorne) (28 October 1842 – 9 July 1902) was an English Australian suffragist, temperance activist, and evangelical preacher in South Australia.

== Early life ==
Serena Thorne was born in England at Shebbear, Devon. She was the daughter of Bible Christian Methodist preachers, Samuel and Mary Thorne. Her grandfather, William O’Bryan was the founder of the Bible Christian Church.

Bible Christians allowed women preachers and by the age of 21 she was a widely known preacher through Devon, Cornwall and South Wales.

== Australia ==
Serena Thorne was sent to preach and help establish Bible Christianity in Queensland, Australia in 1865 and in 1870 she was invited by Samuel Way and Dr Allan Campbell to preach at Bible Christian Churches in Adelaide, South Australia. She preached to large crowds in Adelaide and travelled widely amongst the parishes of South Australia.

In March 1871 Lake married Reverend Octavius Lake (1841 – 9 September 1922), whom she had previously known in England. They were married by Rev. James Way in Samuel Way's house in Adelaide on 2 March 1871. Between 1873 and 1883 she gave birth to seven children only one of whom survived to adulthood.

== Women's Suffrage League ==
In 1888 Lake was involved in the foundation meeting of the South Australian Women's Suffrage League and was appointed to the council. Lake believed gender equality was "the original design of the Creator" and combined her passion for women's suffrage with her evangelical passion. Lake shared platforms with suffragists such as Mary Lee, and used logic, wit and evangelical fervour to argue in favour of women's suffrage.

Lake was a strong believer in the evils of alcohol and felt confident that once women had the vote it would help to end the liquor trade.

== Woman's Christian Temperance Union ==
In 1889 Lake was appointed to the position of Colonial Organiser of the Woman's Christian Temperance Union of South Australia as well as Suffrage superintendent of the Union. Lake travelled widely across South Australia, as well as to Broken Hill, to enrol new members and establish branches of the Union throughout country South Australia. She was, with Elizabeth Webb Nicholls (1850–1943), Maria Peacock Henderson, Mary Jane George, Hannah Chewings, and Sarah Lindsay Evans a trustee of the Union when it was incorporated in 1891. She also spread the women's suffrage message through the Union in her role as Suffrage superintendent. In an 1890 report to the Union, Lake recorded 27 new Unions she had organised across South Australia.

Lake requested each of the 65 South Australian Unions to report on the works of their women's suffrage departments, however, in her 1891 report she noted that only half replied and some did not have suffrage departments. The 1891 report provided information on the progress of women's suffrage legislation and contained an appeal from Lake to members to spread the suffrage work.

A quote from Lake's 1891 report states: "The aim of our work is to wake both men and women up to the injustice and absurdity of a national life in which the mother influence has no acknowledged authority or legal recognition.".

In 1891, Lake was made a life vice-president of the Union and stepped down from her other roles in the Union.

== Later life ==
In the last ten years of her life, Lake devoted herself to evangelical and humanitarian causes. Lake was involved in the establishment of the Bible Christian Woman's Missionary Board to support missionary work in China and in 1892 she became the superintendent of evangelists.

Lake died in Adelaide, South Australia, on 9 July 1902 and is buried in Payneham Cemetery. Octavius survived her by 20 years, and was an important figure in the unified Methodist Church in South Australia.

A cousin, John Thorne (17 April 1838 – 22 August 1914), served the church in the northern areas of South Australia, arriving in 1873.
