= James Thorne (preacher) =

English Methodist Bible Christian preacher

James Thorne (1795–1872), was an English Methodist preacher, leader of the Bible Christian Church and editor of the Bible Christian Magazine.

== Biography ==
James Thorne was born at North Furze Farm, Shebbear, Devonshire, on 21 September 1795 and baptised at Shebbear parish church on 17th November.He was the son of John Thorne, a farmer, and Mary Ley, daughter of a farmer in the neighbouring parish of Bradford. He had his elementary education at a fee-paying private school at Langtree. He and his family moved to Lake in Shebbear parish about 1809. Here he came under the influence of Daniel Evans, the evangelical curate at Shebbear, who took up post in 1812. James was confirmed by the Bishop of Exeter at Great Torrington church on 10 August 1812.

After William O'Bryan, the Cornish evangelist, praught at Halsdon, Cookbury on 17 August 1815, he was invited to speak at Lake. After this sermon on 9 October 1815, he formed the Society of Bible Christians. Among its 22 initial members were John and Mary Thorne, with their five children.

James, who was known among his companions as "a lad o' pairts", rapidly acquired a position of pre-eminence among his associates. He almost immediately began preaching, and for four years continued to journey throughout the various parts of Devon. When he began preaching, the Bible Christians numbered twenty-two; after four years, they had become numerous in many parts of Devon. James, at the age of 20, preached for the first time at the 6 a.m. prayer meeting on Christmas Day, 1815 at Lake.

He was appointed a local preacher at the first Bible Christian Quarterly meeting a week later at O'Bryan's temporary home in Holsworthy and filled O'Bryan's preaching appointments during February 1816, while O'Bryan and his own brother, Samuel, visited Morwenstow. At the first Bible Christian local preachers' meeting on 4 March 1816 he was appointed the denomination's first full-time itinerant preacher.

Over the next three years he preached in many places in Devon and Cornwall, often in the open air to hostile audiences. He had the practice of walking to most of his preaching appointments, which continued throughout his life, often enormous distances. These included from on one occasion Shebbear to Exeter and on another, Shebbear to Plymouth.

In 1818 he assisted O'Bryan in drafting the "Rules of Society" for the denomination. In August 1819 he acted at Secretary of the first Bible Christian Conference at Baddash, O'Bryan's home near Launceston.

On 7 February 1820, Thorne set out with William Lyle to evangelise North Kent, where he aided in founding several congregations of "Arminian Bible Christians" over the next two years. In 1824 he was sent to London, where he placed the congregation in a prosperous condition, and in 1825, he revisited Kent as a missionary. In 1821 he was appointed committee member of the Preachers Fund (small pensions to "worn out" preachers) and the Missionary Society, formed to promote home missions.

From 1817 onward, Thorne founded chapels for his co-religionists in both Devon and Kent. The first chapel was finished at Shebbear in 1818, and three more were built by his exertions in Kent by 1821. From 1827 to 1829, he was superintendent preacher of the Shebbear circuit, from 1830 to 1831, he filled the same office in Kilkhampton, and in 1831, he presided over the general conference of Bible Christians.

In 1822 he purchased a printing press for the denomination in London and transported it to Stoke Damarel, Plymouth where Samuel Thorne became the denomination's printer.

From this time until 1844, Thorne was chiefly occupied in journeying through Southern England, organising the society, and forming local congregations in various districts.

On 23 September 1823, he married Catherine Reed of Holwell, at Shoreditch parish church, with whom he had six children.

After William O'Bryan's resignation in September 1828, Thorne assumed the role of editor of the Bible Christian Magazine, continuing in that office until 1866, when he was succeeded by F. W. Bourne.

In 1844, he settled at Shebbear, and confined himself more to local work, though still undertaking frequent mission tours. In 1870, failing health compelled him to relinquish his "connexional duties" and to restrict himself to preaching. He removed to Plymouth, where he died on 28 January 1872, and was buried at Shebbear.

== Notes and references ==
This article incorporates text from a publication now in the public domain: "Thorne, James (1795-1872)". Dictionary of National Biography. London: Smith, Elder & Co. 1885–1900.

=== Sources ===
- Carlyle, Edward Irving (1885). "Thorne, James (1795-1872)". Dictionary of National Biography, 1885-1900. Vol. 56. London: Smith, Elder & Co. pp. 292–293.
