= Benjamin Carvosso =

Australian Wesleyan minister

Benjamin Carvosso (29 September 1789 – 2 October 1854) was the first Wesleyan Minister to preach in Australia in 1820. He built/started the Hobart Wesleyan Church (in Hobart, Tasmania, which is an exact replica of the church in Mousehole, Penzance, Cornwall (except that it is larger in size). The church still owns a clock that he left as a present on his departure.

Carvosso was son of William Carvosso, born near Mousehole, in Mount's Bay, on 11 March 1750, first a fisherman, then a farmer, and afterwards for sixty years a most active class leader and local preacher in the Wesleyan Methodist connection, who died at Dowstal, in the parish of Mylor, on 13 Oct. 1834. The son was born in Gluvias parish, Cornwall, on 29 September 1789, and, although brought up by very pious parents, was not converted until his twenty-second year.

He was admitted as a probationer by the Wesleyan conference in 1814, and, after labouring for five years as a minister in England, offered himself as a missionary. He arrived in Van Diemen's Land in 1820, being the second minister of the Wesleyan denomination sent to the Australian colonies, and on 18 Aug. introduced Methodism into that island by a public service in Hobart Town. It was not long before he proceeded to New South Wales, where, in the towns of Windsor, Sydney, and Parramatta, he passed the next five years of his ministration.

He had a high sense of the importance of the press as a means of promoting religion, and in conjunction with his brethren commenced in 1820 the publication of the ‘Australian Magazine,’ the first of its class seen in the colony. In 1825 he removed to Hobart Town; here his labours were arduous; in the pulpit, the prison, the prayer meeting, the class meeting, and the family, he was constantly engaged. Returning to his native land in 1830 he continued in the full discharge of his ministerial duties in various parts of England throughout the remainder of his life.

He died at Tuckingmill, Cornwall, on 2 October 1854.

== Works ==
- The Great Efficacy of Simple Faith, a Memoir of William Carvosso 1835, many editions.
- Drunkenness the Enemy of Britain arrested by the Hand of God 1840
- An Account of Miss Deborah B. Carvosso 1840
- Attractive Piety, or Memorials of William B. Carvosso 1844, several editions.
