= Frederick Richards (judge) =

Sir Frederick William Richards
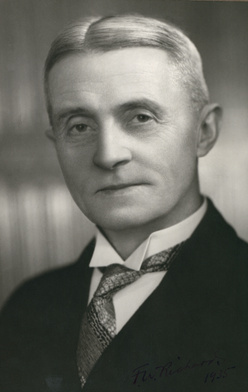

Personal details
- Profession: Judge

Sir Frederick William Richards (1869-1957), commonly known as F. W. Richards, was an Australian jurist. He served as a senior puisne Judge on the Supreme Court of South Australia until his retirement in December 1945, following a lengthy and illustrious career in public service. Richards had held the position of Justice on the court since 1927.

Born as the son of the Rev. William Richards, a longstanding resident of the State, Frederick Richards commenced his education in the public schools of South Australia. At the age of 14, he enrolled at Shebbear College in Devon, England, which was also attended by Sir Samuel Way and the Rev. J. Thome. In 1887 he matriculated at London University, achieving remarkable academic success and obtaining an LLB degree in 1894. A year later, he further distinguished himself by earning a Doctor of Law degree from the same university.

Returning to Australia, Frederick Richards spent four years as managing clerk, two in the office of Sir Josiah Symon, and with Messrs. C. C. Kingston and McLachlan. In 1901 he was appointed associate to Chief Justice, Sir Samuel Way.

In 1908 he received the appointment of Parliamentary Draftsman and Assistant Crown Solicitor, and in 1916 he was appointed Crown Solicitor. In 1921 he took silk, and in 1925 and 1926 was an acting judge of the Supreme Court of South Australia. He was appointed a Judge in 1927.

He was knighted in 1946.
