= Bible believer =

Bible believer (also Bible-believer, Bible-believing Christian, Bible-believing Church) is a self-description by conservative Christians to differentiate their teachings from others who they see as placing non-biblical or extra-biblical tradition as higher or equal in authority to the Bible.

In normal usage, "Bible believer" means an individual or organization that believes the Bible is true in some significant way. However, this combination of words is given a unique meaning in fundamentalist Protestant circles, where it is equated with the belief that the Christian Bible "contains no theological contradictions, historical discrepancies, or other such 'errors'", otherwise known as biblical inerrancy.

== See also ==
- Bible Christian Church
- Bible Christian Church (vegetarian)
- Bibliolatry
- Biblical literalism
- Christian fundamentalism
- Christian right
- Evangelicalism
