= Sam Pollard (missionary) =

British Methodist missionary to China

Samuel Pollard
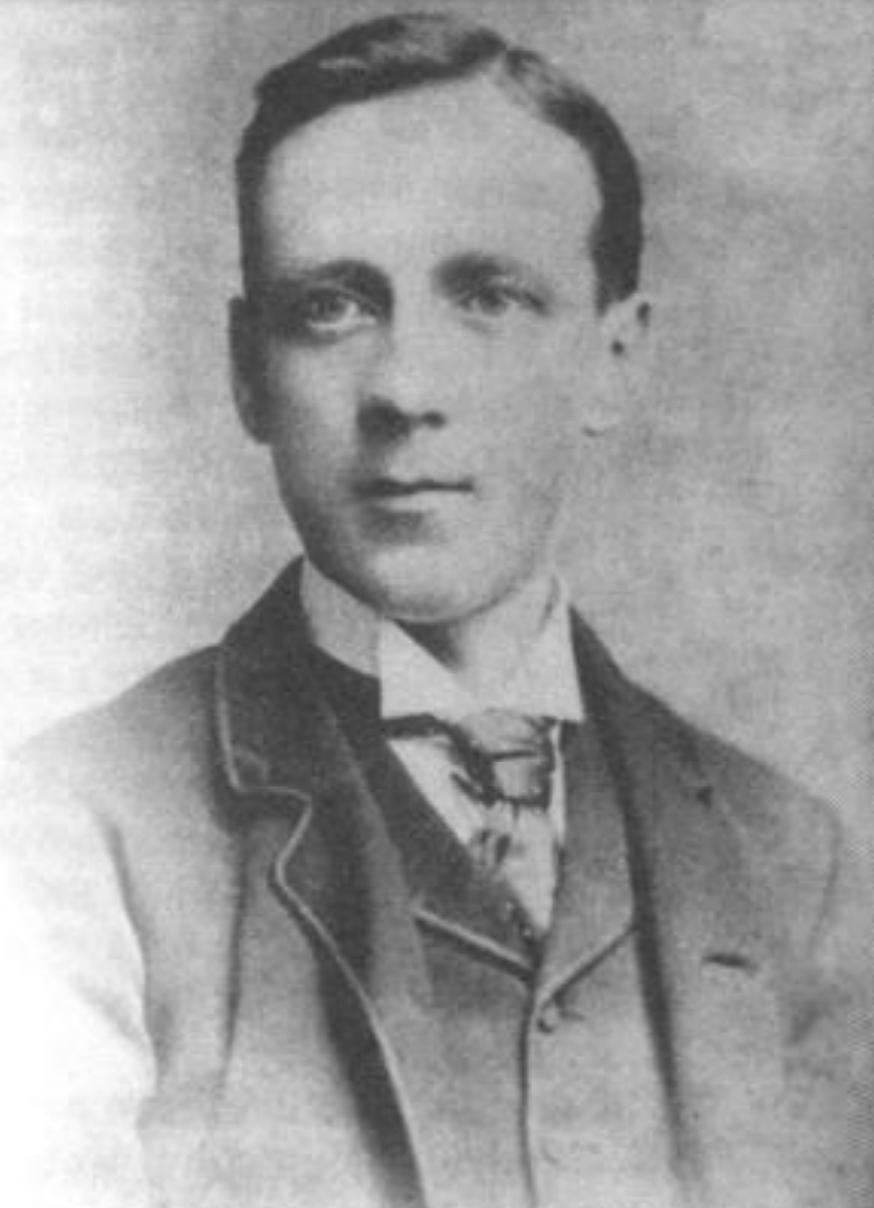
- Pollard on furlough
- Born: 20 April 1864; Camelford, Cornwall, England
- Died: 16 September 1915 (aged 51); Weining Yi, Hui, and Miao Autonomous County, Bijie, Guizhou, China
- Education: Shebbear College, Devon, England

Samuel Pollard (20 April 1864 in Camelford, Cornwall – 16 September 1915 in Weining, Guizhou), known in Chinese as Bo Geli (Chinese: 柏格理; pinyin: Bó Gélǐ) was a British Methodist missionary to China with the China Inland Mission who converted many of the A-Hmao (closely related to the Hmong) in Guizhou to Christianity, and who created a Miao script that is still in use today.

== Biography ==
Born the son of a Bible Christian Church preacher of Cornish extraction, Sam Pollard initially aimed for a career in the civil service. However, a conference in London in 1885 encouraged him to instead become a missionary. He was appointed a missionary in 1886, left the United Kingdom for China in 1887, and was posted to Yunnan province in 1888. He remained in China, as a missionary, until his death from typhoid.

In 1891 he was posted to a newly opened Bible Christian Mission station in Zhaotong (referred to in contemporary sources in Wade–Giles as Chaotung), where he married Emmie Hainge, a nurse missionary. He began a Christian movement with the A-Hmao (also known as the Big Flowery Miao) in 1905 that spread to Zhaotong. Pollard also invented a script for the Miao languages called the Pollard Script (also sometimes called the "Ahmao script"). He credited the basic idea of the script to the Cree syllabary, "While working out the problem, we remembered the case of the syllabics used by James Evans, a Methodist missionary among the Indians of North America, and resolved to do as he had done". He also gave credit to a non-Miao Chinese pastor, "Stephen Lee assisted me very ably in this matter, and at last we arrived at a system".

Pollard never claimed any divine inspiration or vision in creating the script. Rather, he left a record of hard work, advice from others, and ideas from other scripts. At the beginning, he wrote, he "made an experiment in getting out a written language for the Miao", even writing out some symbols in his diary.

Pollard wrote that "Mr. Stephen Lee and I are attempting to reduce the Miao language to a simply system of writing. The attempt may succeed or it may end… stillborn". He asked himself in his diary "How shall I manage to distinguish tones?" then later wrote how he had found the solution, adopting an idea from Pitman shorthand. In listing the phrases he used to describe the process of creating the script, there is clear indication of work, not revelation: "we looked about", "working out the problem", "resolved to attempt", "assisted", "at last we arrived at a system", "adapting the system", "we found", "solved our problem". In all of this, we see no hint of specific revelation or any vision, only intellectual labor.

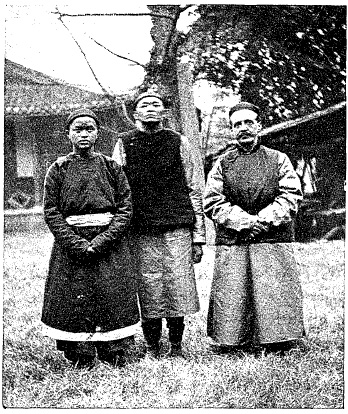
Pollard and Miao teachers

He used it to translate the New Testament. The script was unique in the fact that it used the initial consonant of a syllable, with the vowel placed above or below it, in order to indicate which tone the vowel was.

Pollard received pressure from some British sources that if the Roman script was not suitable, he should consider using the Burmese alphabet. He did not accept this suggestions, but Pollard did leave the door open for switching over to Roman letters, writing in 1906, "It is quite possible later on to turn our system into Romanised, where there is a successful Romanised system in use which will solve the tone difficulty". A large part of Pollard's motivation for creating his script was to have a way to adequately mark the sounds of the language, especially the tones. It has remained in use for 90 years, despite efforts to supersede it.

During his mission he travelled extensively, founding churches, training other missionaries, performing the role of language examiner, and arguing the causes of Miao Christians. He also fought against the oppression of the Miao, this often led to clashes with Chinese officials. He was nearly beaten to death at the orders of a greedy landlord.

== Death ==
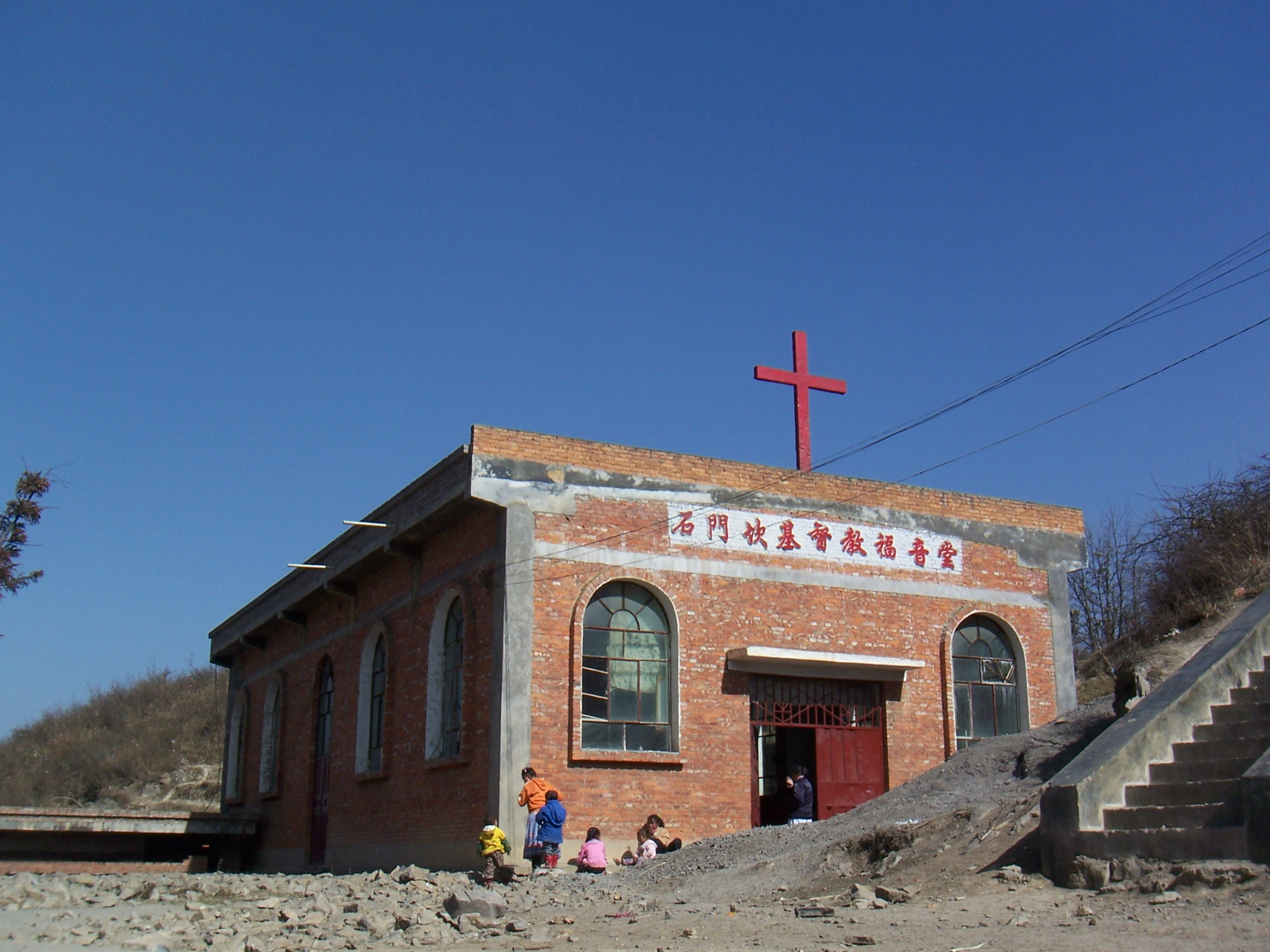
Protestant Gospel Church at Shimenkan

After Pollard's death in 1915, he was buried in the mountains near the Shimenkan mission station, located in the area now known as Weining Yi, Hui, and Miao Autonomous County. The mission prospered for another 35 years until 1950, when the CCP ordered all English missionaries to cease proselytizing and leave the country. His grave and the county were closed to foreigners until 1995, when Xinhua announced that work had been taken to restore Pollard's tomb which they now declared to be a national monument.

== Dedications ==
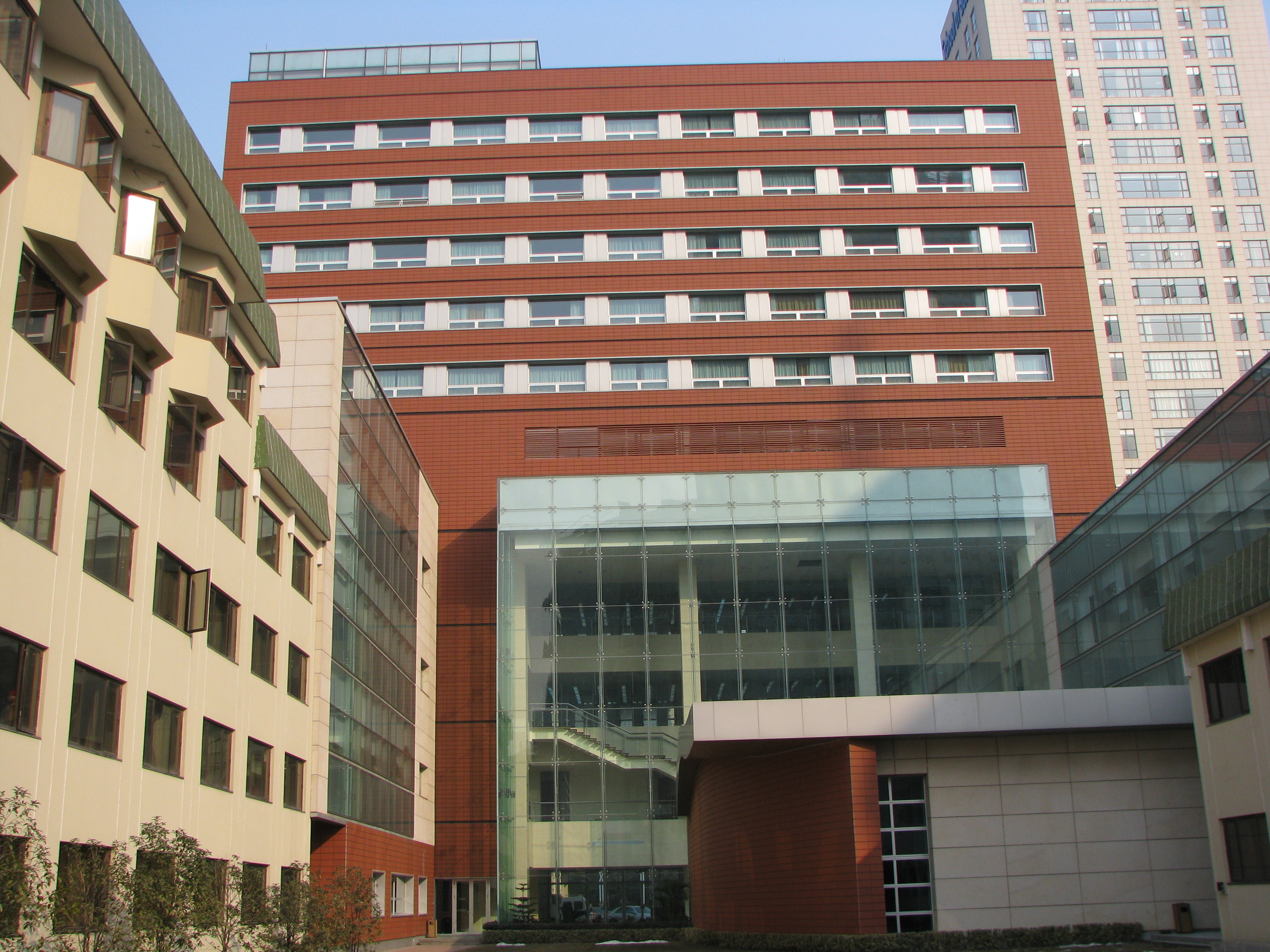
Samuel Pollard Building

The 100,000-square-foot (9,300 m^{2}) main building at the Hopkins-Nanjing Center in Nanjing, China, is known as the Samuel Pollard Building. It houses the center's library, classrooms and conference space, and administration offices.

The building was dedicated in 2007 as part of the center's twentieth anniversary celebrations, which included keynotes by former Secretary of State Henry Kissinger and former Chinese Foreign Minister Qian Qichen.

== Bibliography ==
- Pollard, Sam; Smith, Henry; Dymond, F J (1909). "The Story of the Miao". United Methodist Magazine. republished posthumously as:
  - Pollard, Sam; Smith, Henry; Dymond, F J (1919). The Story of the Miao. London: Henry Hooks.
- Pollard, Sam (1913). Tight Corners in China.
- Pollard, Sam (1921). In Unknown China: observations, adventures and experiences of a pioneer missionary.
- Pollard, Sam (1954). R Elliott Kendall (ed.). Eyes of the Earth: the diary of Samuel Pollard. London, Cargate Press.

== See also ==
- Christianity in Cornwall
- Christianity in Guizhou
- List of China Inland Mission missionaries in China
