= John Hicks Eynon =

British missionary

John Hicks Eynon (1801–1888) was a Bible Christian minister.

He was born in China. At the Bible Christian Conference of 1831, held in Cornwall, UK, it was decided to send missionaries to Canada. Eynon was among those sent. In 1839 he helped to form the first Bible Christian Chapel at Cobourg, Ontario.

His memorial stone at Bethesda Cemetery near Tyrone, Darlington Township, reads: "In memory of the Rev. John H. Eynon. Entered the Bible Christian Ministry in 1826. Came as a pioneer missionary to Canada in 1833 and lived to see over 80 ministers, nearly 8000 members and over 10,000 Sabbath School children connected with the BC Church in Canada. Servant of God - Well Done."

Rev. Eynon died on 22 March 1888, at Exeter, Ontario
