= William Carvosso =

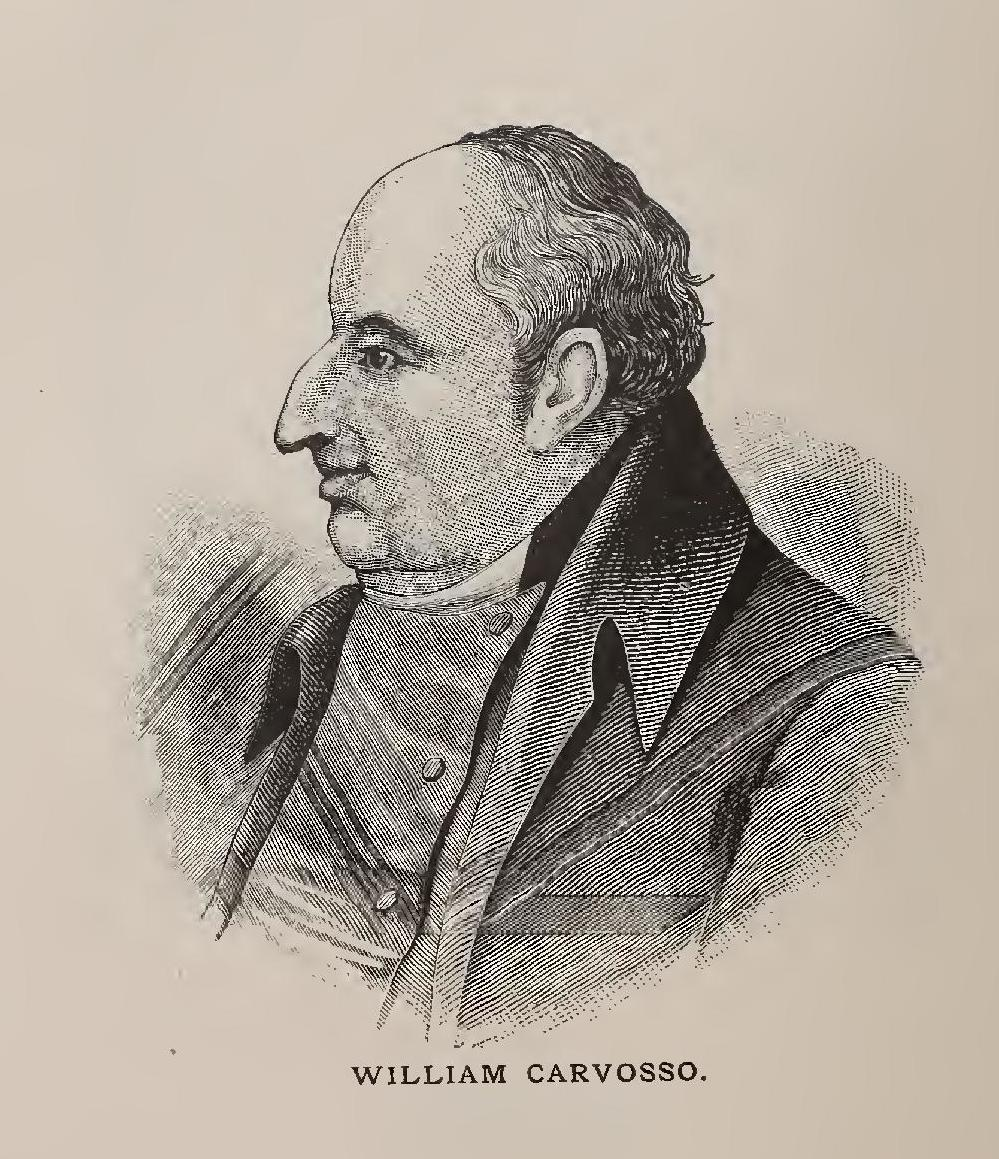
Centenary cameos : 1784–1884 by Fitzgerald, O. P. (Oscar Penn), 1829-1911 Publication date 1885

William Carvosso (1750–1834) was an early Wesleyan leader in Cornwall, England. He was converted to Christianity at age 21 and went on to become a Class Leader in the Wesleyan Connexion and a prominent figure of the church. Towards the end of his life he roamed all over Cornwall preaching. He learned to write after he was 65 and wrote a famous memoir, edited by his son Benjamin Carvosso, filled with his journal and letters.

His grandson Robert Rundle was a notable missionary in Western Canada.

== Writings ==
- William Carvosso: A Memoir, Harvey Christian Publishers (1996) - see details here
