= Paul Robins =

Paul Robins (6 September 1804, in Kenwyn, Cornwall, United Kingdom – 27 April 1890, Bowmanville, Ontario) was a Cornish Bible Christian. He was a pioneer of the Bible Christian movement in North America having sailed from Cornwall in 1846. He settled in Bowmanville at some point prior to 1853. He continued living there until his death.

== Early life ==
His parents were Paul Moyle Robins, a tin mine manager and Agnes Rule. In the spring of 1819 he was converted to the Bible Christian church by Ann Cory. In 1823 he filled a vacancy as a minister in the Ringsash circuit, and against his father's wishes decided on a life as a BC minister. His brother Matthew Robins would also later become a BC minister.

== Marriage ==
On 5 September 1831 in Brighton, Sussex, he married Ann Vickery, another Bible Christian itinerant minister. They had two children: Sampson Paul Robins, born on 27 January 1833 in Faversham, Kent, and Samuel Frederick Vickery Robins, born on 6 January 1836 in Kings Brompton, Somerset. Sampson became a Bible Christian minister for one year, before changing to the teaching profession.

== North America ==
On 16 January 1846 it was decided to send three additional ministers to North America: one to Wisconsin, one to Ohio and an additional minister for Upper Canada. Paul Robins, along with William Hooper and Henry Ebbett, were selected to travel to North America. Paul Robins and family, William and Rebecca Hooper, and Henry Ebbett all traveled together aboard the Voluna. A copy of Paul Robins's journal of the trip has been passed down in the family.

After a number of years working on various circuits, he was moved to Bowmanville where he established the Book Room. His wife Ann died there in 1853.

In 1854 he was one of the Canadian ministers sent back to England to help negotiate the creation of the separate Canadian conference.

== Death ==
He died in Bowmanville, Ontario, on 27 April 1890 and was buried in Providence Cemetery.
