= United Methodist Church (Great Britain) =

Former religious denomination in Great Britain

The United Methodist Church in Great Britain was a Protestant denomination which operated from 1907 to 1932. It was a relatively small grouping of British Methodism, formed in 1907 by the union of the United Methodist Free Churches with two other small groupings, the Bible Christian Church and the Methodist New Connexion.

== Formation ==
United Methodist Church Act 1907
- Act of Parliament
- Parliament of the United Kingdom
- Long title: An Act to authorise the union of the Methodist New Connexion the Bible Christians and the United Methodist Free Churches under the name of "The United Methodist Church" to deal with real and personal property belonging to the said churches or denominations to provide for the vesting of the said property in trust for the United Church so formed and for the assimilation of the trusts thereof and for other purposes.
- Citation: 7 Edw. 7. c. lxxv

Dates
- Royal assent: 26 July 1907

Text of statute as originally enacted

The United Methodist Church Act 1907 (7 Edw. 7. c. lxxv), the act of Parliament which enabled this amalgamation, received royal assent on 26 July 1907, and authorised the union "to deal with real and personal property belonging to the said three churches or denominations, to provide for the vesting of the said property in trust for the United Church so formed and for the assimilation of the trusts thereof, and for other purposes". The union was completed on 16 September 1907 in Wesley's Chapel, City Road, London. The Church gave power of speech and vote in its meetings to every member of 18 years of age and upwards. Its principal courts were constituted of an equal number of ministers and laymen.

The Church had theological colleges at Manchester and Sheffield, boys' schools at Shebbear College, Devon and at Ashville College in Harrogate, and a girls' school, Edgehill College at Bideford. It issued a weekly and two monthly journals.

In the Methodist Union of 1932 the United Methodists merged with the Primitive Methodists and the Wesleyan Methodists to form a new church, known simply as the "Methodist Church".

The British United Methodist Church had no particular connection with the United Methodist Church in the United States, other than a common Methodist heritage; the American church did not take the title "United Methodist Church" until 1968.
