= Bible Christian Church =

Methodist denomination (1815–1907)

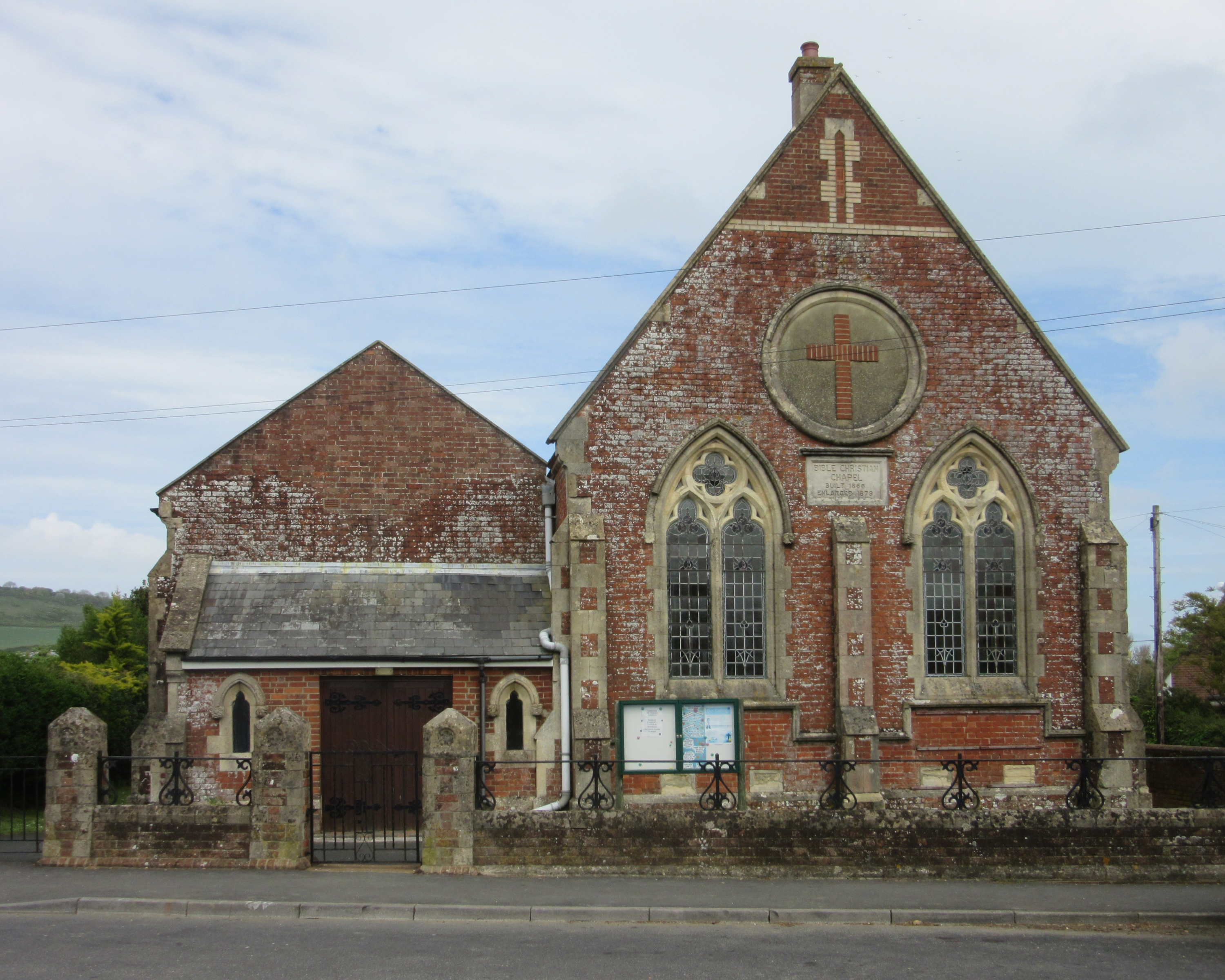
- Arreton Methodist Church on the Isle of Wight (originally a Bible Christian church)
- Classification: Methodist
- Scripture: Bible
- Founder: William O'Bryan
- Origin: 18 October 1815; Shebbear, Devon
- Merged into: United Methodist Free Churches and Methodist New Connexion to form United Methodist Church in England; Methodist Church in Canada; Methodist Church in Australia
- Defunct: 1907

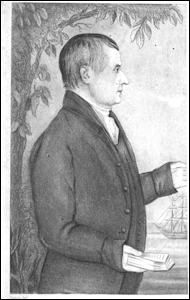
William O'Bryan

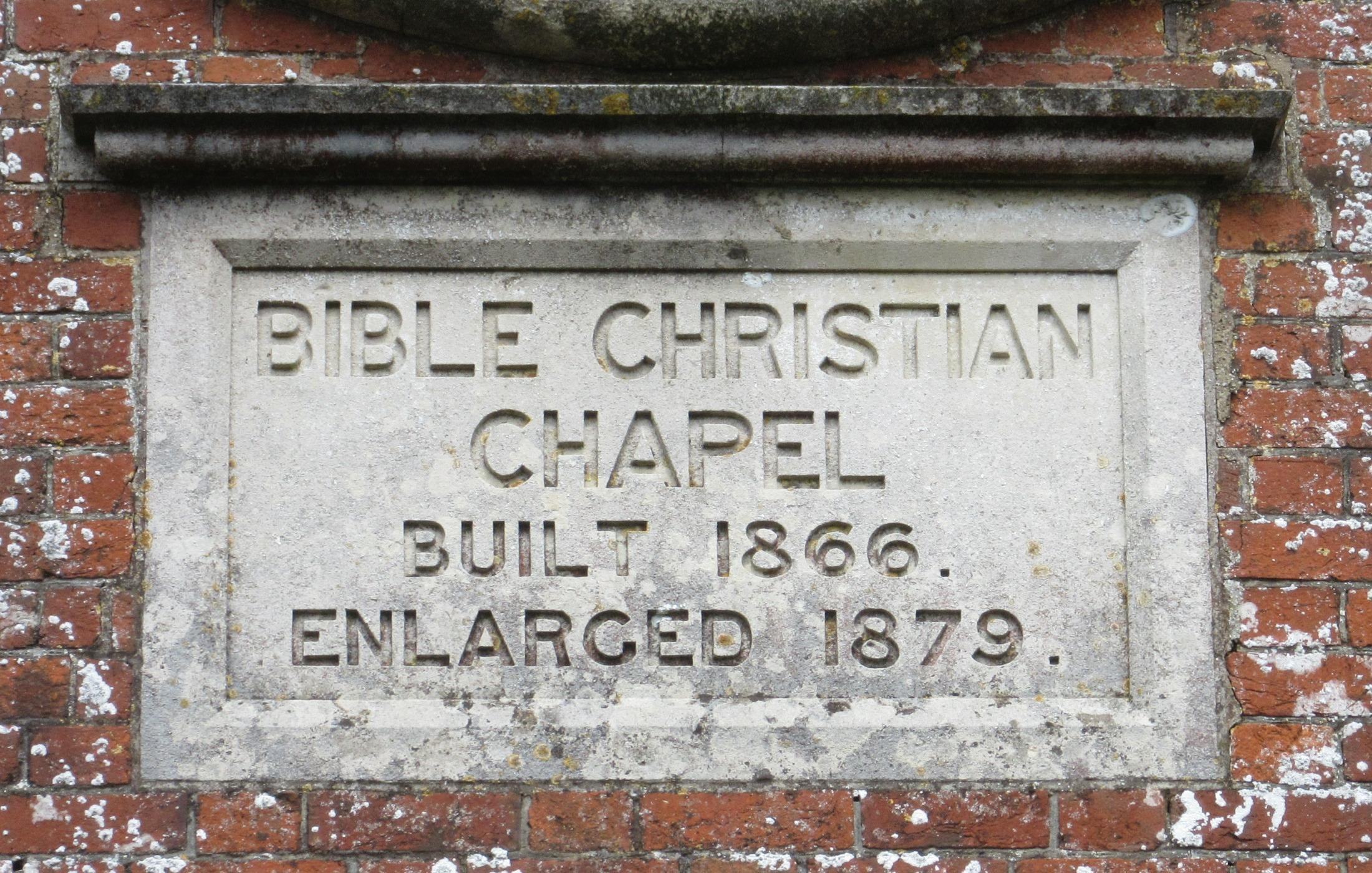
This foundation stone at Arreton is inscribed bible christian chapel.

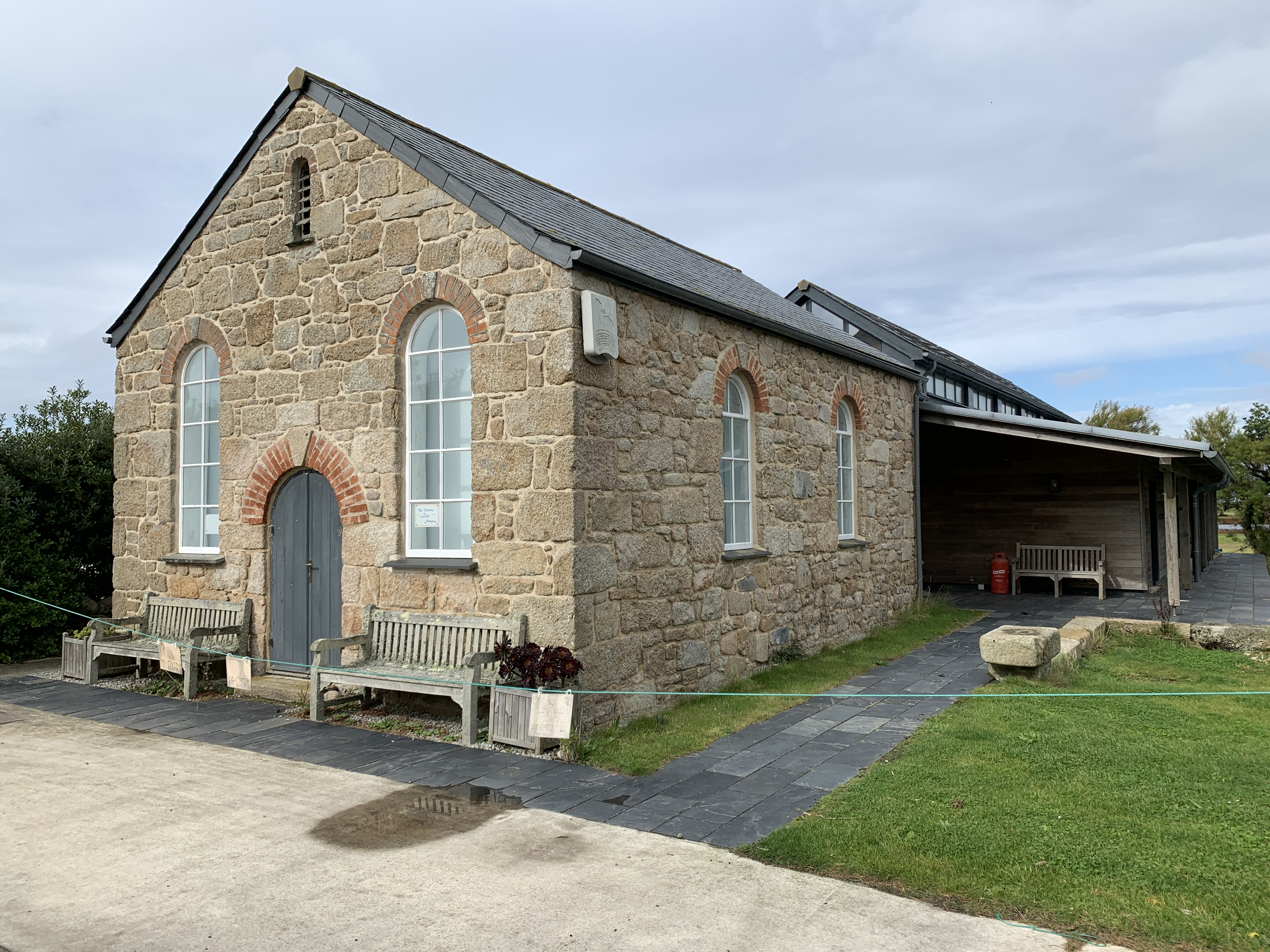
Bible Christian Chapel, St Agnes, Isles of Scilly erected in 1874

The Bible Christian Church was a Methodist denomination founded by William O'Bryan (born Bryant), a Wesleyan Methodist local preacher, on 18 October 1815 in North Cornwall. The first society, consisting of just 22 members, met at Lake Farm in Shebbear, Devon. Members of the Church were sometimes known as Bryanites, after their founder.

Although founded by O'Bryan, the family Thorne came to dominate the movement as the same autocratic behaviour by Bryant that led to his separation from the Weslyan Methodists also led to him losing the leadership of the Bible Christians to James Thorne. William Bryant was its first superintendent until 1828 when, following internal strife, he was replaced by William Mason, with James Thorne as Secretary. The name was changed to the popular Bible Christians. O'Bryan left in 1832 for America where he continued to preach but no further church was founded.

== Early history ==
Primarily concentrated in Cornwall and Devon, the church sent missionaries all over England. By 1820, missions had been established in the Channel Islands and in Kent. They were also strong in the Isle of Wight amongst farm labourers, largely due to the inspirational teachings of Mary Toms of Tintagel, Cornwall. The vicar of Brighstone from 1830, Samuel Wilberforce, urged that their influence be countered by having their adherents sacked from their jobs and turned out from their cottages, resulting in their sometimes meeting in a chalk pit. There are several chapels in rural areas of the Island which have the title "Bible Christian Chapel" over the doorway (e.g. Apse Heath, Arreton).

By 1831, ministers were being sent to Prince Edward Island and Ontario, and a mission was established in Canada in 1845. Many of the emigrants from Devon and Cornwall to Canada and the United States in the 1830s were 'Bible Christians', further encouraging the spread of the church in those countries.

Australia was a favourite destination for missionaries by 1850.

Other missionaries worked in New Zealand by 1878, and in China by 1885.

Members of the Bible Christian Church were sometimes known as Bryanites, after their founder. The church made extensive use of female preachers like Ann Freeman, and O'Bryan's wife Catherine.

== Later history ==
While being only a small denomination, the Bible Christians grew faster than the British population throughout their existence.

The Bible Christians recognised the ministry of women, calling them "Female Special Agents". A number of women appear on the stations – the places ministers were appointed to by the Bible Christian Conference. There were fewer than five of these women ministers in 1907, when the separate existence of the Bible Christians came to an end.

In 1907, the Bible Christian Church in England was amalgamated with the United Methodist Free Churches and the Methodist New Connexion, to form the United Methodist Church. In Canada, the Bible Christian Church had already been amalgamated, in 1884, into the Methodist Church of Canada, which later became part of the United Church of Canada. In Australia, it merged into the Methodist Church of Australasia on 1 January 1902.

== See also ==
- Bible Christian Mission
- Penrose Methodist Chapel
- Shebbear College
- Sam Pollard — Bible Christian missionary to China
- Paul Robins — Bible Christian missionary to Canada
- John Hicks Eynon — Bible Christian missionary to Canada
- Billy Bray
- James Way – Bible Christian missionary to Australia
- Serena Lake – Bible Christian missionary to Australia
- Ann Freeman
