= William O'Bryan =

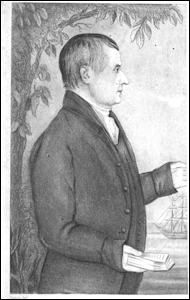
William O'Bryan

William O'Bryan (6 February 1778 – 8 January 1868) was a Methodist preacher and founder of the Bible Christian movement.

== Life ==
O'Bryan was born William Bryant at Gunwen farm, Luxulyan, Cornwall. He converted to Wesleyan Methodism.

In 1815 he changed his surname to O'Bryan, wishing to assert his presumed Irish ancestry. On 18 October 1815 he founded, with 22 members, the Bible Christian sect that was later known as "Bryanites".

Following his split from the Wesleyans in 1815 his family moved from Kilkhampton to Badash Farm, Launceston, Cornwall, where the Bible Christians held their first two conferences. The farm is now a listed building for its unusually well preserved set of 18th-century buildings set amidst open farmland.

The first Bible Christian chapel was built in Shebbear, Devon in 1817. His movement spread mainly through North Cornwall, including Padstow, Bude and Launcells. O'Bryan left the group in 1832 after a dispute over church administration, and became an itinerant preacher in the US, between 1831 and 1862 crossing the Atlantic 13 times, but failed to establish a church. The Bryanite sect merged into the United Methodist Church in 1907.

== Family ==
He married Catherine Cowlin on 9 July 1803; they had two sons and six daughters.
