= Orchidaceae of Mexico and Guatemala =

Book on orchids

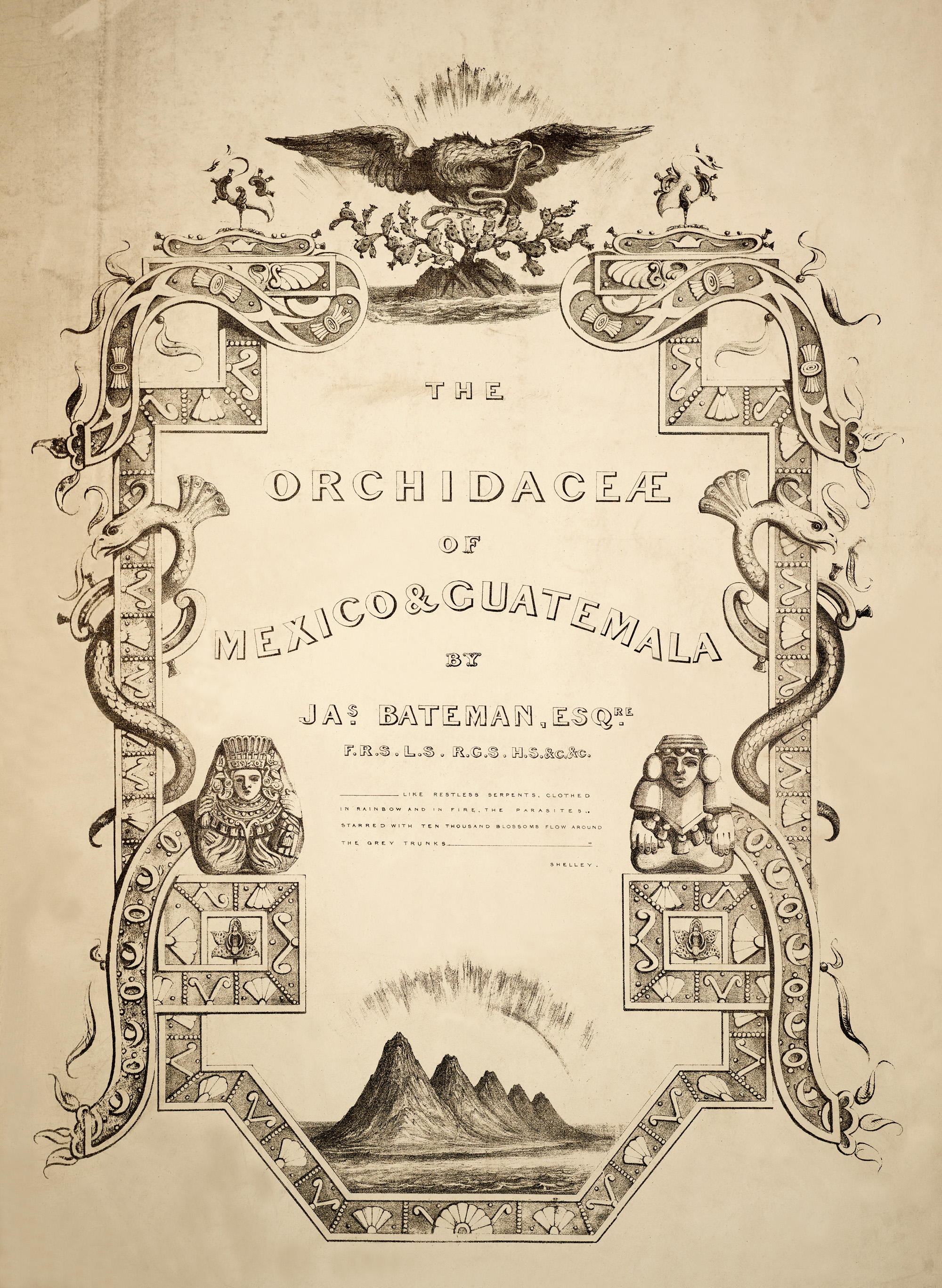
Title page of the first edition, 1837-1843

Orchidaceae of Mexico and Guatemala is a rare privately-published book with 40 extremely large hand-coloured lithographic plate illustrations of orchids. It was sold only by subscription, in instalments between 1837 and 1843. The print run was of only 125 copies, which were priced at 20 guineas. instalments between 1837 and 1843 by the London bookseller Sampson Low. The instalments were then sometimes bound into a single large volume. The book weighed 37 pounds (17 kg), and measured 3 feet (0.91 m) wide by 4 feet (1.2 m) high. The botanical artist Wilfrid Blunt described it as the finest and largest botany book ever illustrated in this way. The lithographs were made by Maxim Gauci. A copy sold for $75,000 at auction in 2013.

== Author ==
James Bateman (1811–1897) was a British horticulturist and author of books on orchids. He created the gardens of his country house Biddulph Grange, and built the Geological Gallery there to illustrate his creationist view of geology.

Doris M. Reed, curator of manuscripts at Indiana University, describes Bateman as the most enthusiastic collector and cultivator of orchids in England. While he was still studying at the University of Oxford, he arranged for a nurseryman, Mr Colley, to travel to British Guiana in 1833 to collect orchids for him. Colley managed to send back specimens of 60 species alive, some 20 of which had never before been seen in England; even this left Bateman disappointed. The following year, he wrote to G. Ure Skinner, a merchant and landowner in Guatemala, asking if he could help him find orchids there. Skinner went on to help Bateman to obtain orchids for the next decade.

== Book ==
=== Synopsis ===
"Tab. XV. Epidendrum alatum: Winged Epidendrum" (later named Encyclia alata)

Orchidaceae of Mexico and Guatemala is a large-format book of 131 pages devoted to the orchids discovered in Guatemala and Mexico.

The book begins with a title page, a dedication to Queen Adelaide, a one-page preface, a mainly blank page with a monochrome illustration of a wreath visited by butterflies, a list of subscribers, and an index to the colour plates.

This is followed by a chapter of Bateman's "Introductory Remarks" on the Orchidaceae, and a chapter "On the Culture of Tropical Orchidaceae", giving advice on how to grow and care for tropical orchids, several of them epiphytic (growing on trees). A table lists the hundred "Best Orchidaceae Cultivated (Ann. 1843) in British Collections". A two-page "Synopsis" lists all the orchid species that had been discovered in Mexico and Guatemala up to 1843.

The body of the book consists of 40 colour plates, each one of a single species of orchid, with its accompanying text, generally of one or two pages. Each plate is a hand-coloured lithograph. The plates are accompanied by a textual description of the species concerned, with a title in Latin and English; a brief description in Latin; and a longer description in English of the species's leaves and flower parts. This is followed by a brief account of the discovery of the species and of its growth habit. There is often a monochrome tail-piece illustration at the end of each species's descriptive text; this is sometimes of a scene in the region where the orchids were found, accompanied by a short description in the text and a caption such as a quoted line from a poem.

The book ends with a single-page list of Addenda et Corrigenda (additions and corrections).

=== Publication ===
The drawings from which the colour illustrations were made were by botanical artists, principally Augusta Innes Withers (c.1793-1864), who made 21 of them, and Sarah Anne Drake (1803-1857), who made 16. The lithographic engravings were made by Maxim Gauci from their drawings. They made the drawings using notes made by Bateman's collectors in the field and from observing the orchids that had been sent back to England. Some of the specimens did not bloom even years after arrival, and some, such as Artorima erubescens, failed to arrive; in these cases the artists worked from dried herbarium specimens.

Orchidaceae of Mexico and Guatemala was printed for Bateman in instalments between 1837 and 1843 by the London bookseller Sampson Low. The instalments were then sometimes bound into a single large volume. The book was too heavy for one person to carry, and measured 3 feet (0.91 m) wide by 4 feet (1.2 m) high. The orchids were depicted in bloom, life size, in the exceptionally large 27 inches (69 cm) × 15 inches (38 cm) illustrations. The book weighed over 17 kilograms (37 lb). It had a subscription-only print run of 125 copies and was priced at 20 guineas. (Note: This would be worth over £3,000 in 2026.)

Some of the illustrations in the book

Index to the 40 lithographic plates

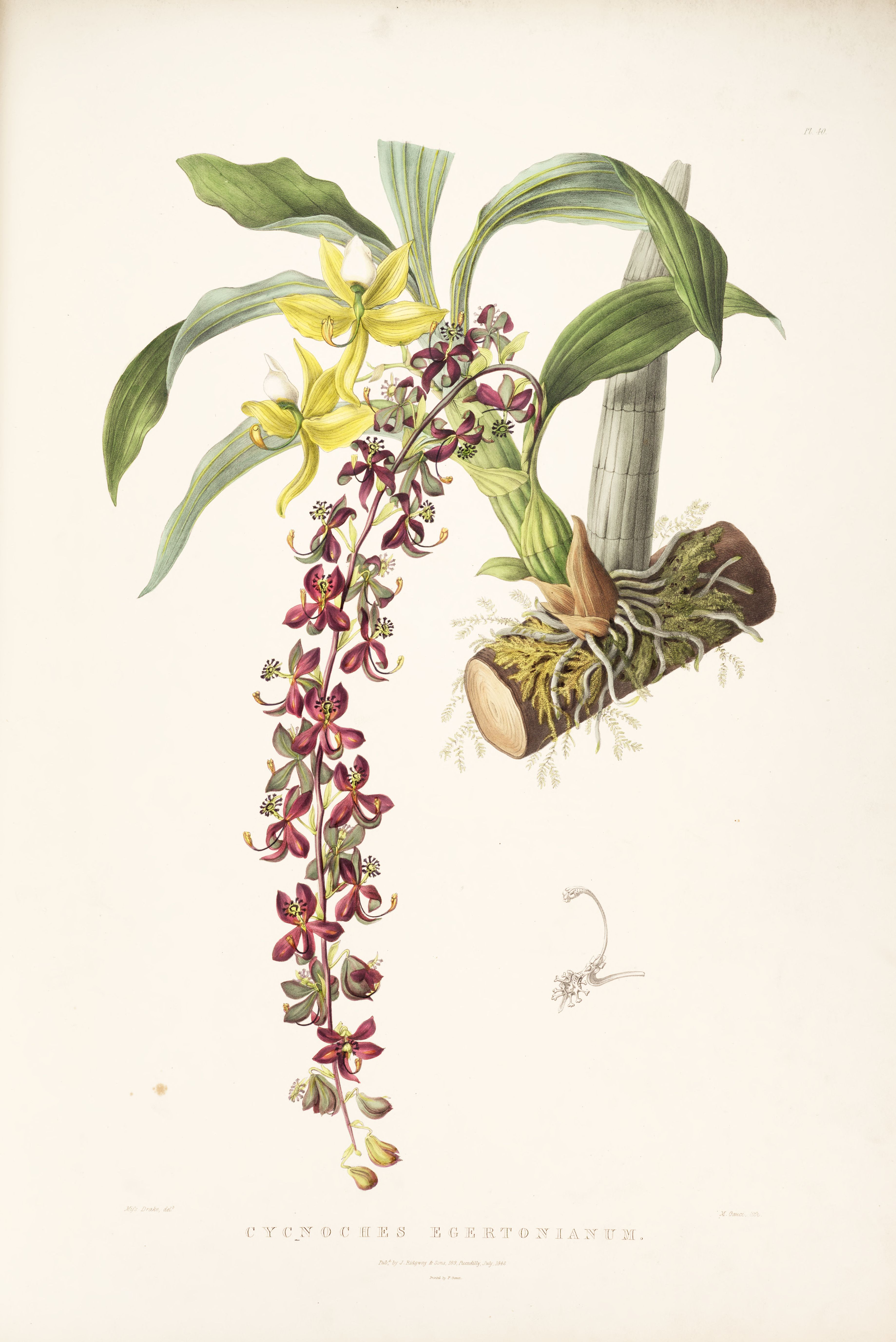
Drawing of Cycnoches egertonianum, an epiphytic orchid

Rossioglossum grande

Guarianthe skinneri

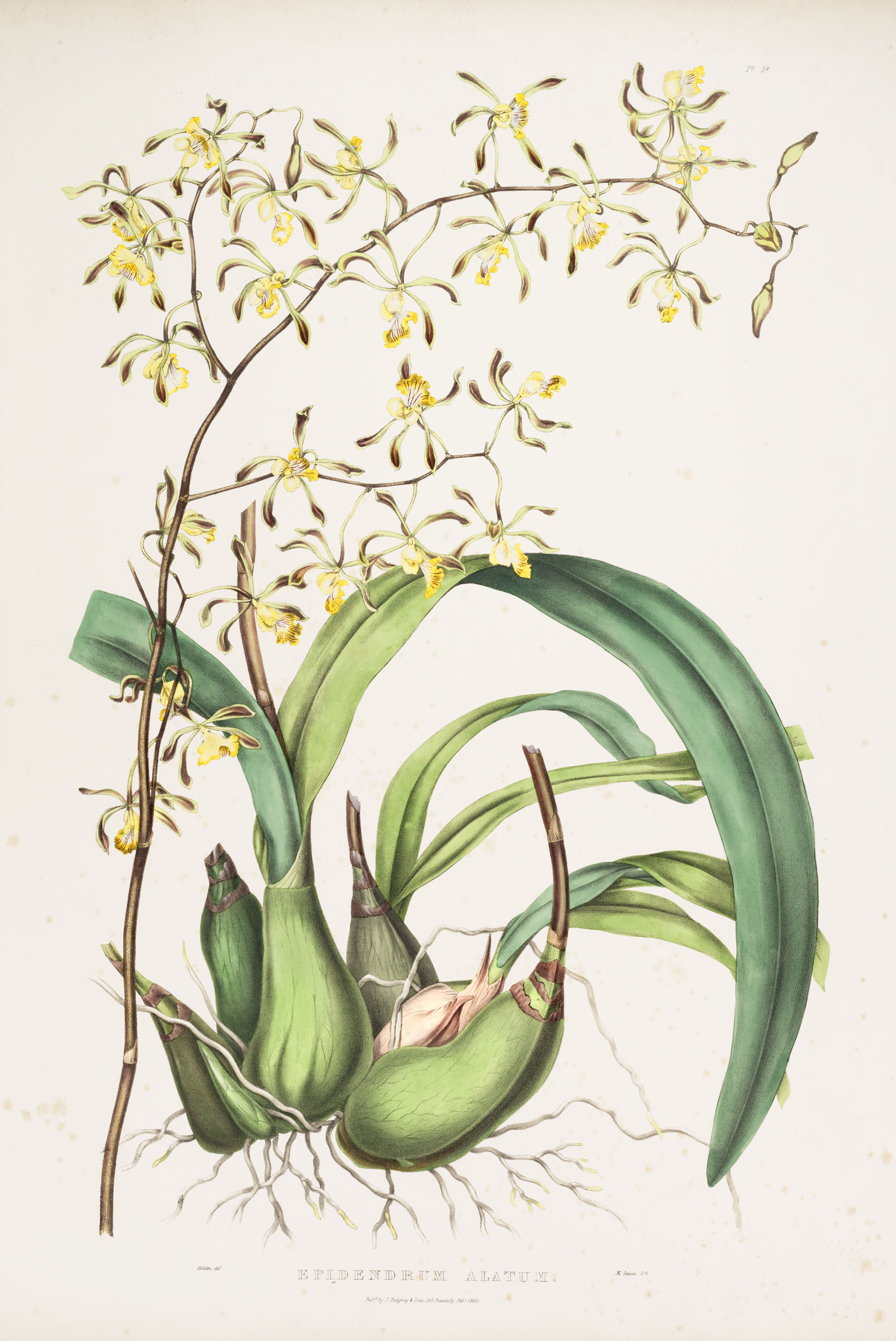
Encyclia alata

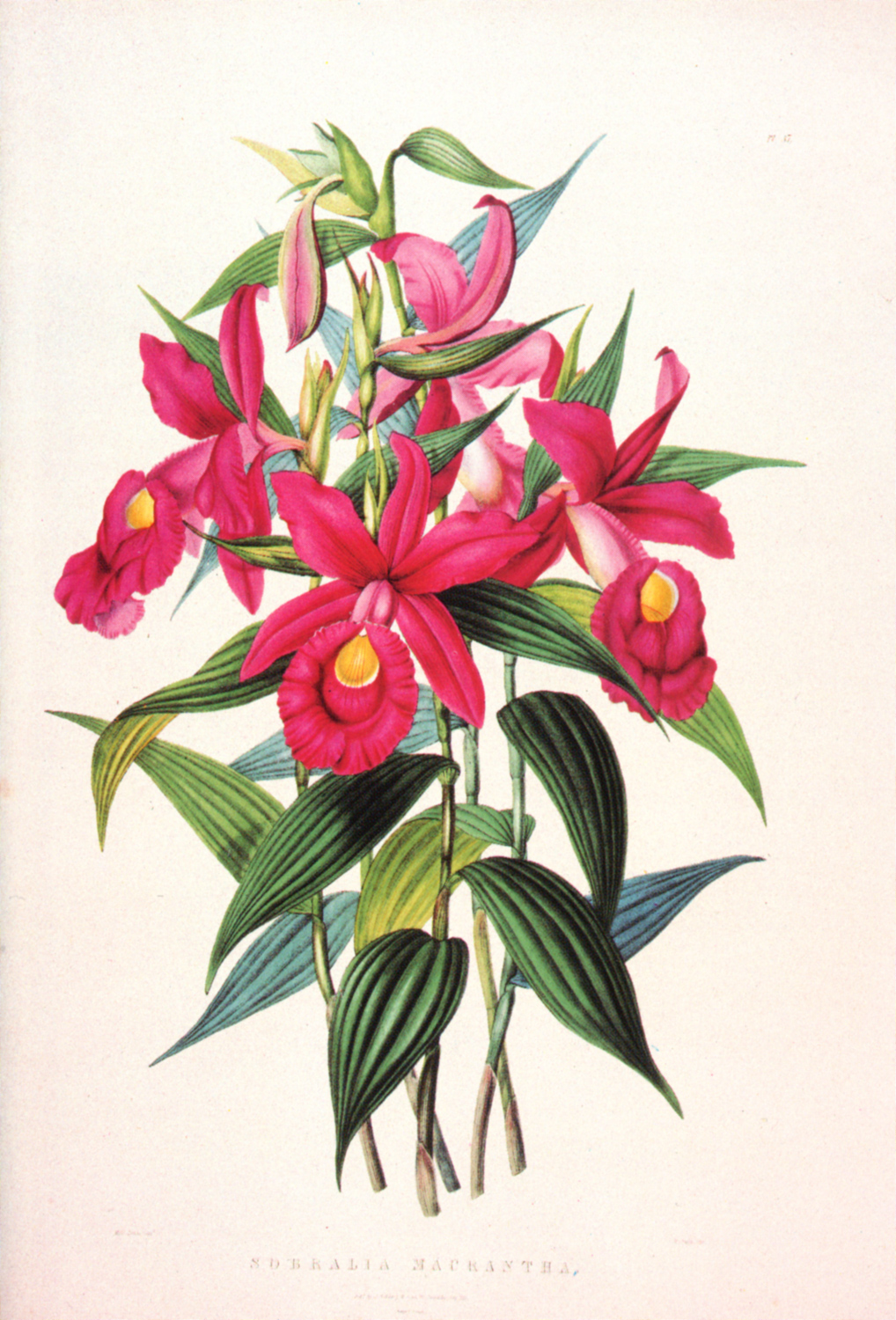
Sobralia macrantha

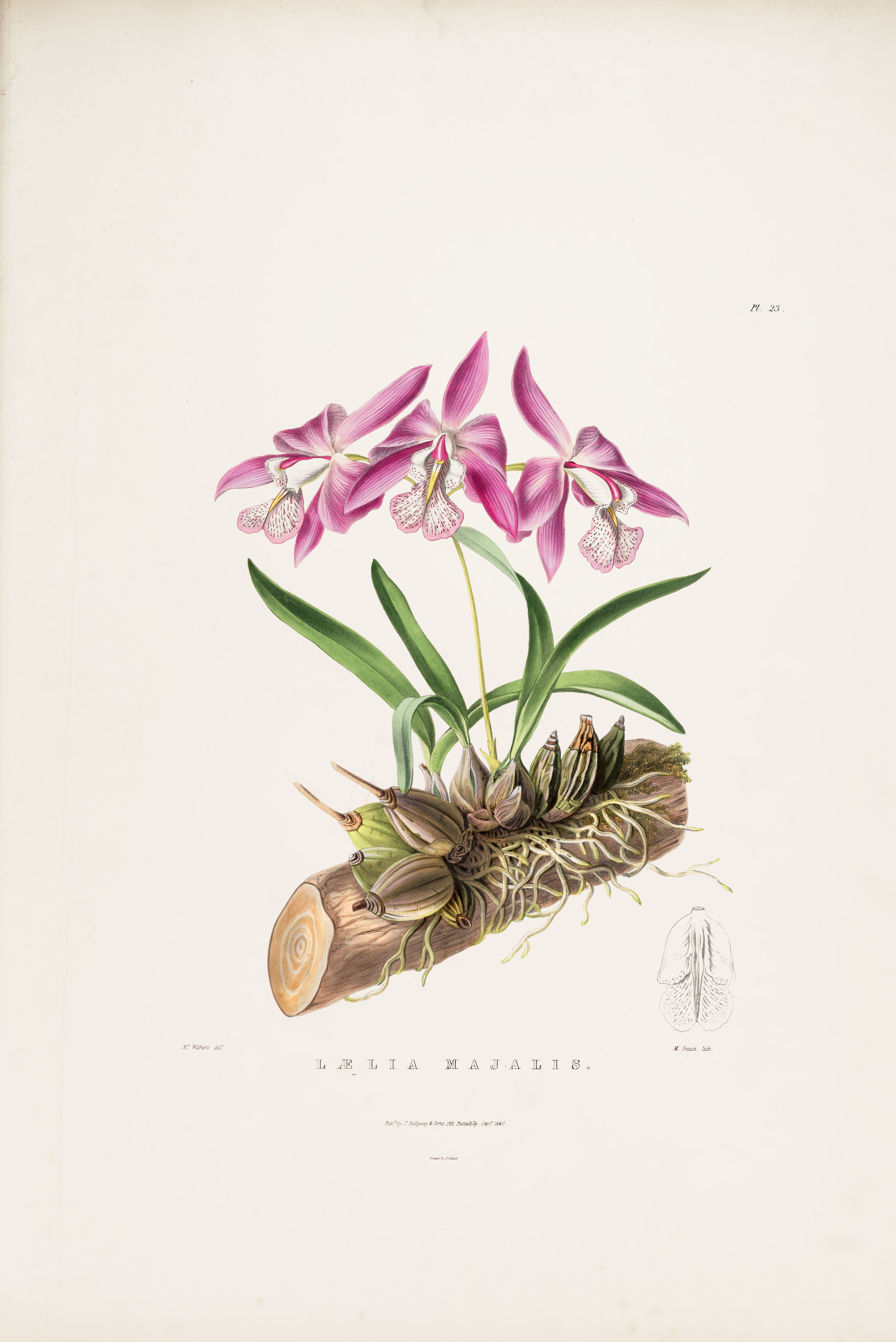
Laelia speciosa

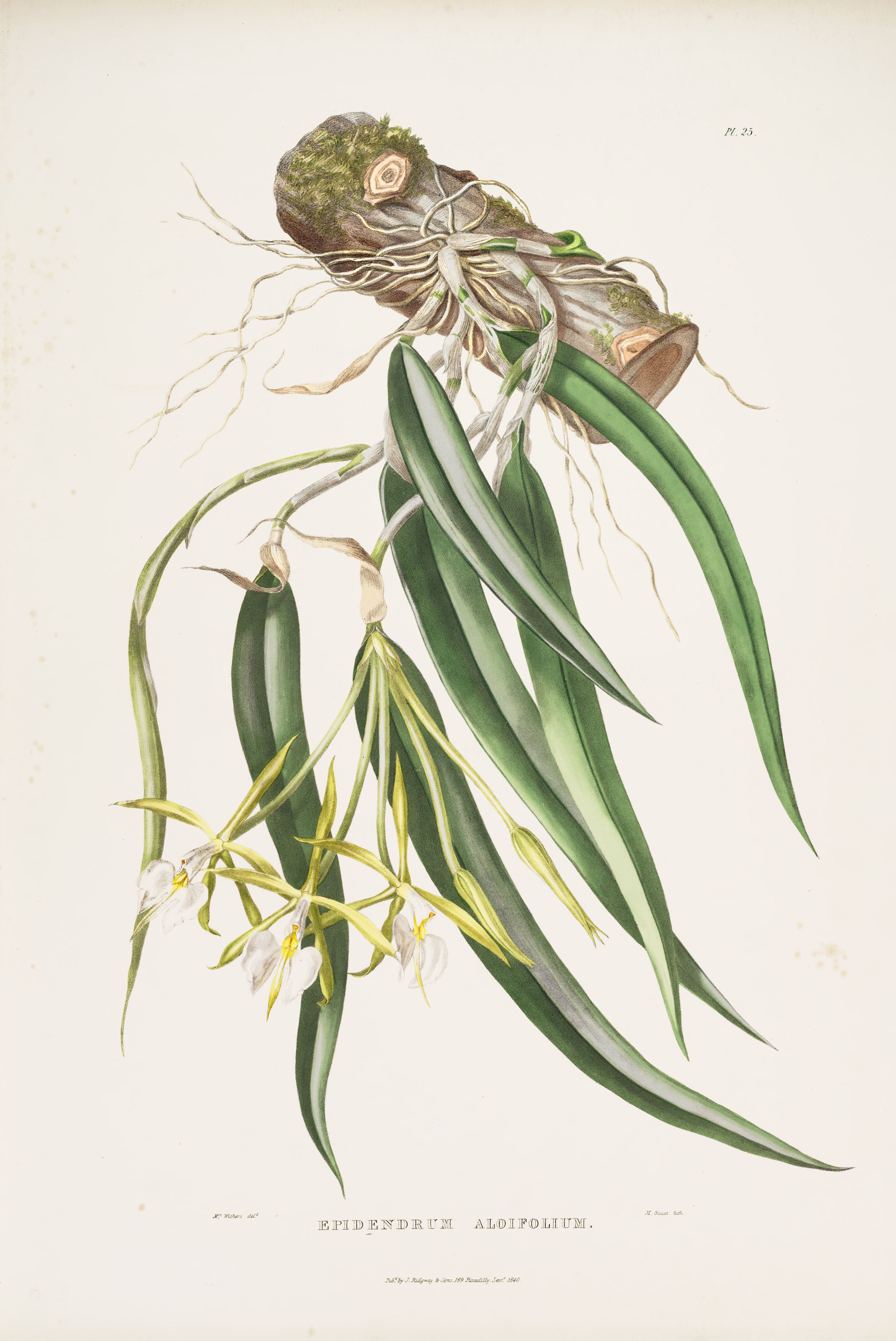
Epidendrum parkinsonianum

Epiphyte house at Knypersley Hall, with many pots with holes in their sides, suitable for epiphytic plants

Architectural drawings of two epiphyte houses

A page with a monochrome tailpiece illustration of a suspension bridge made of natural materials over the Polochic River, Guatemala

Cartoon by George Cruikshank: "Cockroach hunting after unpacking orchids" in the book's preface

== Reception ==
'Librarian's Nightmare' cartoon by George Cruikshank, satirising James Bateman's massive book, included in the book's preface

The book was so large and heavy that Bateman described it (in the preface) as "the librarian's nightmare"; this description was accompanied by a cartoon by George Cruikshank of a gang of "Lilliputian" men attempting to hoist a gigantic book using a tripod of tall poles, ropes, and pulleys, some of the men being crushed in the process; a taskmaster tries to organise the work using a megaphone, and several demons dance as they watch the scene. Katharine Marshall of the Royal Society calls the huge book "an elephant folio... the largest ever produced on botany."

In 1994, the botanical artist Wilfrid Blunt described it as "probably the finest, and certainly the largest, botanical book ever produced with lithographic plates... In size and in splendour, Bateman's giant folio eclipses the works of all who went before or came after him. Maxim Gauci, who was born in Malta, executed the forty lithographs... a master of the process, he ranged his tone from the palest of silvery greys to the richest velvet black; his outline is never mechanical or obtrusive; and the hand-colouring -- whoever may be responsible for it -- is executed with consummate skill."

Will Beharrell of the Linnean Society writes that it was perhaps "the most remarkable and ostentatious of the mid-nineteenth century flower books", commenting that it marked "a high point in the fashion for grand botanical works, pioneered by John Sibthorp and Ferdinand Bauer's Flora Graeca some thirty years earlier."

Stephen Sinon of the LuEsther T. Mertz Library of the New York Botanic Garden comments that the book is famous for its "extraordinary hand-colored lithographic plates". He states that nearly all the plates portray species new to science at that time, "named after various English noble families"; the identifications were made by botanists including John Lindley, who specialised in orchids.

The Huntington Library comments that Bateman paid collectors "to poach orchids on his behalf, and ship countless carefully packed specimens to his English estate." It adds that the plates may seem to be nothing more than accurate portrayals of the specimens, but that in reality all such botanical illustrations are "exemplary composites of information filtered through the artist's eye and hand", with information from specimens, notes, and perhaps advice from a botanist.

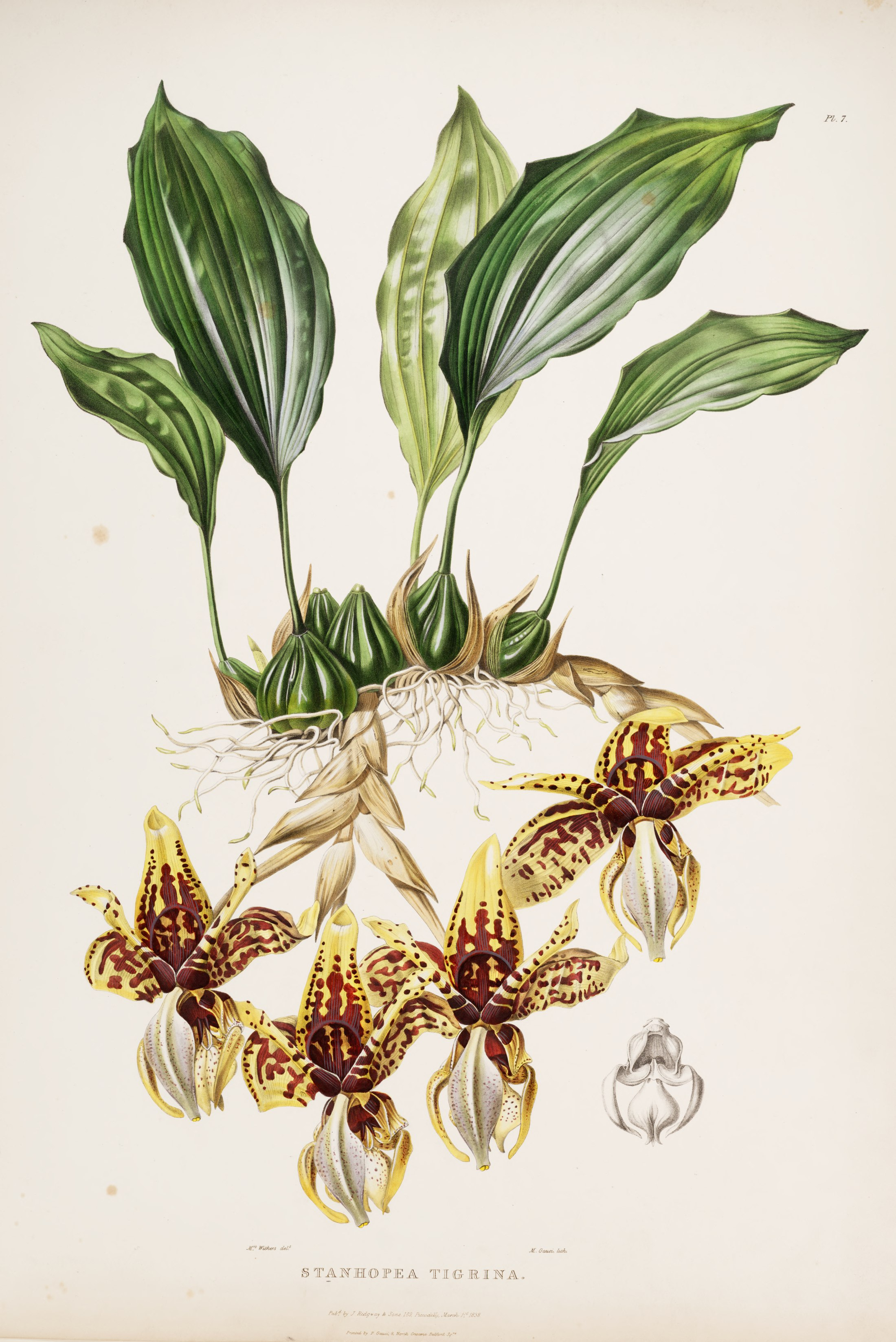
The book's illustration of Stanhopea tigrina, drawn by Mrs. Augusta Innes Withers

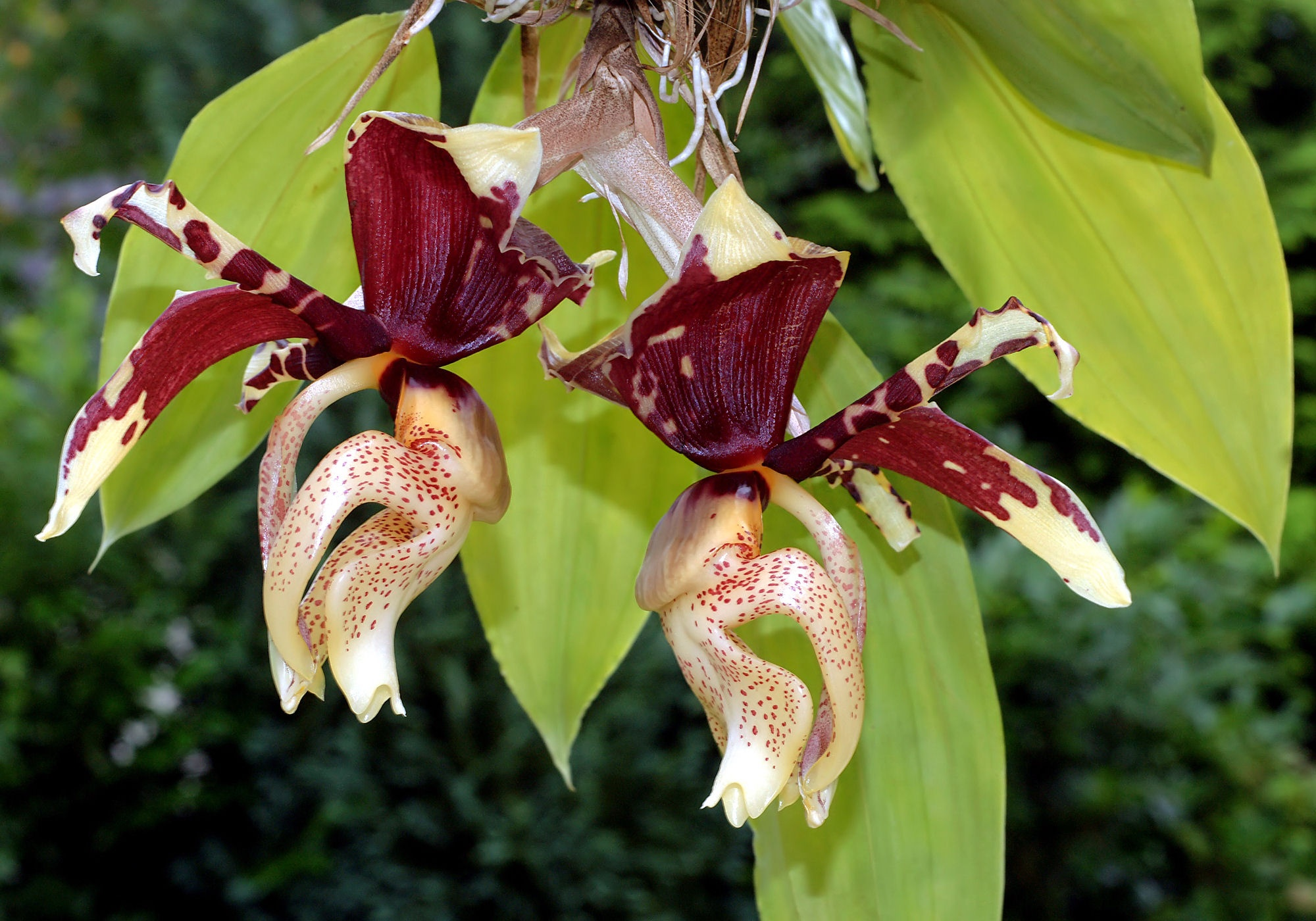
A photograph of Stanhopea tigrina growing in a botanic garden

== Legacy ==
The book is now extremely rare; Bateman brought it out during the Orchidelirium (orchid mania) of the Victorian era, and no more than 55 copies have survived into the 21st century. A copy sold for $75,000 at auction in 2013.

A surviving but damaged copy of the book was used in the Spode pottery factory in Staffordshire, near Bateman's house, Knypersley Hall. Illustrations were cut from the book, and copper plates were engraved from them for use in decorating pottery, probably between 1838 and 1850. Other Spode orchid patterns survive as pottery pieces not described in the company's pattern books, probably because they were special commissions such as a tea service that survives in Chertsey Museum. Spode also manufactured porous terracotta hanging baskets for growing orchids.
