= Stephen Peacocke (disambiguation) =

Steve Peacocke is an Australian actor.

Stephen Peacock(e) may also refer to:

- Stephen Ponsonby Peacocke, landscape painter
- Stephen Peacock (character), a character from the TV series Are You Being Served?
