= Epidendrum aloifolium =

The taxon Epidendrum aloifolium refers to:

- Epidendrum aloifolium Bateman (1842), a synonym of Epidendrum parkinsonianum
- Epidendrum aloifolium L. (1753), a synonym of Cymbidium aloifolium
