= Orchidelirium =

Victorian era orchid-collecting fad

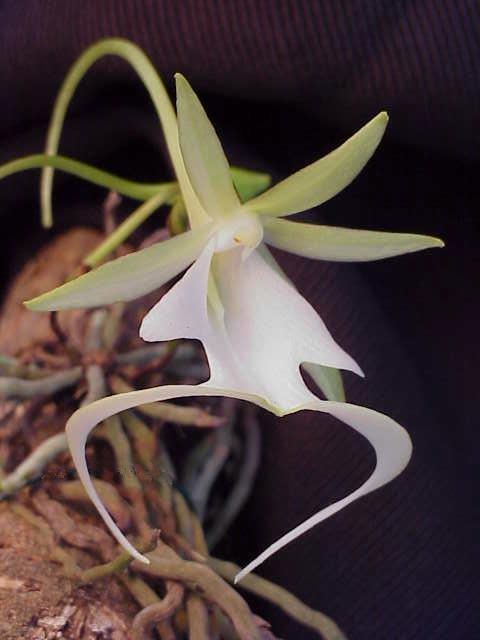
A ghost orchid (Dendrophylax lindenii)

Orchidelirium, also called orchidomania or orchid fever, is the name given to the Victorian era's flower madness for collecting and discovering orchids. Wealthy orchid fanatics of the 19th century sent explorers and collectors to almost every part of the world in search of new varieties and species of orchids.

Orchidelirium is seen as similar to Dutch tulip mania. Orchid madness still exists to a degree today, which has sometimes resulted in the theft of exceptional orchids, such as the ghost orchid, from collectors.

== History ==
In the 19th century, orchids were brought to Europe through collecting expeditions. Initially the craze was limited to the European upper classes. New exotic orchids were most often sold at auction in London, fetching extravagant prices. The rich spent a fortune on orchids that died due to unsuitable conditions.

Commissioned collectors traveled all over the world for months in search of new species. Many died on these expeditions due to conflict with locals or rival orchid-hunters engaging in destructive behaviours. These expensive expeditions were often shrouded in secrecy and it was not unusual for collectors to spread misleading information about the locations where new orchids were found.

During this time, very little was known about the cultivation of orchids and their survival rate was dismal. Through experimentation and by gathering more information on the growing conditions of orchids in their natural habitat, knowledge was slowly developed. By 1851, B.S. Williams published the first edition of The Orchid Grower's Manual.

Culturally, man-eating plant mythos was developed throughout the nineteenth century around plants foreign to European audiences which were introduced due to importation, like orchids. Examples of Victorian tales with vampiric orchids are H.G. Wells' 1894 short story The Flowering of the Strange Orchid and Fred M. White's 1898 The Purple Terror.

Today, international trading of orchids harvested in the wild is now banned by the Convention on International Trade in Endangered Species of Wild Fauna and Flora (CITES), adopted in 1973. Still, many orchid species are endangered. Orchid smuggling is thought to contribute to the loss of some species of orchids in the wild.

== See also ==
- Moyobamba, known as the 'City of Orchids', which has some 3,500 species of orchid native to the area
- Orchid hunters
- The Orchid Thief, a non-fiction book written by Susan Orlean
- Orchidaceae of Mexico and Guatemala, an extremely large 1843 book on orchids
- Adaptation., a movie based on the Susan Orlean book The Orchid Thief
- Nero Wolfe, a fictional detective and orchidophile
- Tulip mania, a period in the Dutch Golden Age during which prices for bulbs of the newly introduced tulip reached extraordinarily high levels
