= Paul Gauci =

English lithographer (fl.1830s–1860s)

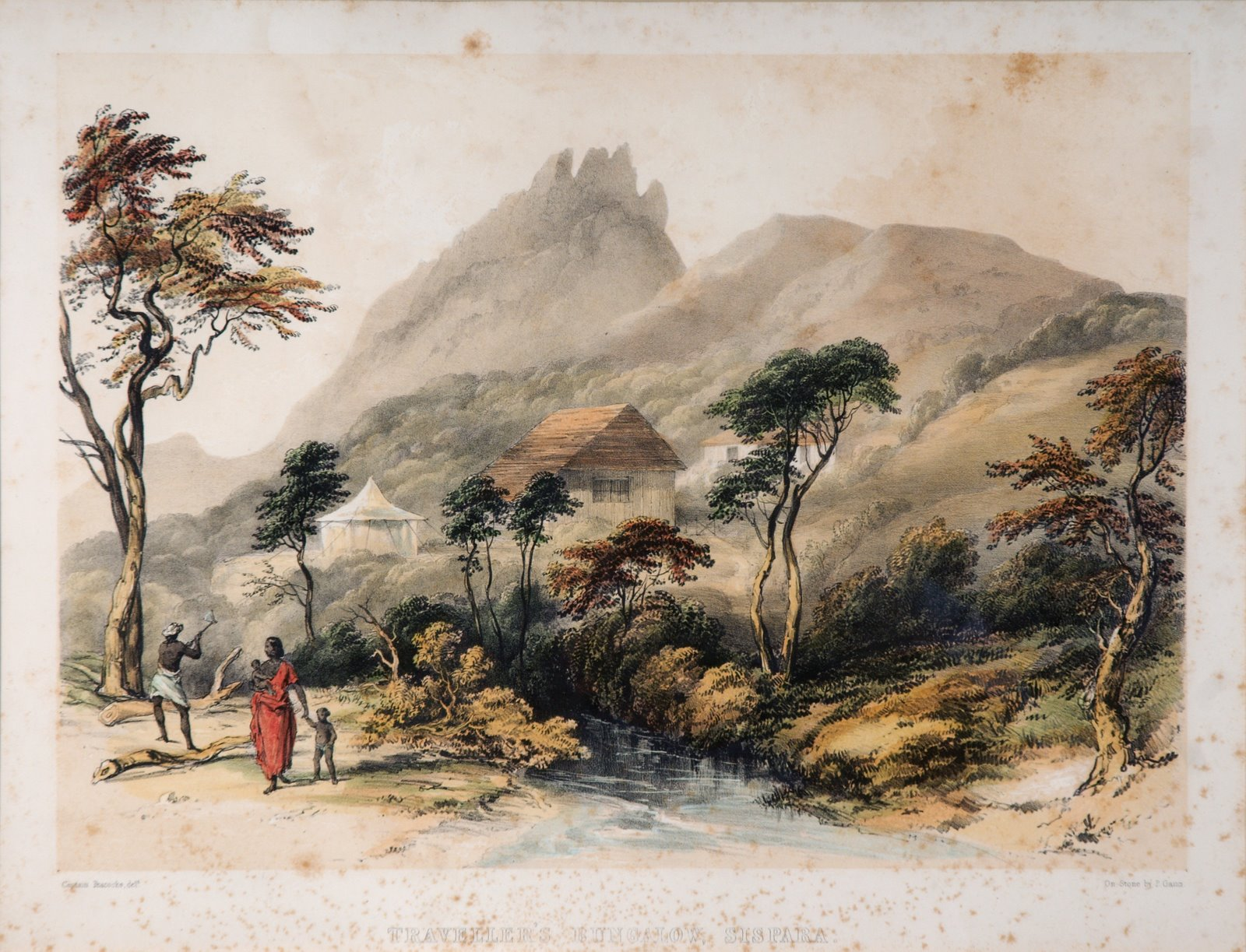
Sispara - Traveller's Bungalow (1847) by Stephen Ponsonby Peacocke lithography by Paul Gauci

Paul Gauci (fl. 1830s – c. 1860s), was an English lithographer of Maltese descent, carrying on a business in London with his father, Maxim Gauci, and brother, William. The firm, located at 9 North Crescent, Bedford Square, was among the leading lithographers of the day, ranking with Charles Joseph Hullmandel and Vincent Brooks, Day & Son.

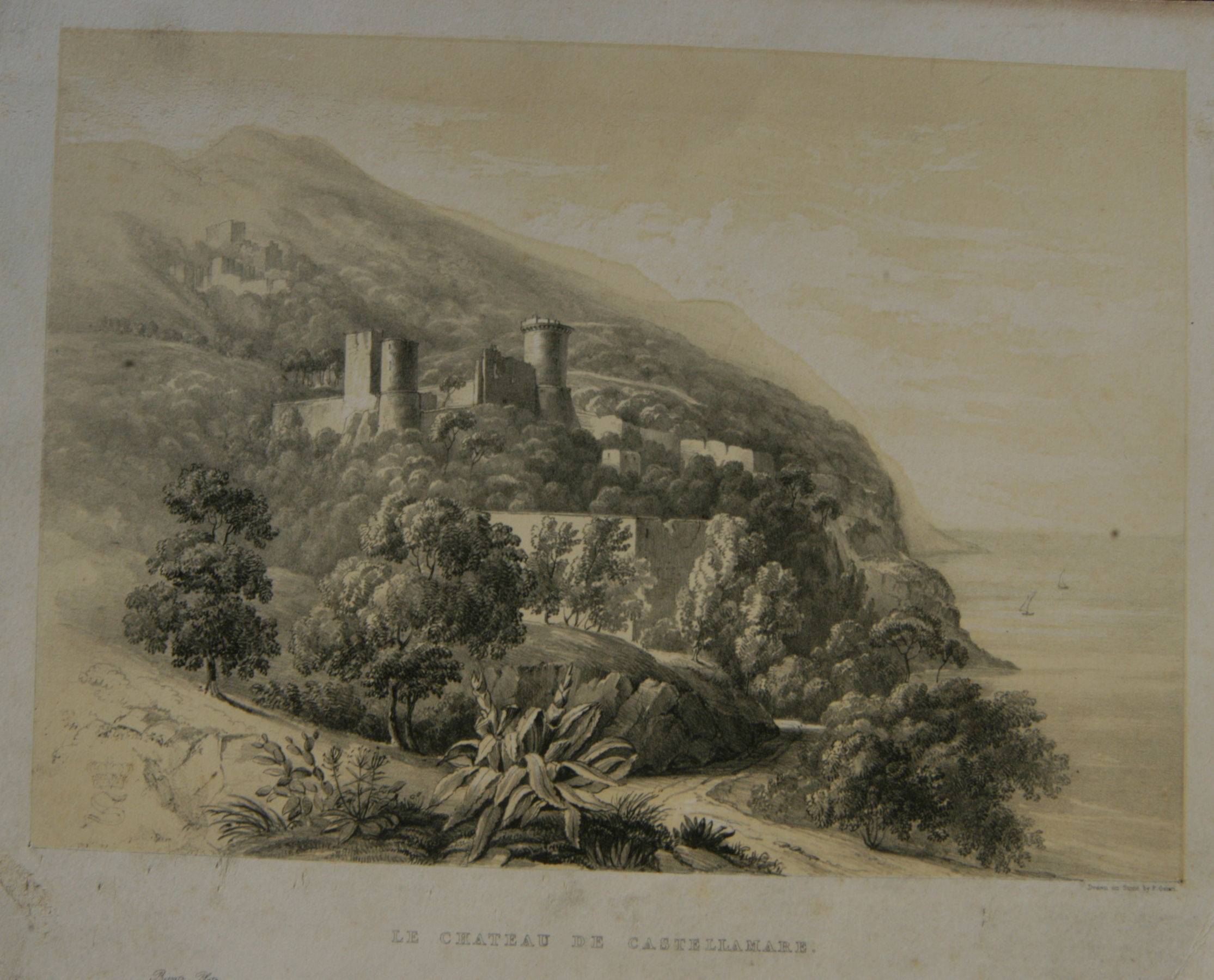
Lithograph of chateau de Castellamare, drawn by Paul Gauci.
