= Maxim Gauci =

Maltese painter and lithographer (1774–1854)

- Born: Massimo Gauci; 11 February 1774; Valletta, Hospitaller Malta
- Died: 3 November 1854 (aged 80); London, United Kingdom

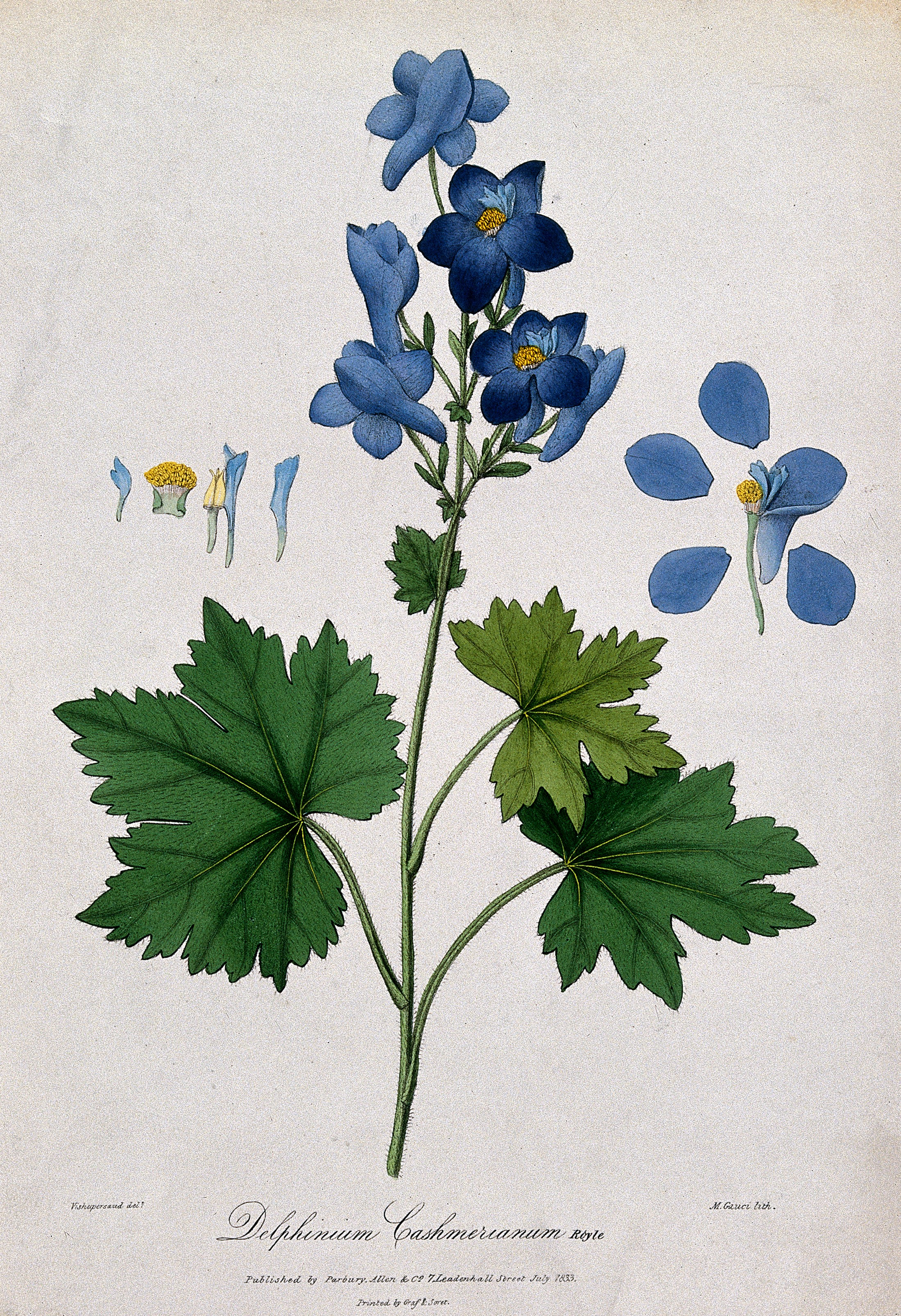
Lithograph of Delphinium cashmerianum by Gauci, c. 1833

Maxim Gauci (11 February 1774 – 3 November 1854), born Massimo Gauci, was a Maltese lithographer and painter who was active in the United Kingdom in the 19th century. He was an early exponent of lithography for botanical illustration.

== Life ==
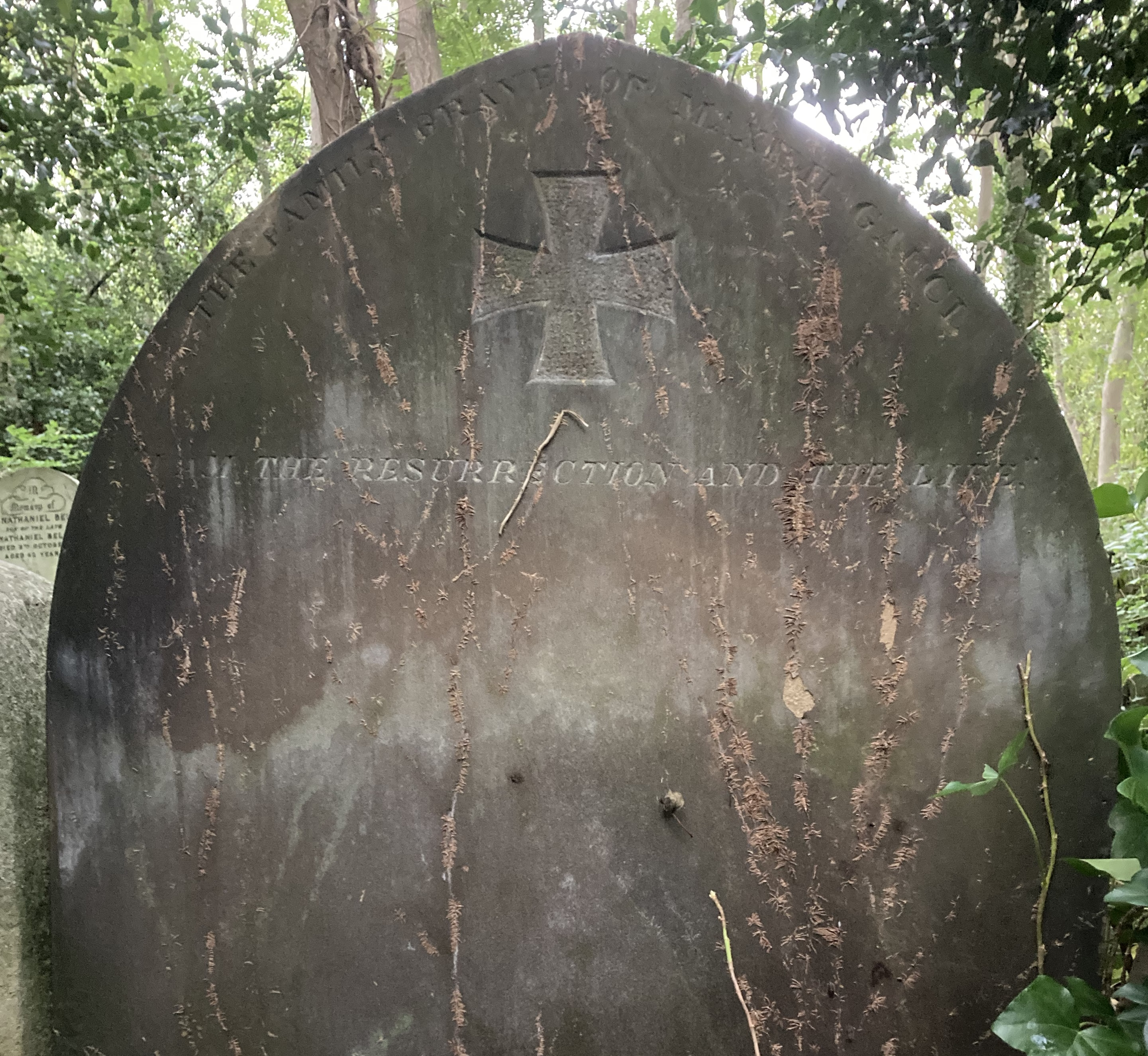
Family grave of Maxim Gauci in Highgate Cemetery

Gauci was born in Valletta, Malta on 11 February 1774. He studied painting under Michele Busuttil, and was later sent to the Accademia di San Luca in Rome on the recommendation of Grand Master Emmanuel de Rohan-Polduc.

Gauci eventually moved to Paris, and married there in 1804. While he was there, he was known as Maxime Gauci and he worked in the studio of Jean-Baptiste Isabey. He was father of William Gauci, another printer, and the landscape painter Paul Gauci.

Gauci travelled to Egypt and the Middle East before settling in London in 1809. He never went back to Malta, but he was often visited by his relatives and other Maltese people. Gauci remained active until his eyesight began to decline, and he died in London on 3 November 1854, at the age of 80.

He was buried in the Gauci family grave on the western side of Highgate Cemetery.

== Works ==
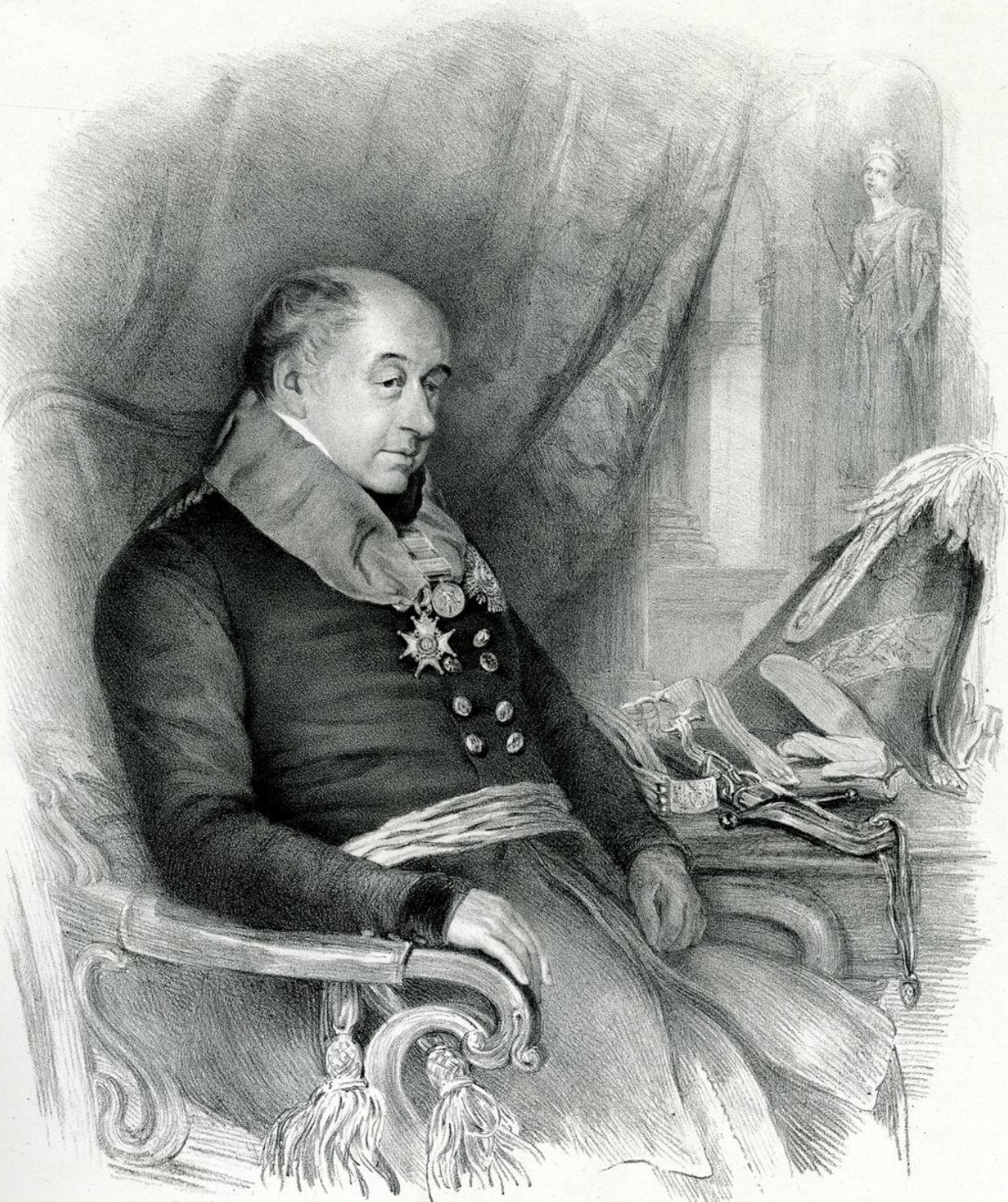
Lithograph of Edward Gibbs, c. 1834–1850

His firm completed works that included Nathaniel Wallich’s Plantae Asiaticae Rariores and James Bateman's enormous Orchidaceae of Mexico and Guatemala (1837–43), boasting the largest lithographic plates ever produced. Wilfrid Blunt had nothing but praise for Gauci, calling him “a master of the process, he ranged his tone from the palest of silvery greys to the richest velvet black; his outline is never mechanical or obtrusive.”

He also produced the lithography for John Forbes Royle, Illustrations of the botany and other branches of the natural history of the Himalayan Mountains, and of the flora of Cashmere. Vol.II – Plates, London: Wm.H. Allen & Co., 1840.

Gauci also painted portrait miniatures in his early career, and he later produced lithographed portraits. Many of his portraits are in the National Portrait Gallery, London. See here
