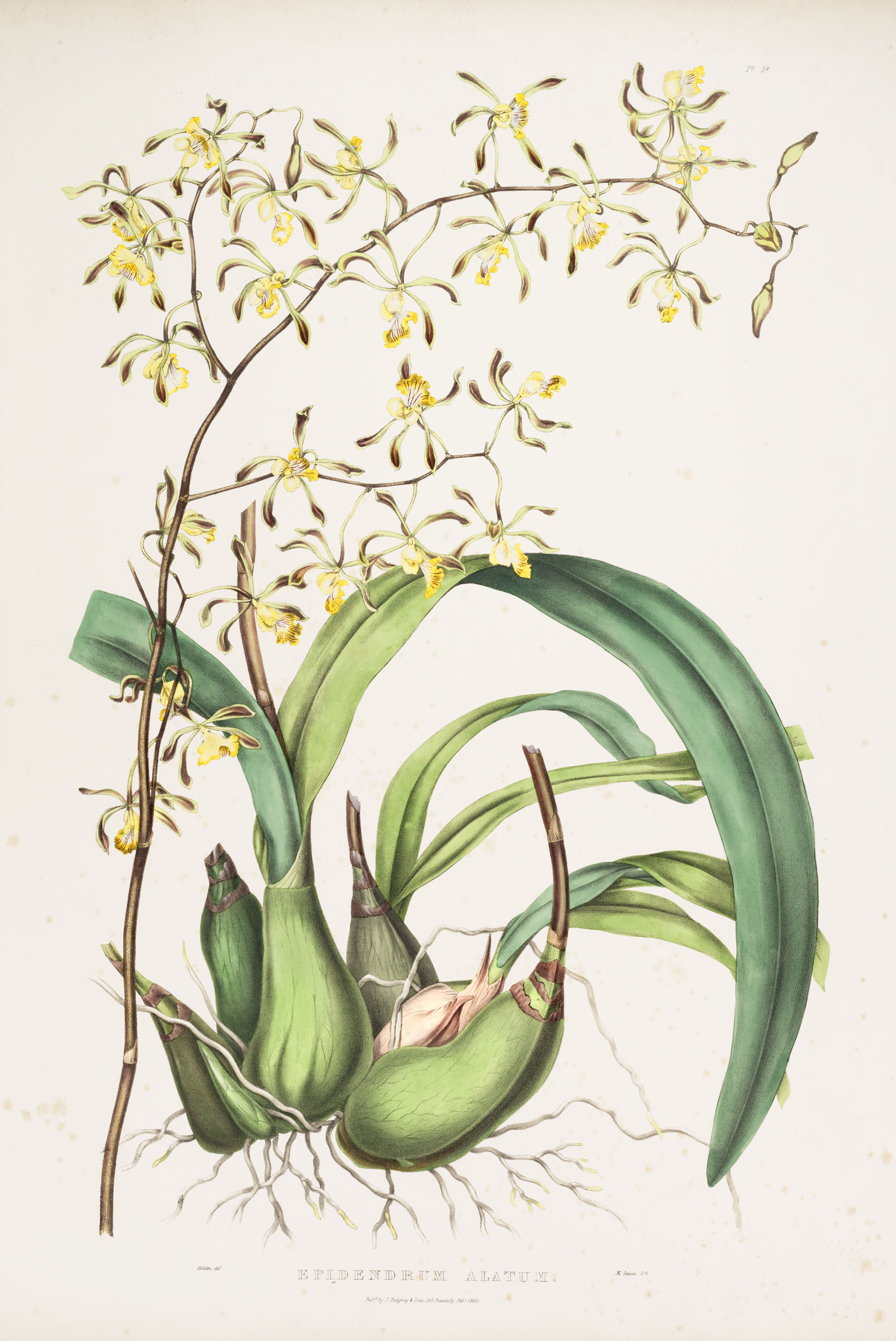

Scientific classification
- Kingdom: Plantae
- Clade: Tracheophytes
- Clade: Angiosperms
- Clade: Monocots
- Order: Asparagales
- Family: Orchidaceae
- Subfamily: Epidendroideae
- Genus: Encyclia
- Species: E. alata

Binomial name
- Encyclia alata (Bateman) Schltr.

Synonyms
- Epidendrum alatum Bateman (basionym); Epidendrum alatum var. grandiflorum Regel; Epidendrum alatum var. longipetalum Regel; Epidendrum calocheilum Hook.; Epidendrum formosum Klotzsch; Epidendrum longipetalum Lindl. & Paxton, nom. illeg.

= Encyclia alata =

Species of orchid

Encyclia alata is a species of orchid native from south Mexico through Central America to Panama.

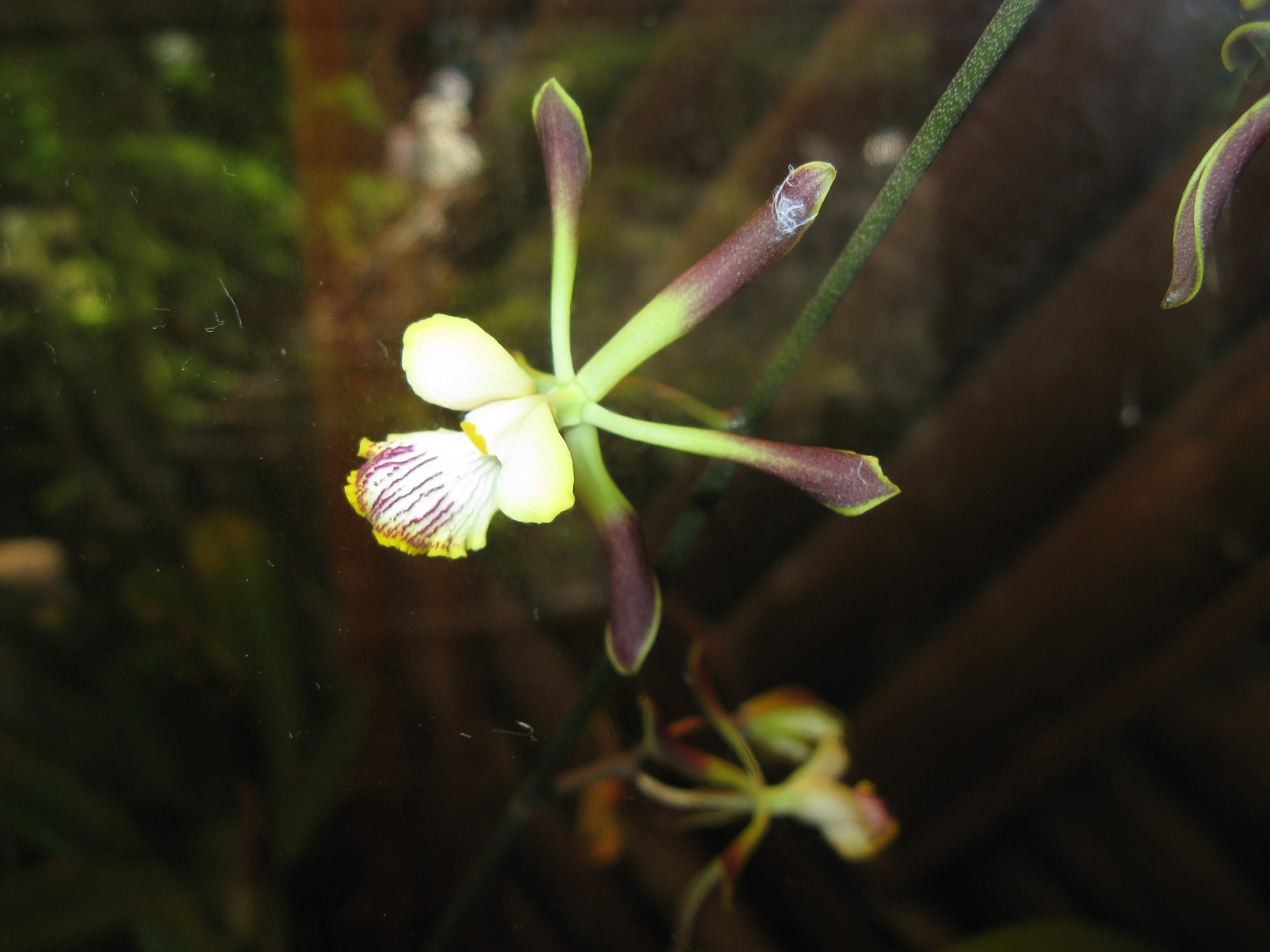
