= Ponsonby Peacocke =

English painter

Stephen Ponsonby Peacocke
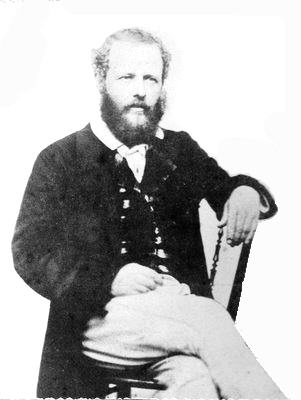
- Captain Stephen Ponsonby Peacocke Jr. c. 1857
- Born: 1813; England
- Died: 30 May 1872 (aged 58–59); New Zealand
- Occupations: Army officer, artist, politician
- Partner: Isabella Anne Louisa Brydges
- Children: Georgina Elizabeth Emma Peacocke; John FitzRoy Beresford Peacocke; Gerald Loftus Torin Peacocke; Reginald Thomas Stephen Peacocke; Ponsonby John Raleigh Peacocke; Ines Eva Isabel Peacocke
- Parent(s): Stephen Peacocke Sr. and Louisa Tottenham Peacocke

Captain Stephen Ponsonby Peacocke (1813 – 29 May 1872) was a British officer of the Bombay Army and an artist notable for his 17 paintings of historic landscape views in the Nilgiri Hills in South India. Tinted lithographs were made of these views and published in imperial folio in London by the lithographer Paul Gauci in 1847. Peacocke's lithographs reflect the romantic escape to a temperate hilly area that all British people in the plains yearned for in those days. His career culminated as a member of the New Zealand Legislative Council from 1866 until his death in 1872.

== Family ==
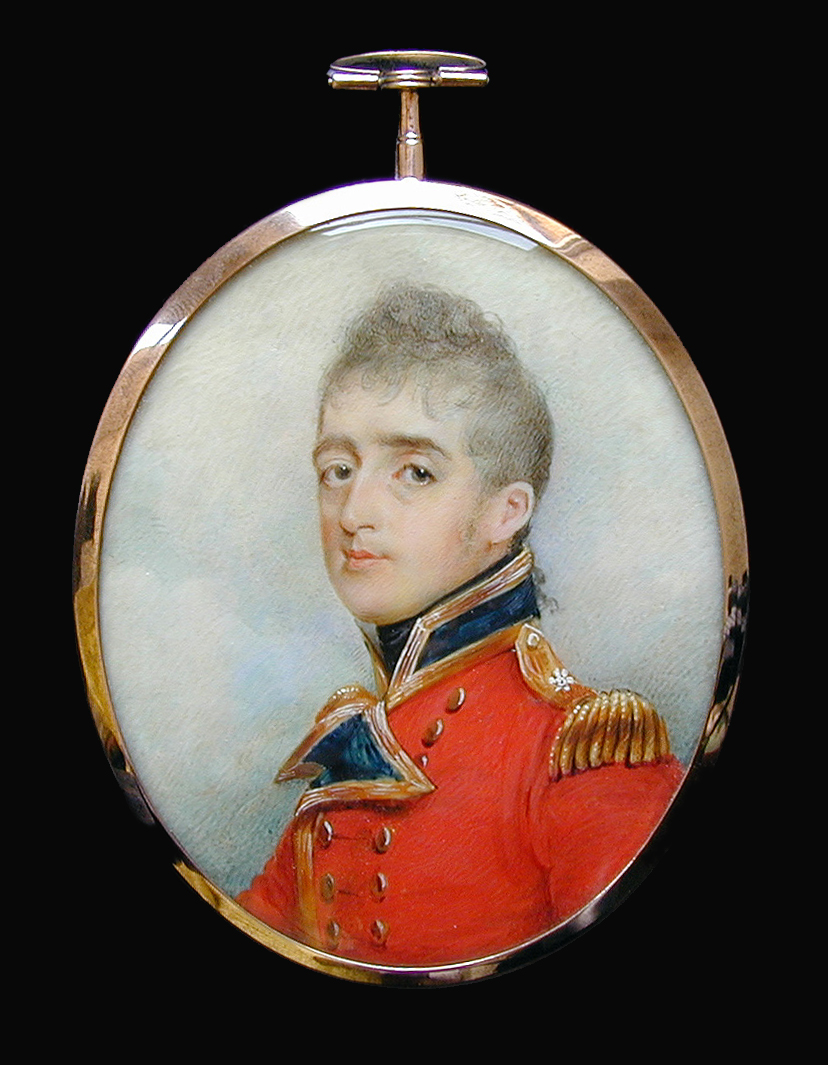
Col. Stephen Peacocke Sr. by George Chinnery, c.1800

Captain Peacocke's parents, Lieutenant Colonel Stephen Peacocke Sr. of the Buffs (Royal East Kent Regiment) (3rd Foot) and Louisa Tottenham Peacocke, were married at Bath, Somerset, in the west of England, on 11 June 1808. There is a fine miniature portrait of Stephen Peacocke Sr., c. 1800, by George Chinnery. There is a love note from Louisa to Stephen in the back of the miniature:

"My beloved, my adored, Stephen, my idolised and matchless husband, married 11 June 1808. Louisa Peacocke"

Their eldest child, Stephen Ponsonby Peacocke Jr., the artist, was born in 1813. He was known by his middle name.

Their second son, Eliott Tottenham Peacocke, was at Tonbridge School 1832–33, joined the 1st Bombay Native Infantry in 1837, was promoted to captain in the 1st Grenadiers Regiment in India in 1847 as Deputy Assistant Quartermaster General of the Army, and died in Bombay aged 38 on 13 July 1854. There was/is supposedly a monument there erected to his memory by his fellow officers.

In 1837, Stephen Ponsonby Peacocke Jr. and Isabella Anne Louisa Brydges born 1815, the daughter of a baronet, were married, probably while he was on leave in England.

Stephen and Isabella Peacocke had four sons and two daughters and at least ten grandchildren. Three of the sons and one daughter were residents of Auckland, and the fourth son settled in New South Wales. They are:

- 1. Georgina Elizabeth Emma Peacocke, of Devonport, New Zealand, born c.1844, Poet, author of a book of verse, Rays from the Southern Cross, died 14 May 1892, at Devonport, NZ.
- 2. John FitzRoy Beresford Peacocke, of Remuera, New Zealand, Born Switzerland, c. 1847, married about 1876 at Auckland at the age of 29 to Florence Pilling, lived in New Zealand sixty years, no known occupation, died 11 June 1917 aged seventy at Woolton Road, Remuera, NZ, buried in the Roman Catholic Cemetery at Howick. Male issue living - aged 36, 33, 28, 26. Female issue living - aged 40, 38, 34, 30.

1. Hilary m 1st Evelyn Wood 2nd Edna.
2. Cyril Thomas DeQuincey Peacocke killed in action WW I.
3. Noel Peacocke.
4. Muriel Charlotte Anne Peacocke, born 1881.
5. Egerton Francis Joseph Peacocke, born 1880, died 1960.
6. Blanch Louisa Peacocke.
7. Frederica Isabel Peacocke, born 1878.
8. Paul Peacocke died in infancy.
9. Florence Blanche Mary Peacocke, born 1876.
10. ? Madge

- 3. Gerald Loftus Torin Peacocke, a Madeira-born English barrister, later editor of the New Zealand Farmer.

1. Inez Isabel Maud Peacocke, born 31 January 1881, a teacher, novelist, broadcaster and poet, married George Edward Cluett on 30 June 1920 in the Holy Trinity Parish Church of Devonport, died childless 1973.

- 4. Reginald Thomas Stephen Peacocke b 1854, went to Australia and married Elizabeth Crook.
- 5. Ponsonby John Raleigh Peacocke.
- 6. Ines Eva Isabel Peacocke, married Thomas Lindesay, of Howick, New Zealand.

== Career ==
Peacocke joined the King's Own Scottish Borderers (25th Foot) infantry regiment as an ensign on 25 October 1833. He was in India in the 1830s with his regiment and was in Ootacamund convalescing from an illness for some time during this period. He was promoted to Lieutenant on 15 September 1837 and Captain 23 August. 1839. In October 1842, Capt. Peacock was furloughed for 3 months to Bombay. In April 1843 he was furloughed to England for nine months for the purpose of effecting an exchange or retiring, either on half-pay or by the sale of his commission. By 1851 he was with the 59th Foot and on 11 November 1851 received a brevet promotion to Major. On the same day he appears on the list of Majors who have retired by sale, by commutation, with a gratuity or by surrender of half pay, not in the reserve. In 1854–55, he appears on the retired list.

== Artworks ==
In the early days, only about 15 years after the founding of Ootacamund, Captain Peacocke created 17 drawings of historic landscape views in the Nilgiri Hills during a medical leave spent at Ootacamund in the late 1830s. His lithographs reflect the romantic escape to a temperate hilly area that all British people in the plains yearned for in those days. It was a home away from home. Furlough was usually only every five years or so but there was the nearby refuge of the cool climate of the Indian hills to seek, especially Ooty with its downs, primulas and strawberries growing wild.

In May 1847, the imperial folio Koondah Ranges, Western Ghauts, Madras, at & about the Stations of Ootacamund and Conoor, and the Segoor, Koondah and Conoor Passes, with vignette title page and sixteen large (54 centimeters (21 in) x 38 centimeters (15 in)) plates after Peacocke was executed in the best style of tinted lithography printed on card stock, with added hand colouring, in contemporary half morocco leather binding with gilt spine for the price of £2, 12s. 6p. The set was published by the lithographer, Paul Gauci, 9 North Crescent, Bedford Square, London.

There are three notable features in all the Peacocke drawings. First, the play of sunlight in the background of these landscapes is realistic and supplies the title the Sunlit Hillscapes to this series. The soft but brilliant glow of light in the South Indian hills is beautifully captured by the artist in each of the drawings. Second, the graphical perspective in his topographic representations is very lifelike. The elevations and distant houses are all in proportion and scale. The distant views, with scale and depth, give drama to Peacocke's landscapes. Third is attention to detail away from the central focus of the work. For example, in View in the Hills, Hullikkul, one can see that the hills to top left are dotted about with houses, not apparent on a cursory glance, all perfectly positioned, topographically, and in perspective. Capt. Peacocke was trained in surveying in the Army and used this training to good effect in his Neilgherry views.

Other than their 1847 publication, the lithographs are undated and the sequence of the original paintings is unknown. In an advertisement in Allen's Indian Mail the lithographs are listed in the following order:

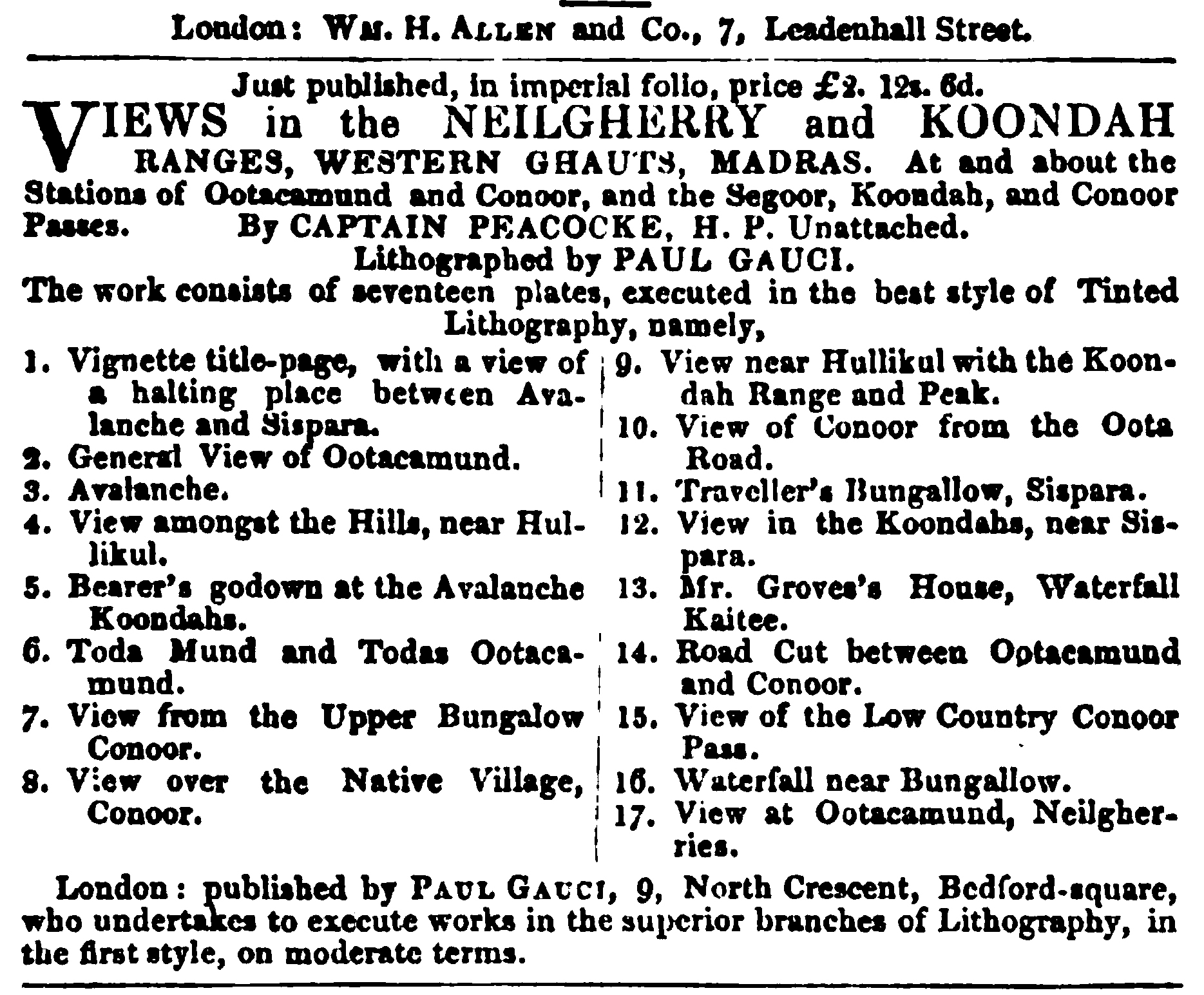
Advertisement for Peacocke lithographs, Allen's Indian Mail, 1846

1. Vignette title-page, with a view of a halting place between Avalanche and Sispara. (This may be Bangitappal.)
2. General View of Ootacamund.
3. Avalanche.
4. View amongst the Hills, near Hullikul.
5. Bearer's godown at the Avalanche
6. Toda Mund and Todas Ootacamund
7. View from the Upper Bungalow, Conoor
8. View over the Native Village, Conoor.
9. View near Hullikul with the Koondah Range and Peak
10. View of Conoor from the Oota Road
11. Traveller's Bungallow, Sispara.
12. View in the Koondhas, near Sispara.
13. Mr. Grove's House, Waterfall Kaitee.
14. Road Cut between Ootacamund and Conoor
15. View of the Low Country Conoor Pass.
16. Waterfall near Bungallow.
17. View at Ootacamuud, Nilligierries.

=== Gallery of lithographs ===
The following gallery of Peacocke's landscape lithographs is ordered geographically from the Low Country & Coonoor Pass, up through General View of Ootacamund and continuing west up along the Sispara Ghat road past Avalanche and culminating in the most dramatic geography in the Nilgiri Hills; View in the Koondahs, near Sispara.

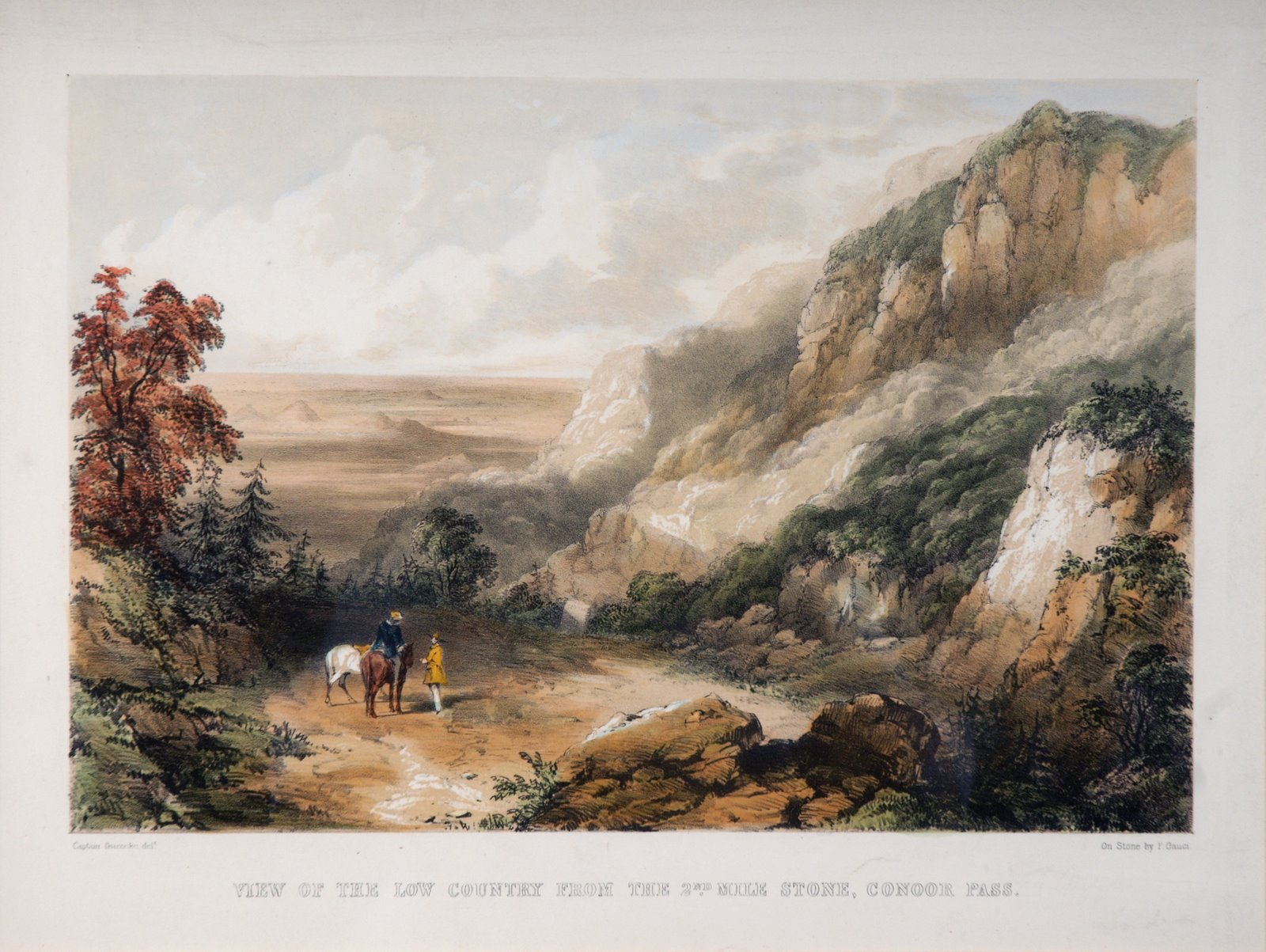
(*) A View of the Low Country & Coonoor Pass

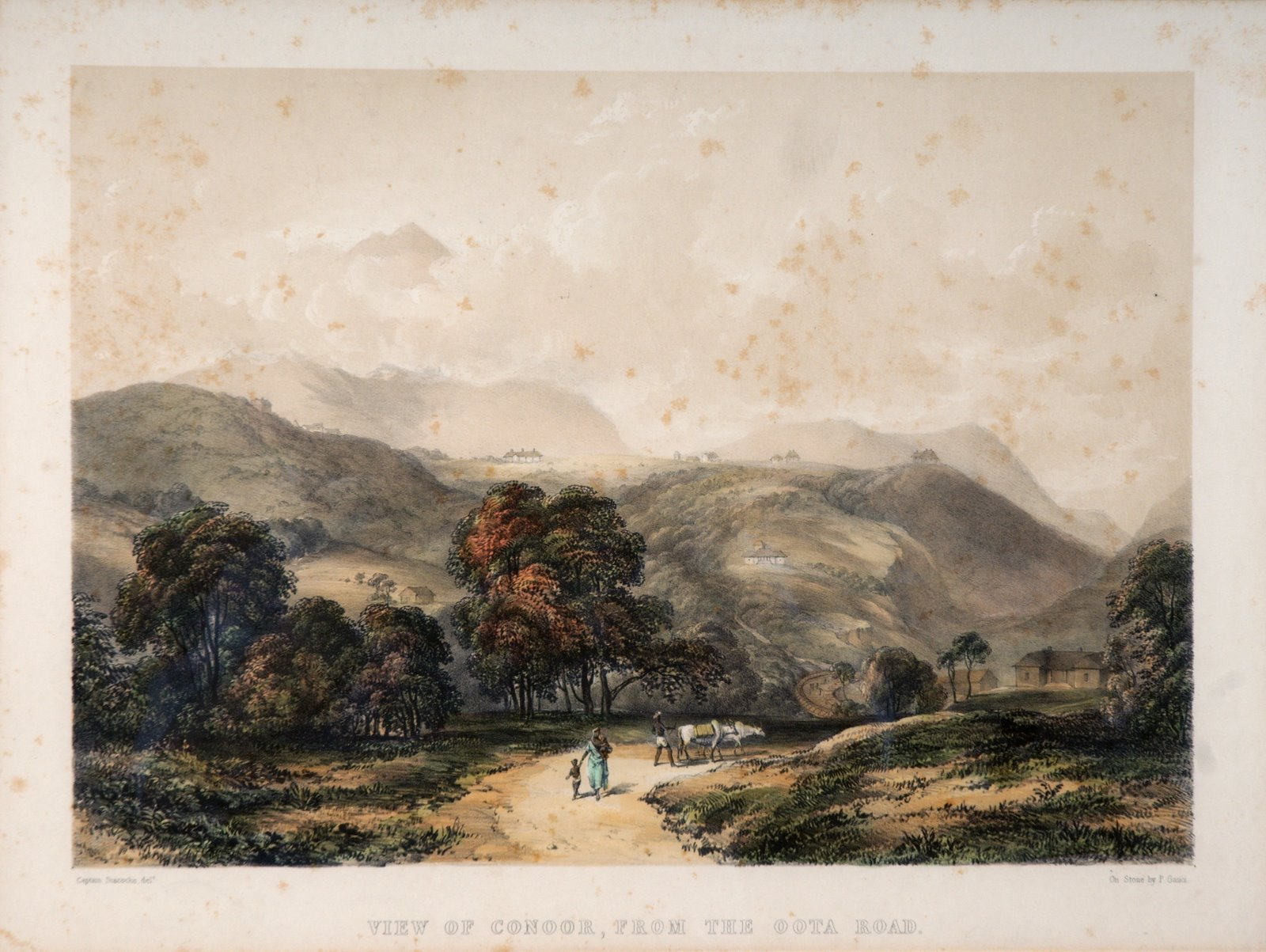
(*) View of Coonoor from the Ootah Road

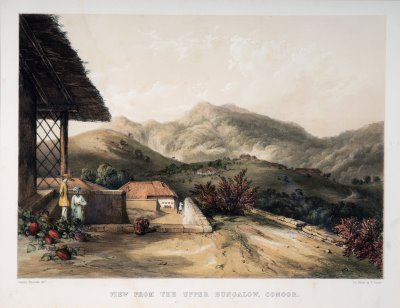
(*) View from the Upper Bungalow, Coonoor

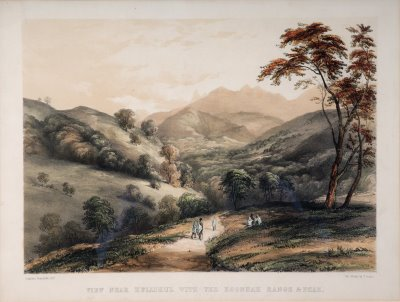
(*) View Near Hullikul, Koondahs

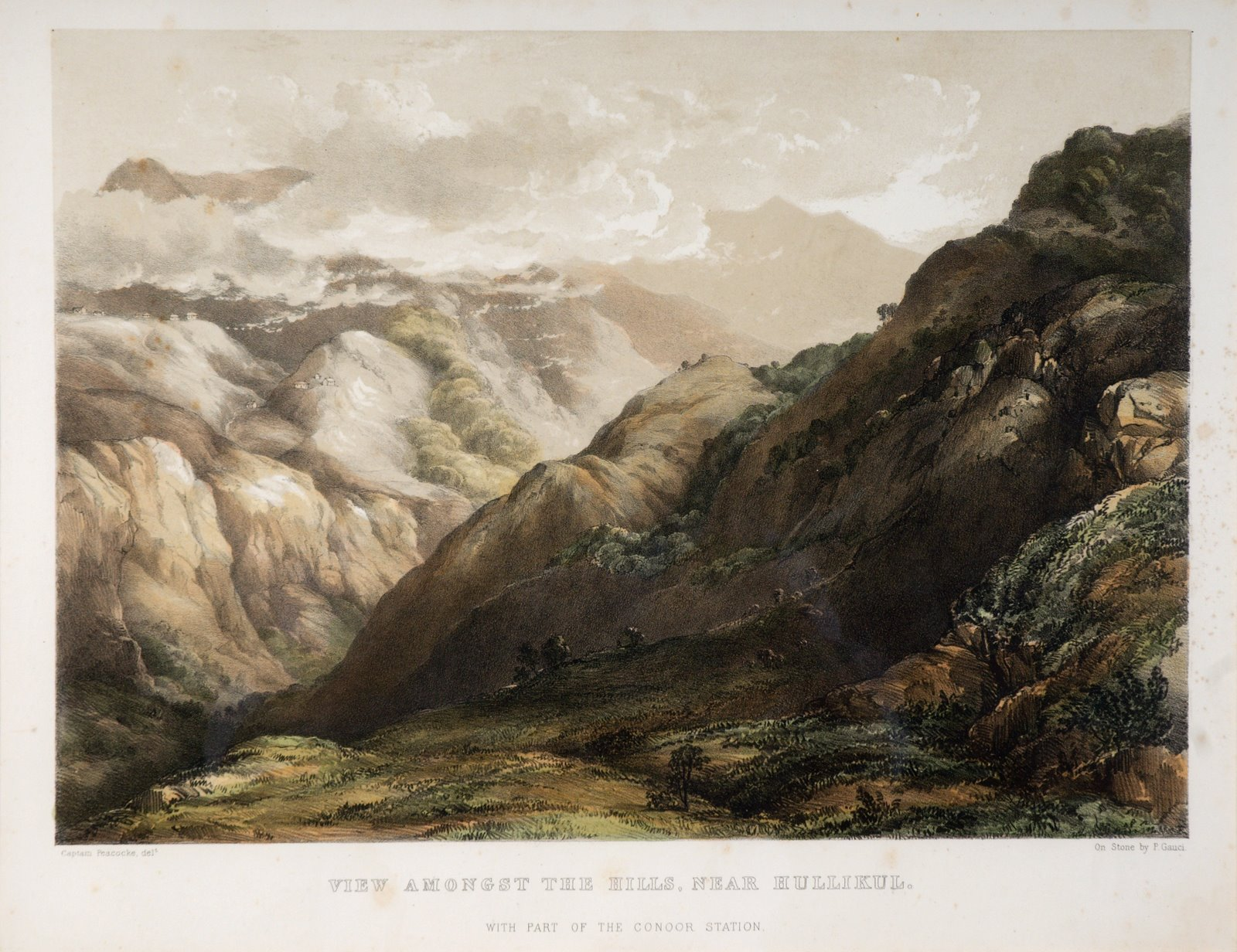
(*) View in the Hills, Hullikkul

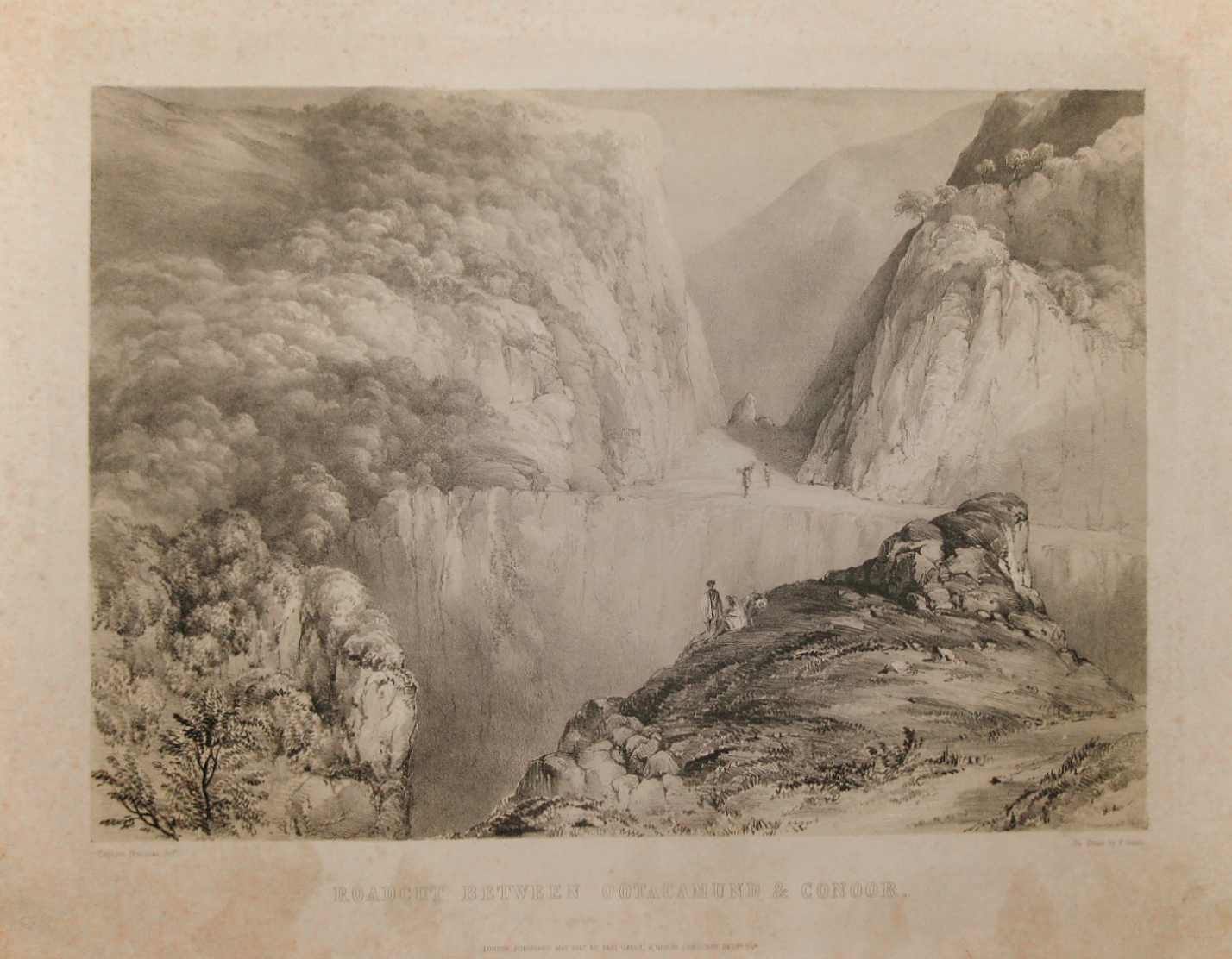
Roadcut Between Coonoor & Ootacamund

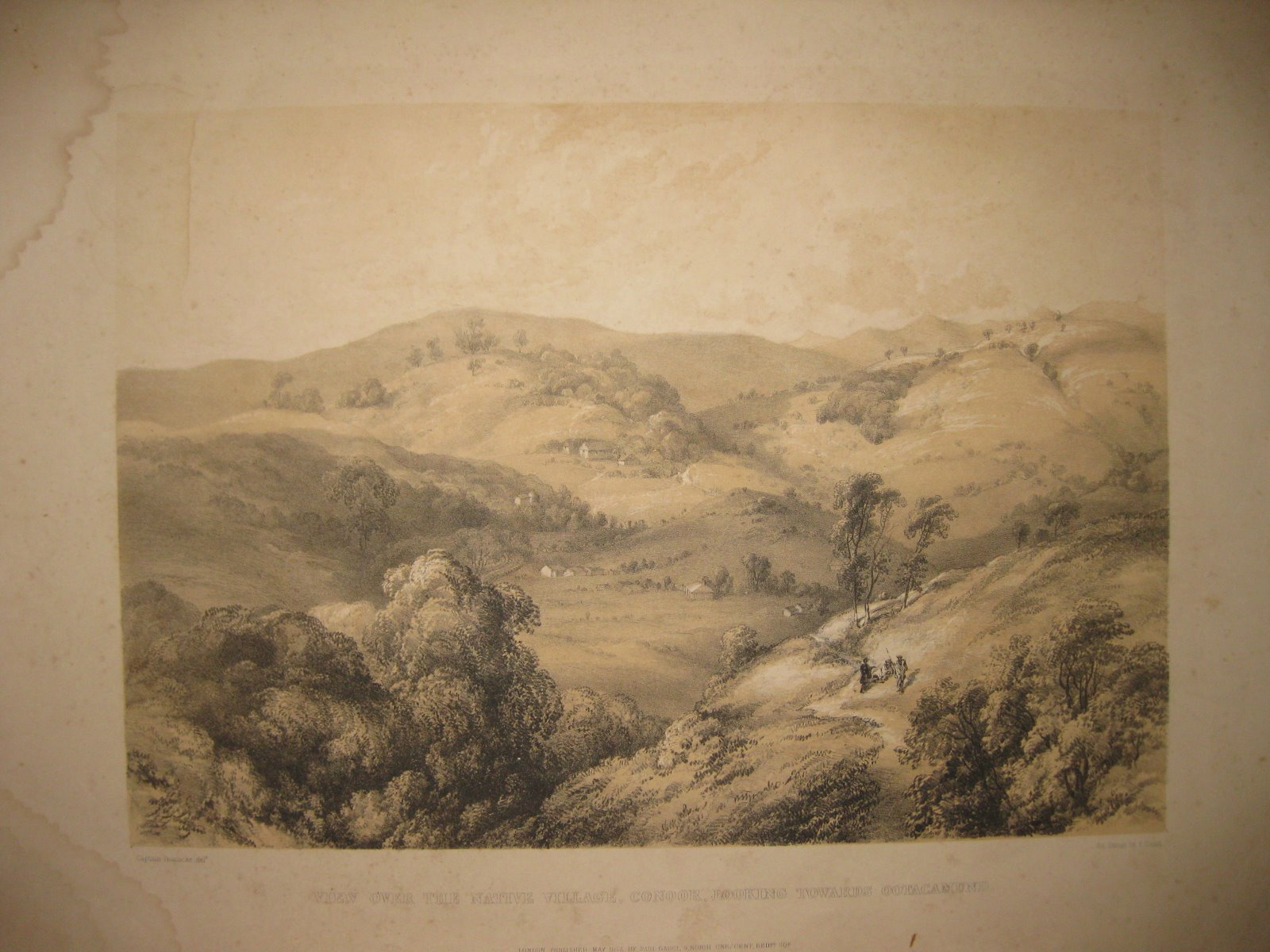
View Over the Native Village, Coonoor, Looking Towards Ootacamund

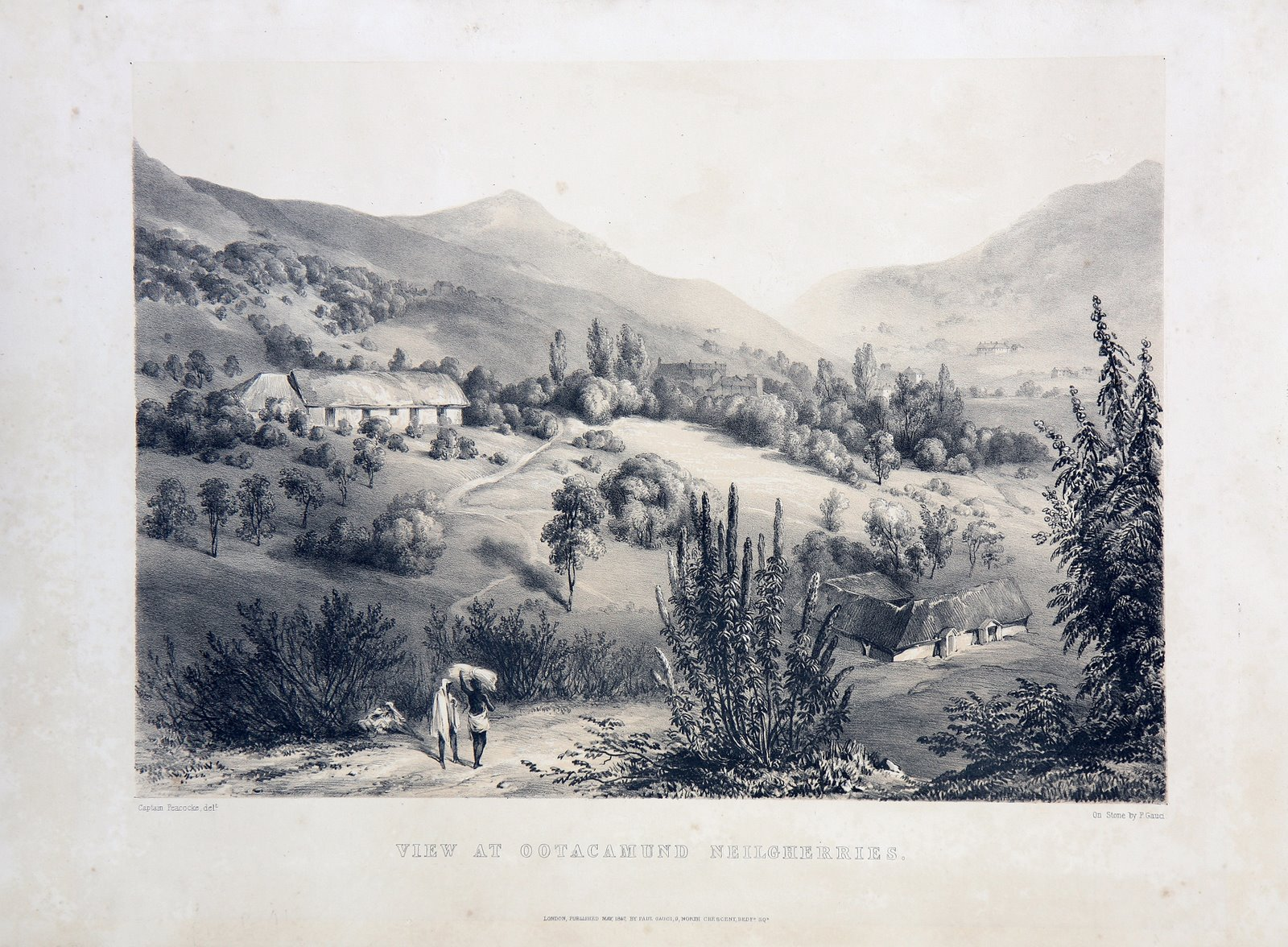
Government House View at Ootacamund, Neilgherries

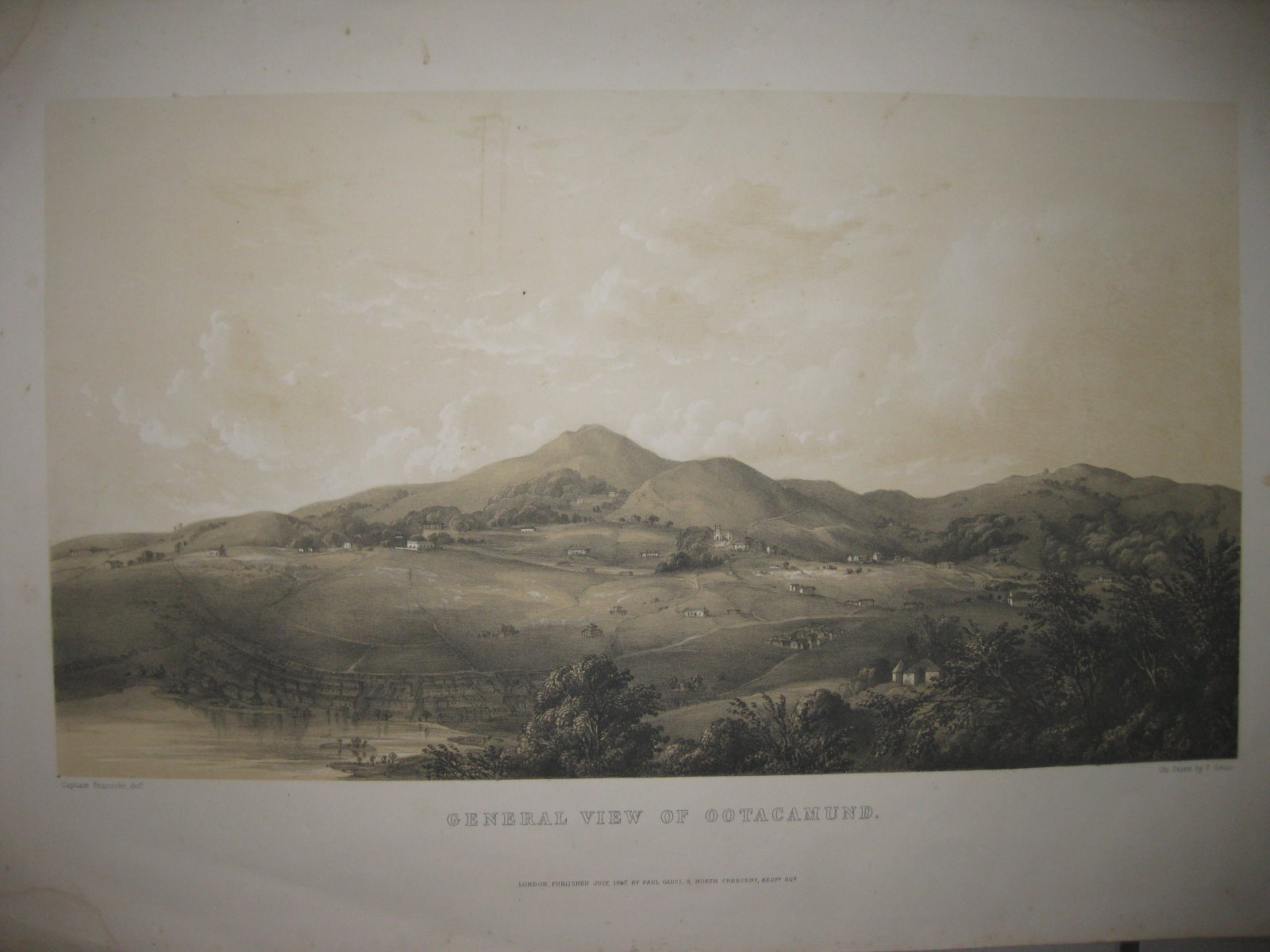
General View of Ootacamund

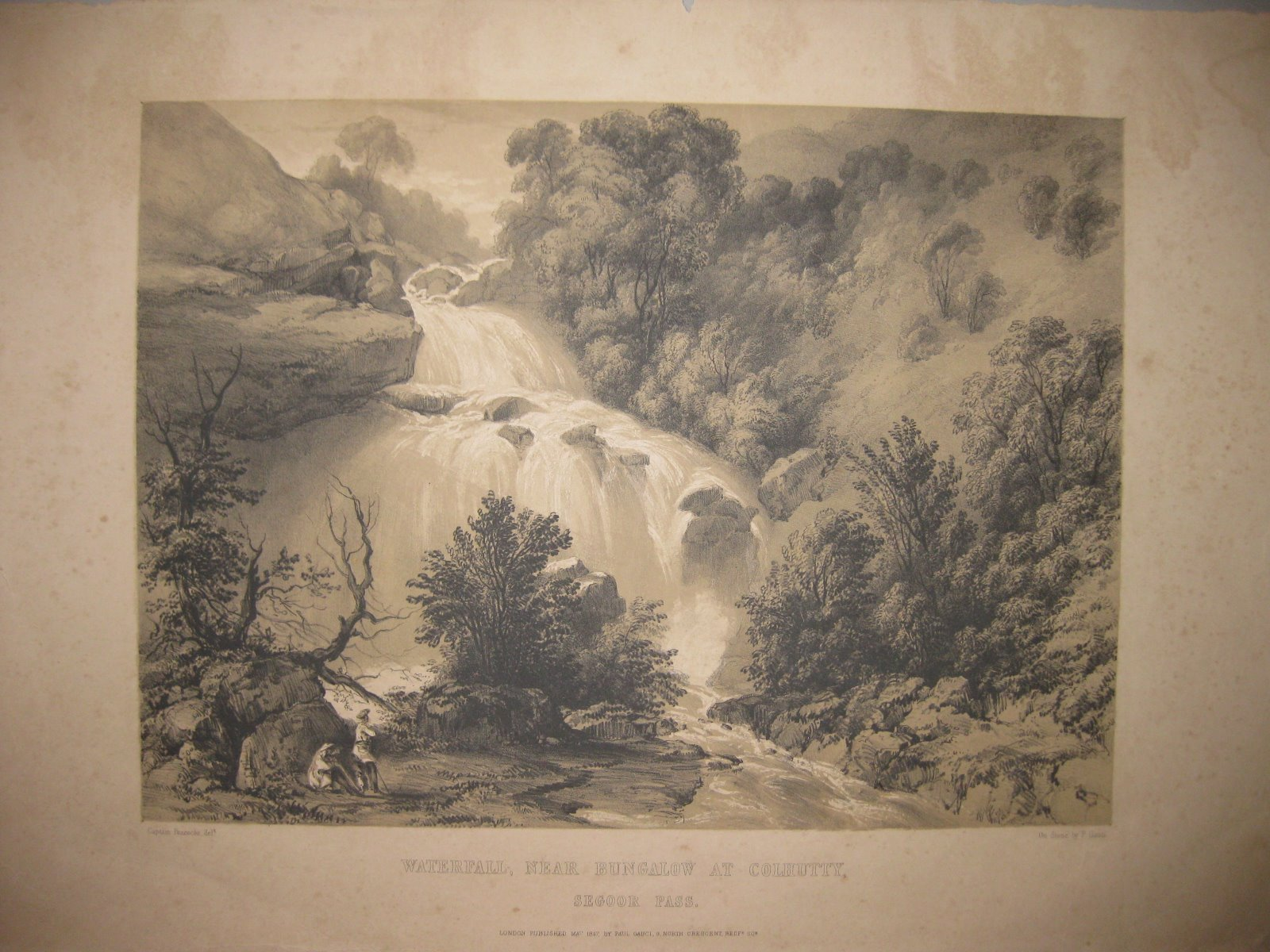
Waterfall from Bungalow at Colhutty, Segoor pass

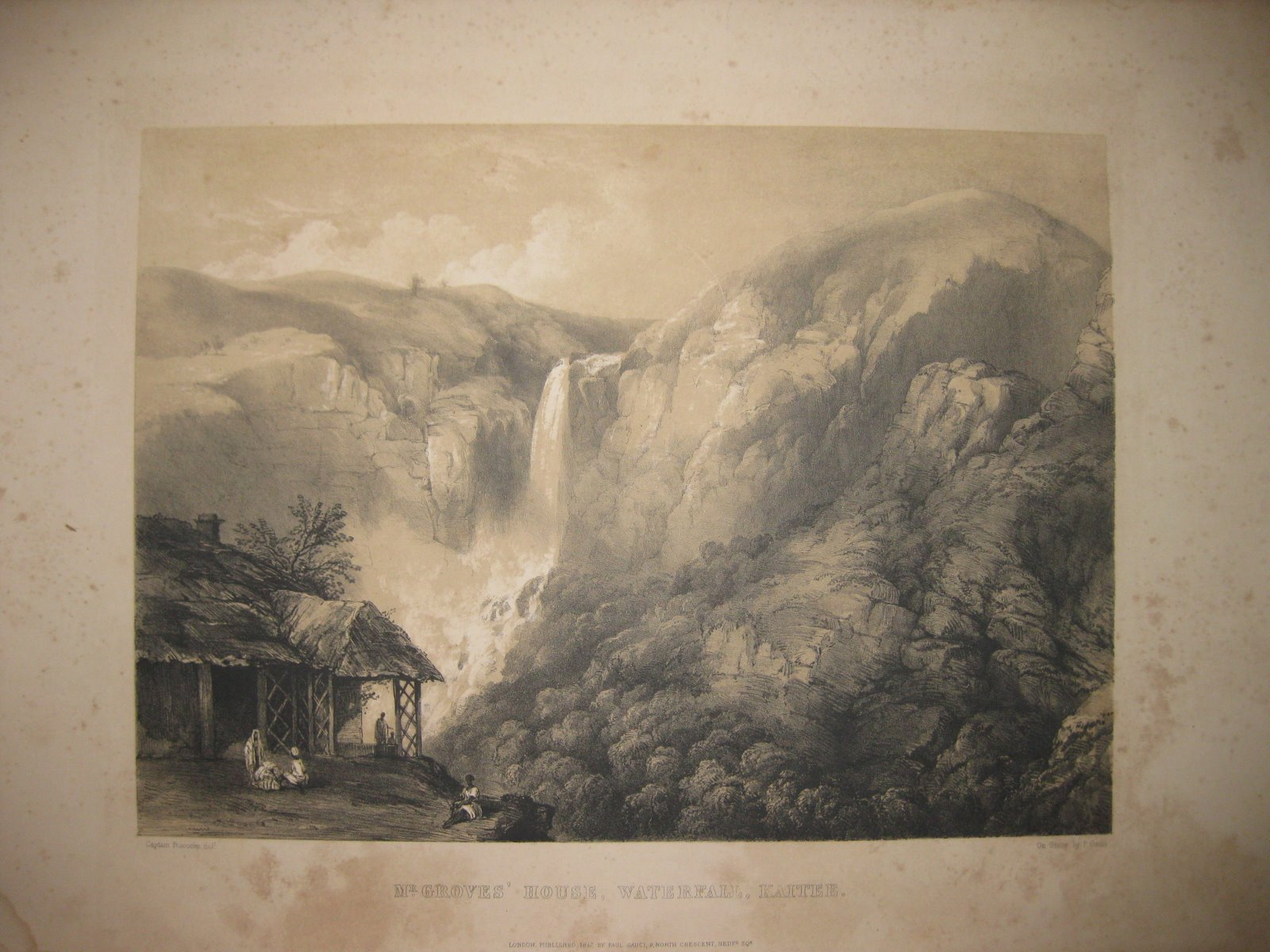
Mr Grove's House, Waterfall, Kaitie

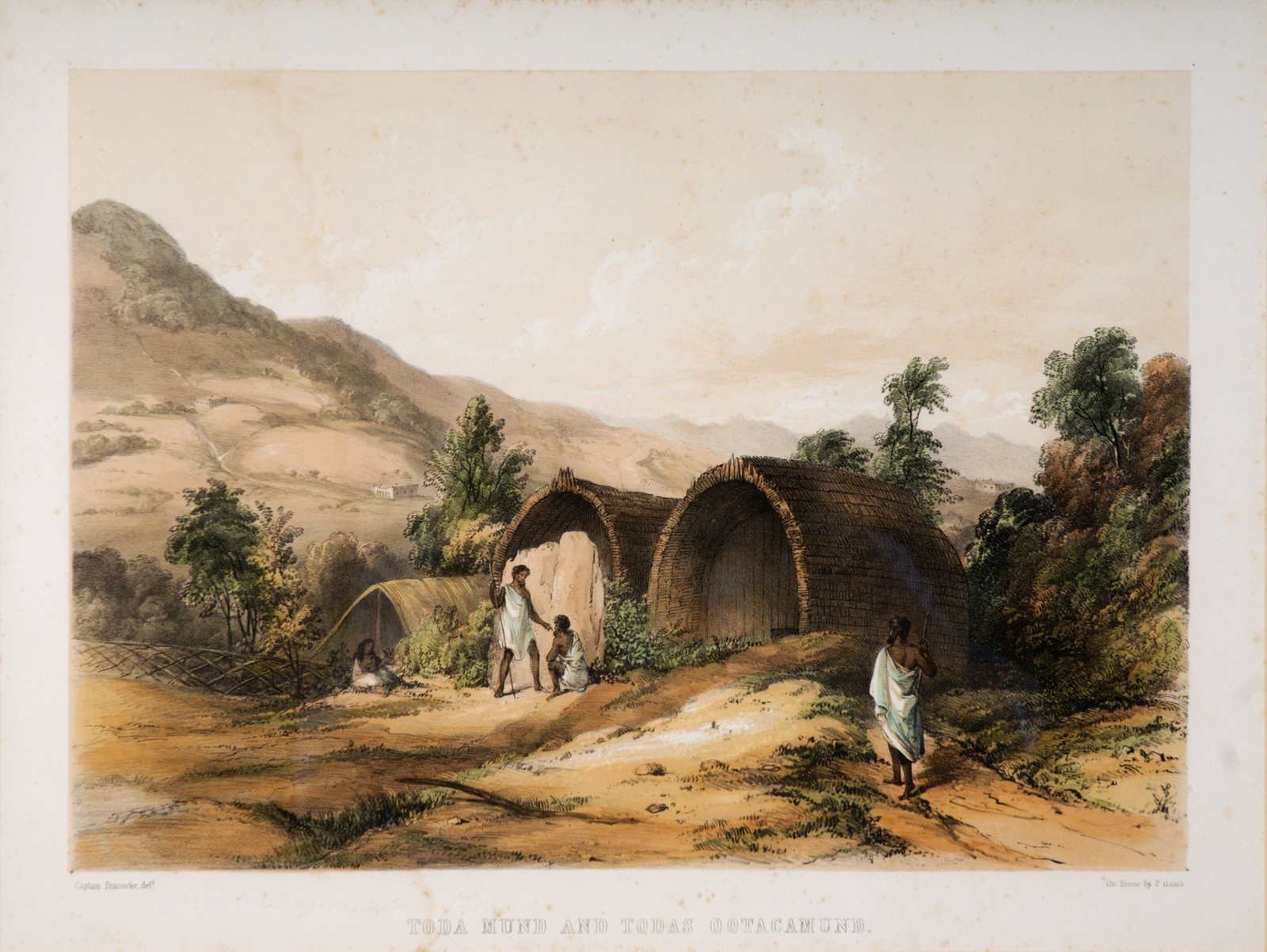
(*) Todas Munds (Huts) & Toda people

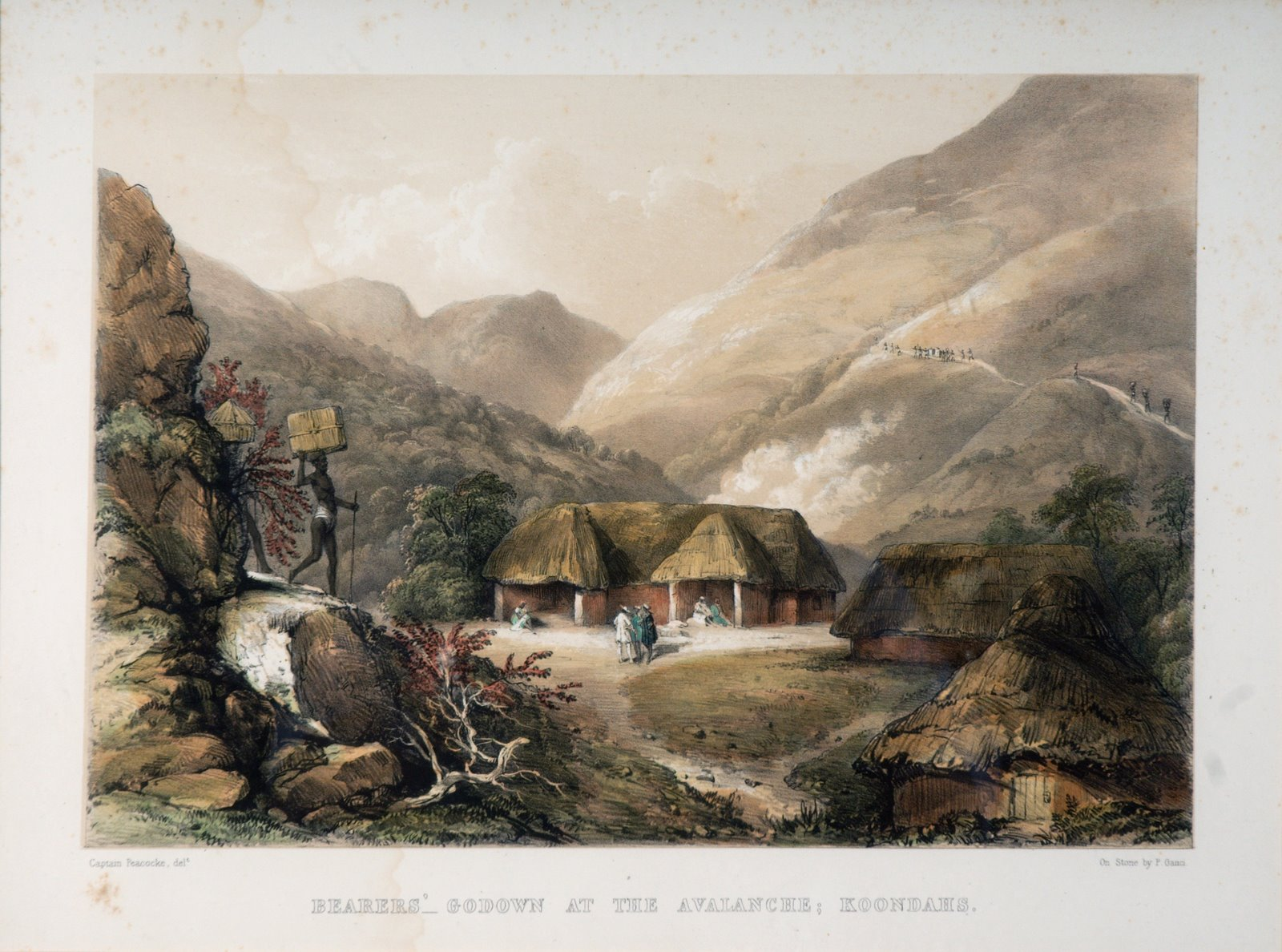
(*) Bearers godown at the Avalanche

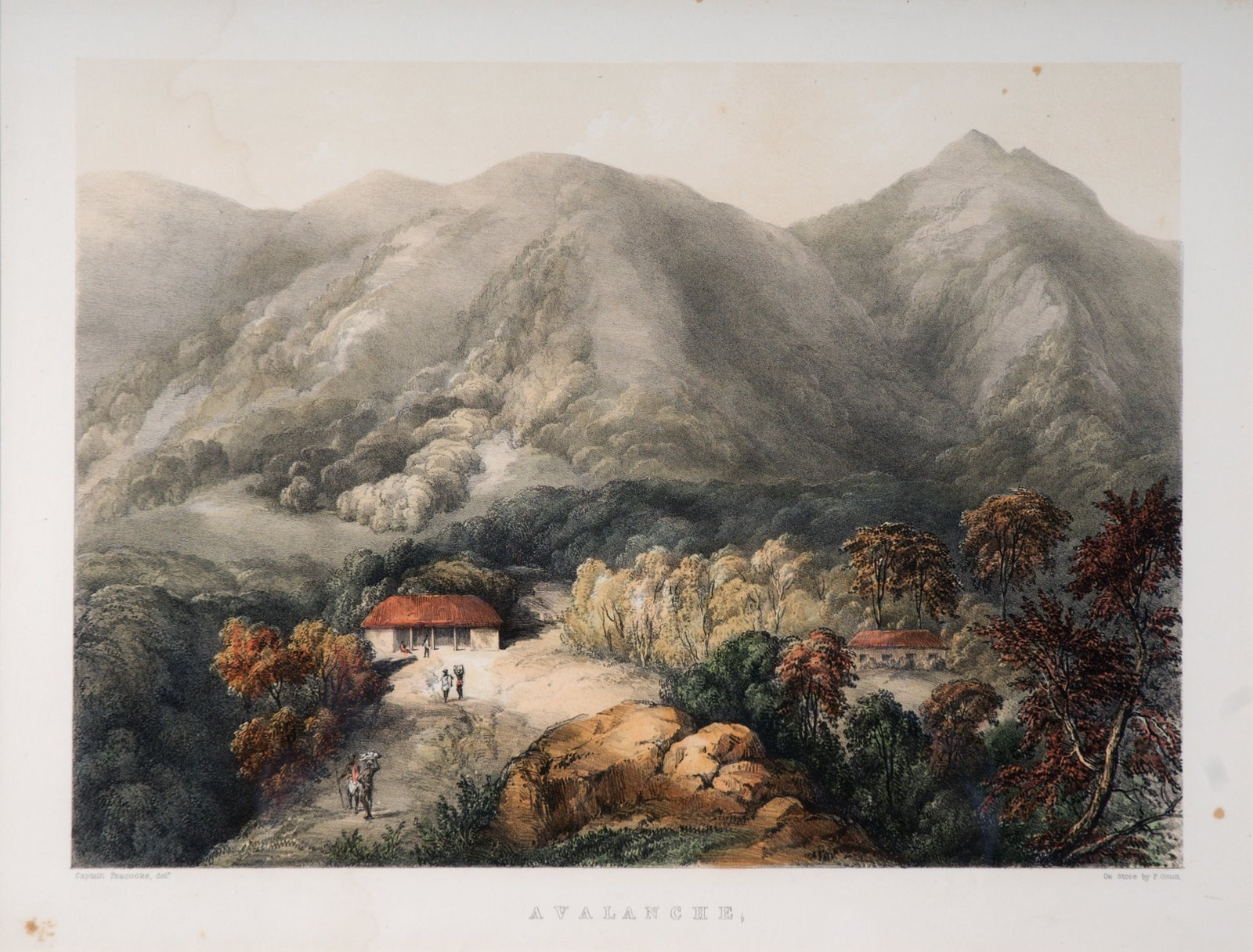
(*) The Avalanche

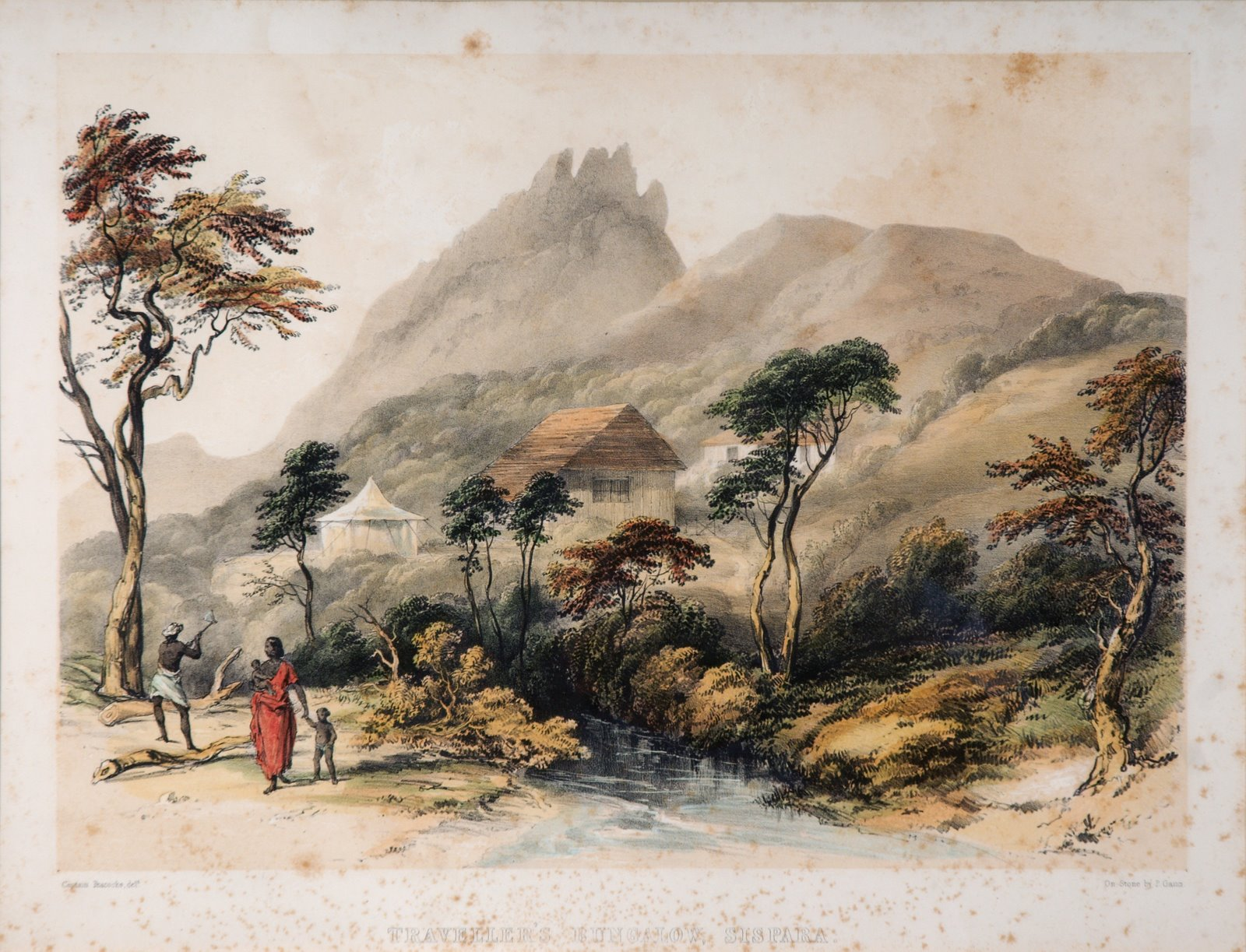
(*) Travellers' Bungalow, Sispara

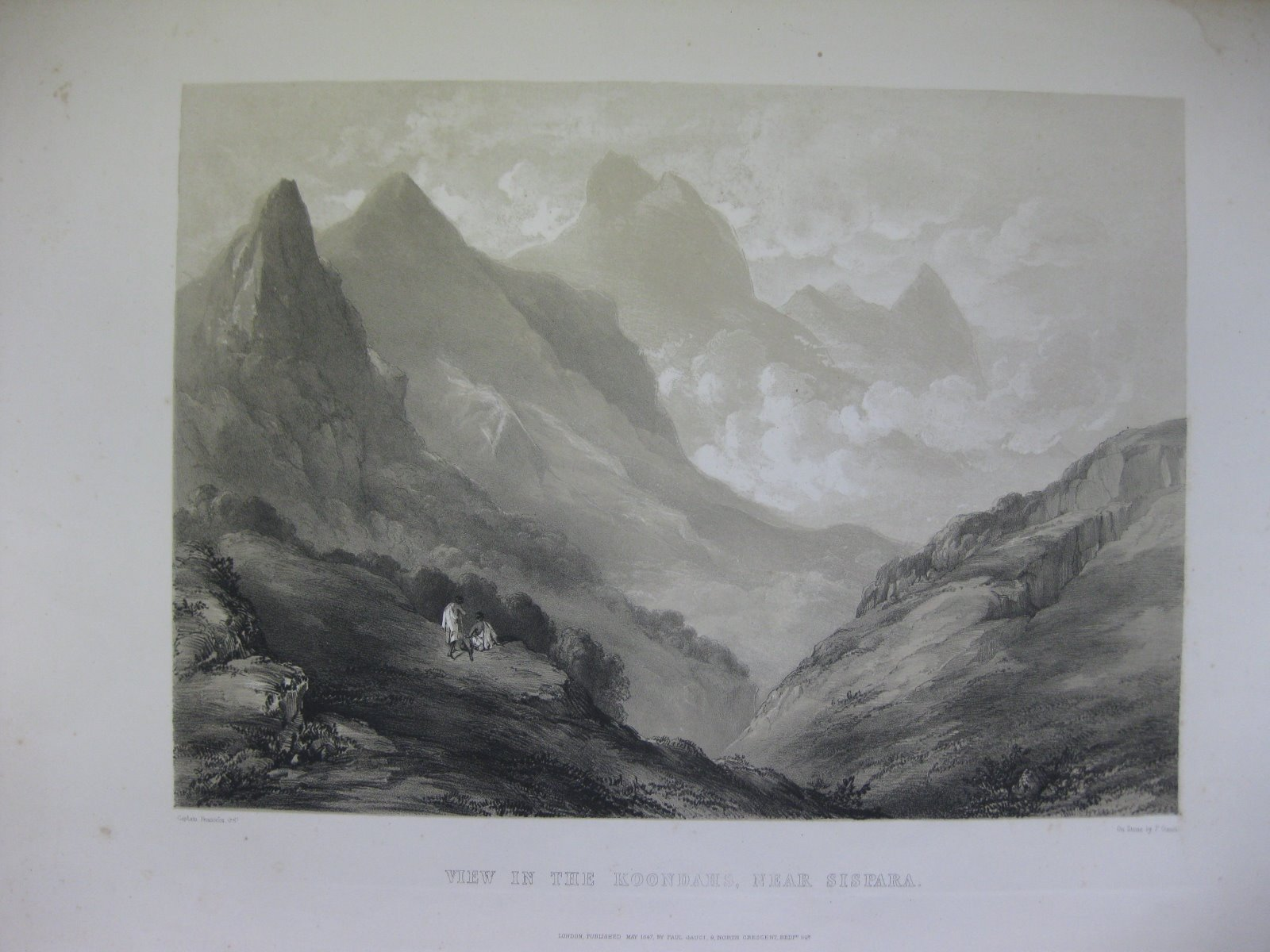
View in the Koondahs, near Sispara

An entire set of 16, tinted and uncoloured, are part of the Raj Bhavan art collection in Ooty.

In June 1996, a partial set of 14 plates was sold by Christie's at auction for £863 ($1,335).

The lithos of Peacocke are not in Travel in Aquatint & Lithography by the late Maj. John Roland Abbey.

(*) On 19–31 August 2009 nine of these lithographs, from the private collection of V. Narayan Swami, were displayed in the exhibition of rare, unique and never-before-seen etchings, engravings & aquatints: "Madras: From the City to the Presidency" at the Vennirul Art Gallery, C.P. Art Centre by the C.P. Ramaswami Aiyar Foundation, Chennai, Tamil Nadu.

== Later life ==
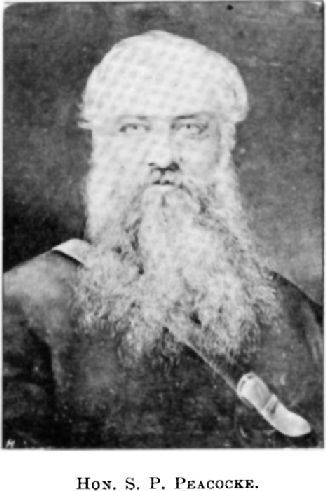
Stephen Ponsonby Peacocke in New Zealand c. 1870

After a period in Madeira, the Peacockes immigrated to New Zealand from England in 1858 and founded a strong and continuing lineage in New Zealand and Australia. After a short stay in the province of Canterbury they moved to Auckland in 1859. By 1860, Peacocke had bought some land near the Pensioner Settlement of Howick, East Tāmaki, and remained settled there for the rest of his life. In 1860–1861 he was on the Auckland jury list as a retired field officer living at East Tāmaki.

When the New Zealand Wars broke out in the Waikato, Major Peacocke, as an ex-military officer, offered his services to the Government. He was given the rank of Lt. Colonel and command of the 3rd battalion of the Auckland Militia, during the Invasion of the Waikato. He commanded the district extending from Wairoa South to Ōtāhuhu, a line which at the beginning of the war was practically "the front", defended by Galloway's and St. John's redoubts.

After the war, in 1865, Colonel Peacocke (or Ponsonby as he was called) turned his attention to politics. He represented the Pensioner Settlements electorate on the Auckland Provincial Council from 2 November 1865 to 7 September 1869. He was a member of the provincial executive council in May 1867. He was called to the Legislative Council on 8 May 1866 and attended several sessions of Parliament in Wellington, where he became known as a polished and effective speaker. He served as Commissioner of Crown Lands between 1867 and 1868. He continued to be a member of the Legislative Council, but his membership lapsed due to non-attendance and his final date of membership is the same as his death date.

Isabella Peacocke died on 12 March 1872 and Stephen Peacocke died just over two months later at Howick on 29 May 1872. They are both buried in All Saints Churchyard, Howick, New Zealand. The headstone over their grave reads: "In death they were not divided".

== External sources ==
- Ponsonby and Peacocke, Genealogy Message Board
