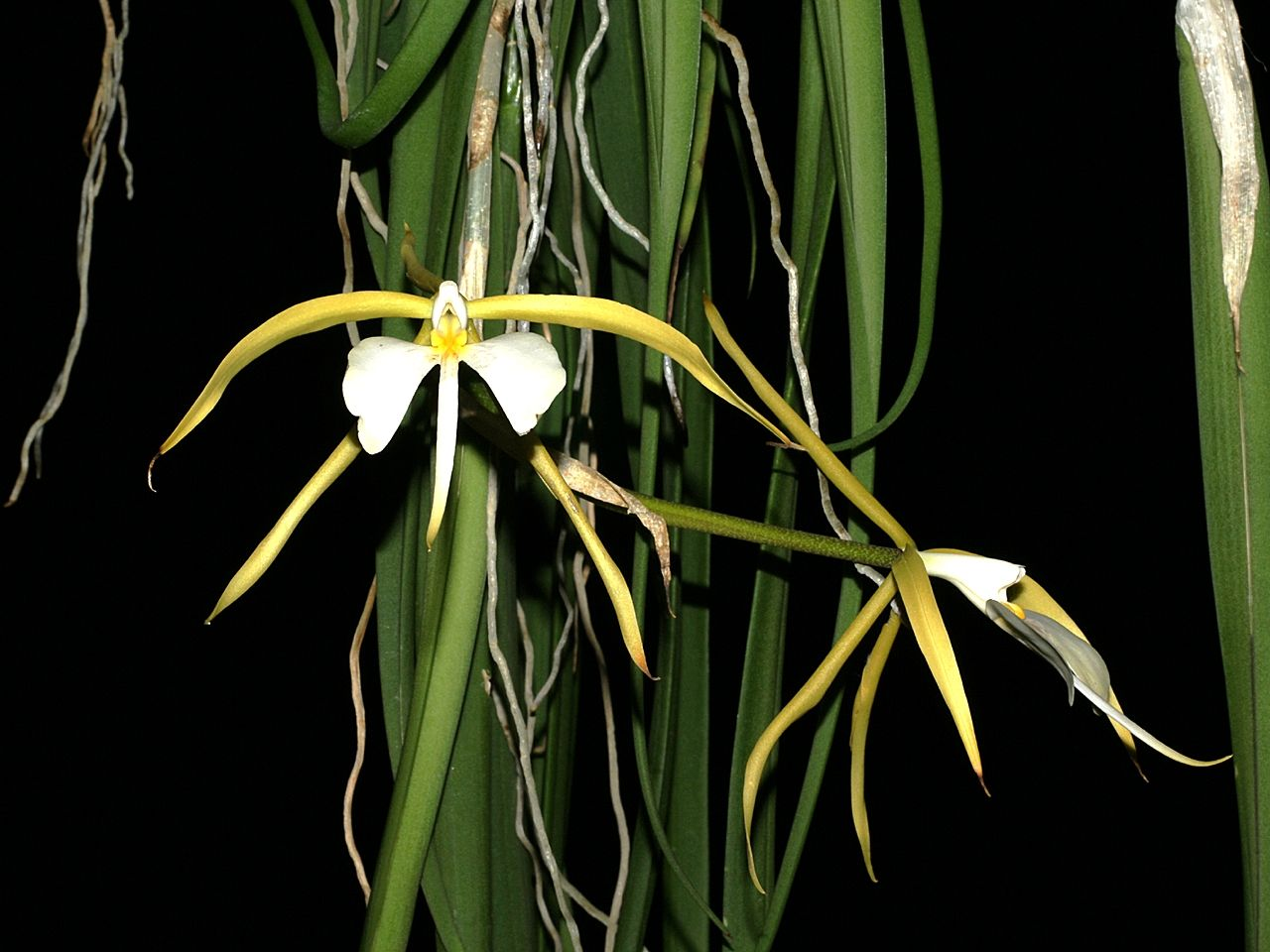

Scientific classification
- Kingdom: Plantae
- Clade: Tracheophytes
- Clade: Angiosperms
- Clade: Monocots
- Order: Asparagales
- Family: Orchidaceae
- Subfamily: Epidendroideae
- Tribe: Epidendreae
- Subtribe: Laeliinae
- Genus: Epidendrum
- Species: E. parkinsonianum

Binomial name
- Epidendrum parkinsonianum Hook.

Synonyms
- Brassavola pescatorii Rchb.f.; Coilostylis parkinsoniana (Hook.) Withner & P.A.Harding; Coilostylis pugioniformis (Regel) D.P.Banks; Epidendrum aloifolium Bateman, nom. illeg.; Epidendrum falcatum var. zeledoniae Schltr.; Epidendrum pugioniforme Regel

= Epidendrum parkinsonianum =

Species of orchid

Epidendrum parkinsonianum, synonym Coilostylis parkinsoniana, is an epiphytic species of orchid, native to Mexico and Central America.
