= Bee orchid =

Bee orchid is a common name for several orchids and may refer to:

- Cottonia peduncularis, a species of orchid from India and Sri Lanka
- Diuris carinata, a species of orchid from the south-west of Western Australia
- Ida barringtoniae, a species of orchid in the genus Ida, found in Puerto Rico
- Ophrys, a European genus of terrestrial orchids
- Ophrys apifera, a species in the genus Ophrys, and the species from which the genus was given its English name
