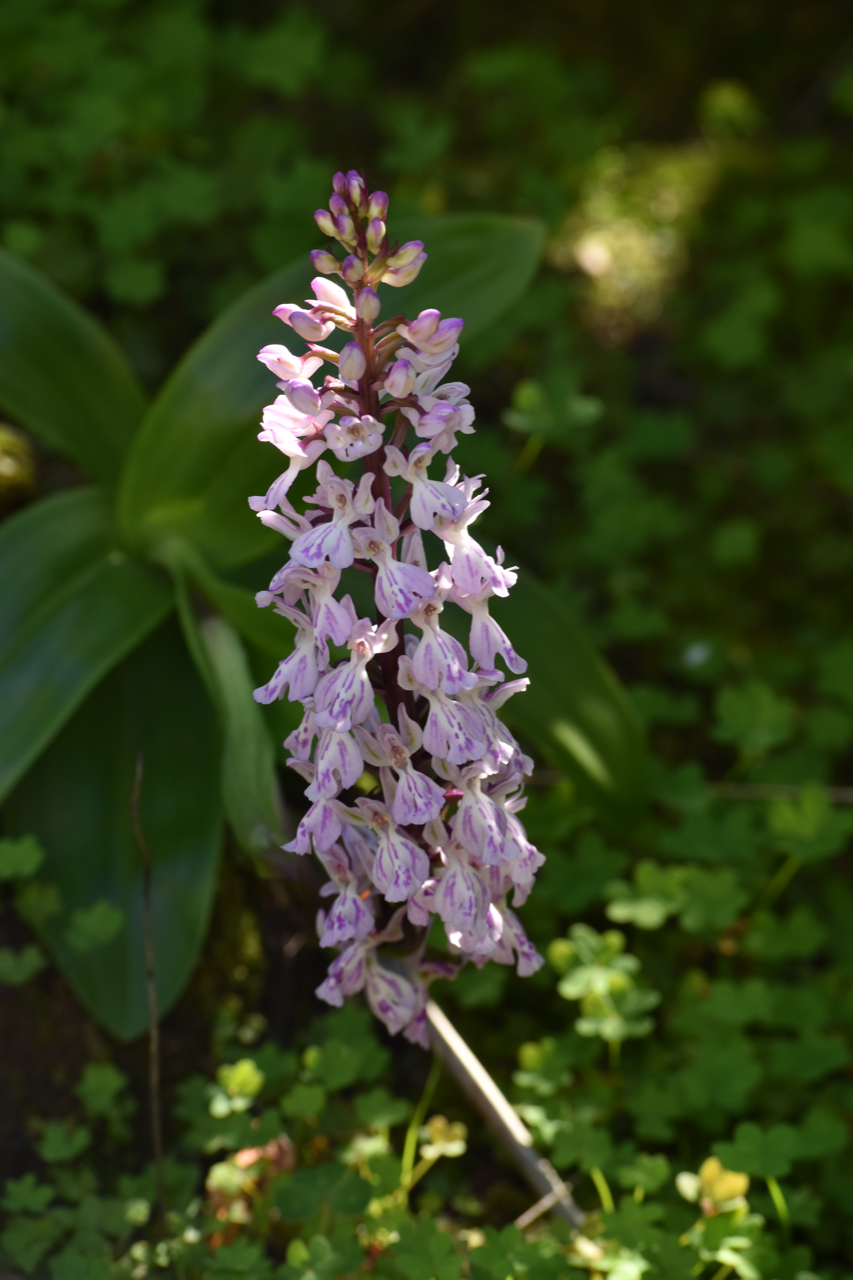

Scientific classification
- Kingdom: Plantae
- Clade: Tracheophytes
- Clade: Angiosperms
- Clade: Monocots
- Order: Asparagales
- Family: Orchidaceae
- Subfamily: Orchidoideae
- Genus: Orchis
- Species: O. canariensis

Binomial name
- Orchis canariensis Lindl.

= Orchis canariensis =

Species of flowering plant

Orchis canariensis is a species of orchid endemic to the Canary Islands.

== Description ==
Previously described as a subspecies of Orchis patens, it is now accepted as a separate species also supported by a molecular study that has highlighted a significant genetic difference between the two taxa.

Orchis canriensis is a bulbous geophyte, which grows to 30 cm (12 in) basal leaves are wide, ovate, dark green and slightly shiny, and never spotted. Flower stems are green to reddish-purple. Flowers are lilac or pink, sometimes green in the central part of the sepal, with purple markings on the lower lips.

Seeds are clavate with 5 to 7 cells in the longitudinal axis. Seeds showed straight to sinuous anticlinal walls and no ornamentations in the periclinal walls. Seed length is around 300–350 μm (0.012–0.014 in) and width 150–200 μm (0.0059–0.0079 in).

== Biology ==
Orchis canariensis associates with the mycorrhizal fungus Tulasnella helicospora

The chromosome number of Orchis canariensis is 2n=84

== Distribution and habitats ==
Orchis canariensis occurs in five out of seven Canary Islands (Spain), with the exception of Lanzarote and Fuerteventura.

It usually grows in rocky walls with mossy shelves with accumulation of litter and pine needles or in pine forests, generally occurring between 500 and 1,300 m altitude.

== Conservation ==
Orchis canariensis is currently listed together with O. patens as “Endangered” in the European IUCN Red List
