= El Valle de Antón =

Town in Panama

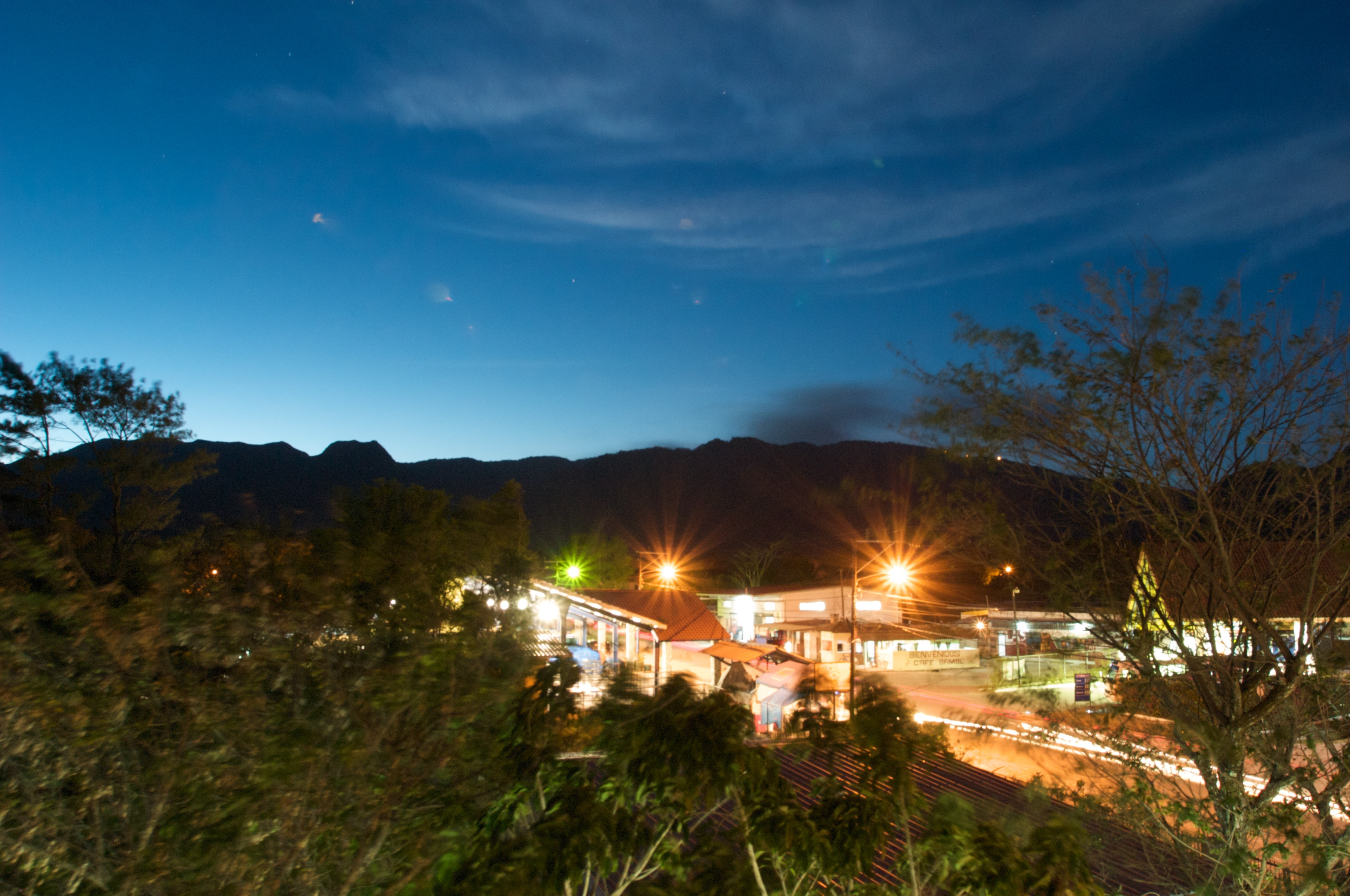
- El Valle at night

- Location within Panama
- Coordinates: 8.6008°N 80.1303°W
- Country: Panama
- Province: Coclé

Area
  - Land: 34.8 km^{2} (13.4 sq mi)

Population (2010)
  - Total: 7,602
  - Density: 218.6/km^{2} (566/sq mi)
- Population density calculated based on land area.

El Valle de Antón, generally called El Valle, or Anton's Valley in English, is a town of 7,600 in the Coclé province of Panama.

== Geography ==
The town is located in the flat wide caldera of the 6 km wide El Valle volcano that is inactive; there is evidence that it erupted as recently as about 300,000 years ago

Aerial drone view of the town

== Environment ==
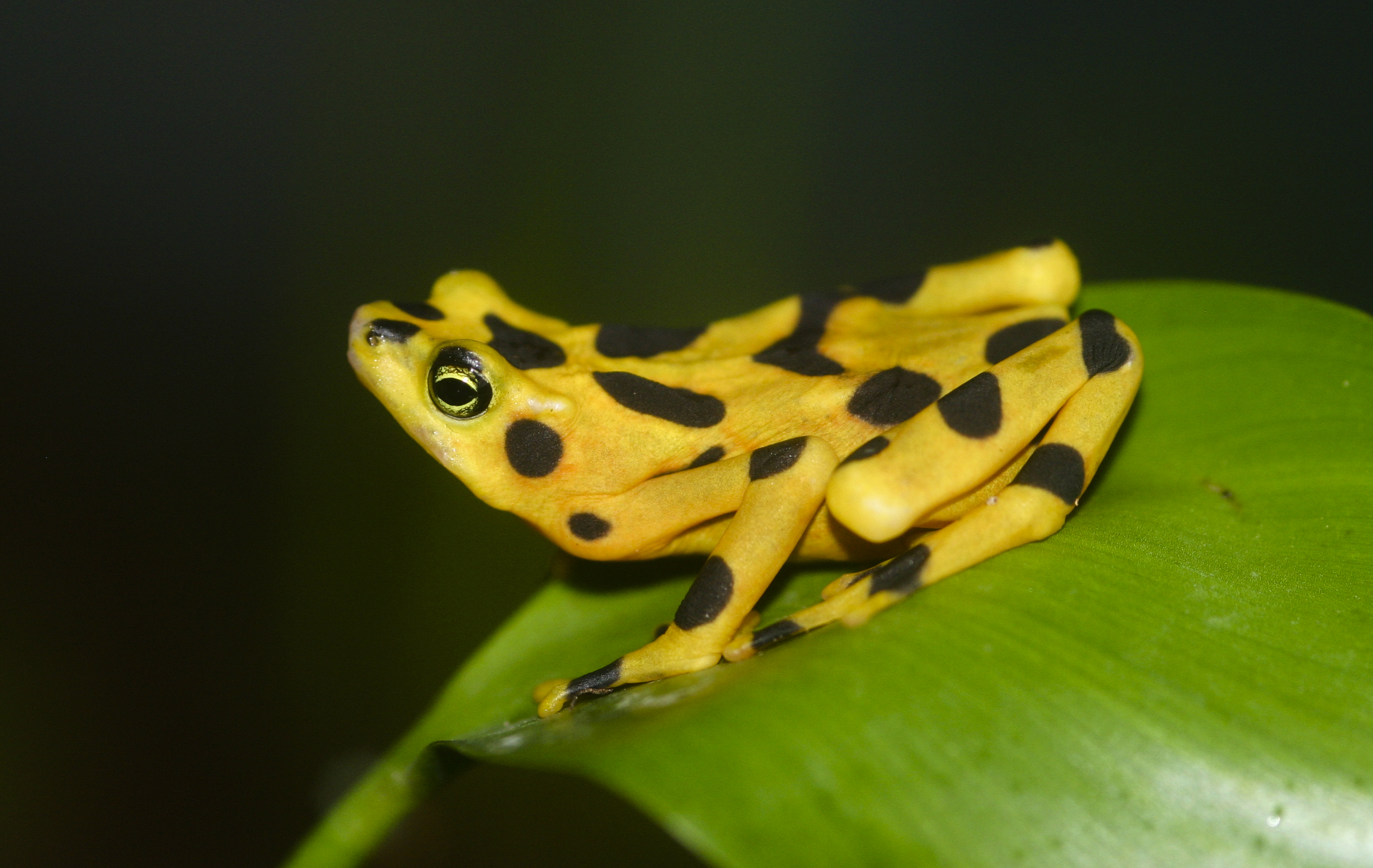
Panamanian golden frog, critically endangered

Because of its elevation (600 m), the area is cooler than the Panamanian lowlands. Natural attractions near El Valle include the Chorro El Macho waterfall, Las Mozas waterfall, the "square" trees behind Hotel Campestre, and a group of small thermal pools (which consist of three cement pools of mineralized water that varies in color depending on the specific minerals present at a given moment). The area around the town is also known for being one of the last habitats of the critically endangered Panamanian golden frog. Some of the forests around the town are protected areas.

=== Important Bird Area ===
El Valle is home to around 500 species of birds. A 10,600 ha site encompassing the forests and volcanic peaks north of the town, forming the upper watersheds of several rivers, has been designated an Important Bird Area (IBA) by BirdLife International because it supports significant populations of black guans, olive-sided flycatchers and golden-winged warblers.

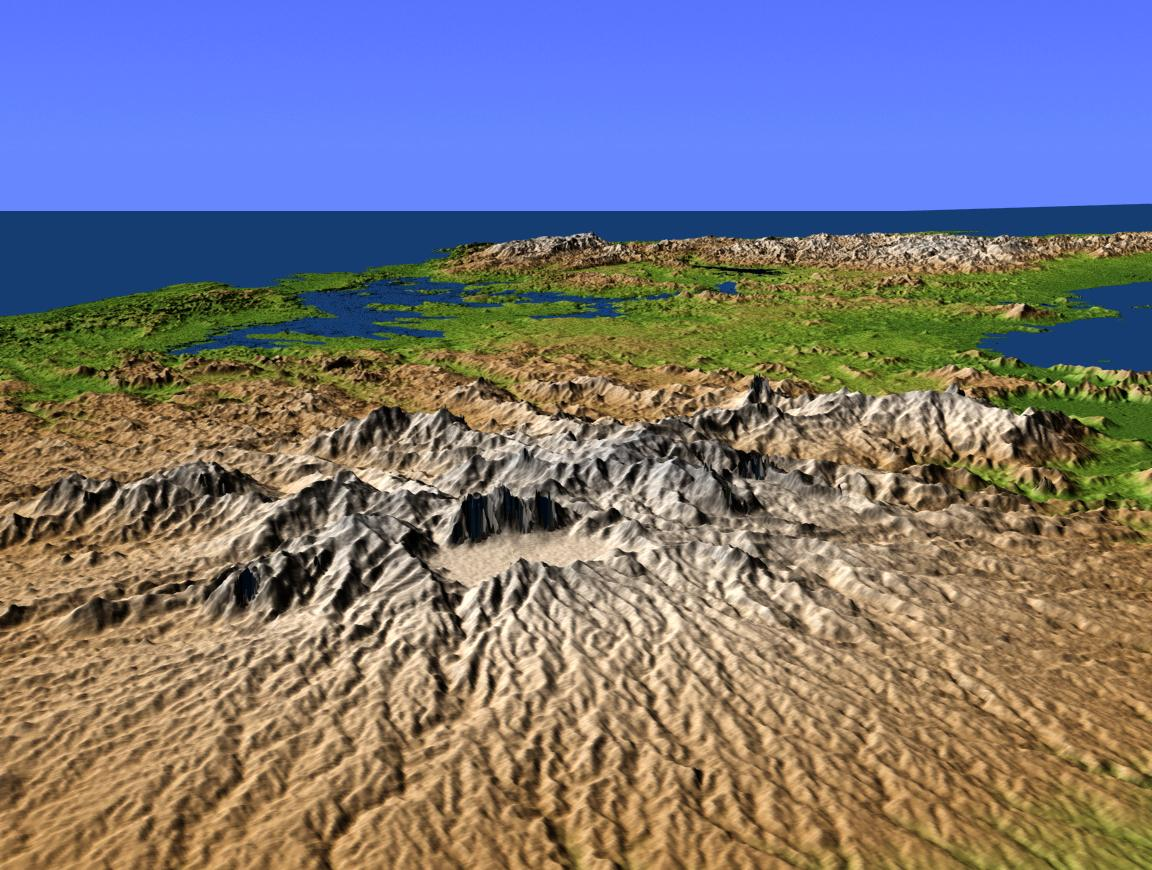
Perspective view with color-coded shaded relief of Central Panama from the south-west, with El Valle in the foreground

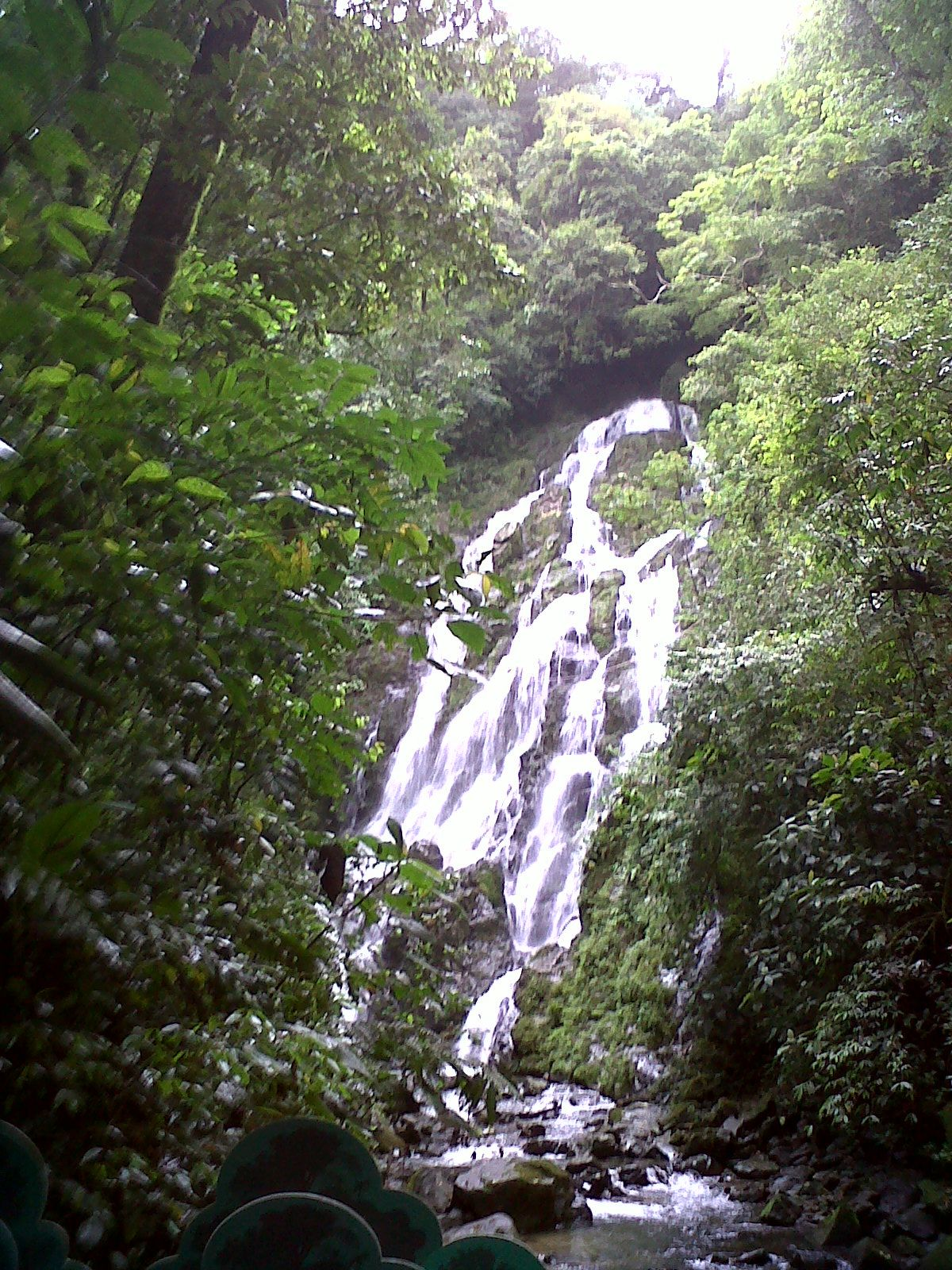
Waterfall "El Macho" in El Valle

== Demographics ==
El Valle had a population of 7,602 as of 2010. In 2000 its population was 6,175; in 1990 it was 4,900.

== Features ==
El Valle has one main road, called Avenida Central or Calle Central, which runs east–west across the town. A main landmark is the town's public market, which is open seven days a week, although it is sometimes referred to as El Valle's Sunday Market. El Valle has a very small historical and geological museum, as well as a small zoo (El Nispero, named after a type of tree), a small serpentarium, a butterfly house, and an orchid conservation center, called APROVACA, which displays over 100 native local orchid species. There are also several petroglyphs west of town that are known as La Piedra Pintada.

Some of the people who own properties in the heart of El Valle are wealthy people from Panama City who use the area as their vacation or weekend home. Popular activities in the area include cycling, hiking, horseback riding, and birdwatching.

The town is about 25 km off the Interamerican Highway by a two-lane road. The road is generally in good condition, with a few potholes that are repaired regularly. Buses, usually mini-buses, to Panama City are frequent and take approximately 2.5 hours. As of 2014, the last direct bus to Panama City leaves El Valle at 3pm with a fare of $4.25. To reach other locations in Panama, it is generally necessary to take a bus to San Carlos and transfer there. As of 2014, the last bus from El Valle to San Carlos leaves at 6pm.

== Sources ==
=== Works cited ===
- Friar, William. Panama. Moon Publications (2008). ISBN 1-59880-085-X.
- Reid, Robert et al. Central America on a shoestring. Lonely Planet (2007). ISBN 1-74104-596-7.
