= APROVACA =

APROVACA (Spanish Asociación de Productores de Orquídeas de El Valle y Cabuya) is a non-profit organization established to conserve and protect native orchids in El Valle de Antón, Panama.

The organization was founded on May 15, 2001 with the goal of protecting endangered endemic Panamanian species of orchids. Illegal orchid poaching by locals have greatly diminished the number of orchids in El Valle and threatens to eradicate several species of orchids only found in El Valle.

The headquarters of APROVACA is in El Valle de Antón. Aside from administration the center has an orchid garden and a nursery for local orchids and horticultural varieties.

As an ongoing project APROVACA is collaborating with the Institute of Agricultural Investigation of Panama (Instituto de Investigación Agropecuaria de Panamá, IDIAP) to reintroduce endemic local orchids into their natural habitats.

Since March 2010 APROVACA has been a member of the Orchid Conservation Coalition.
