= El Valle (volcano) =

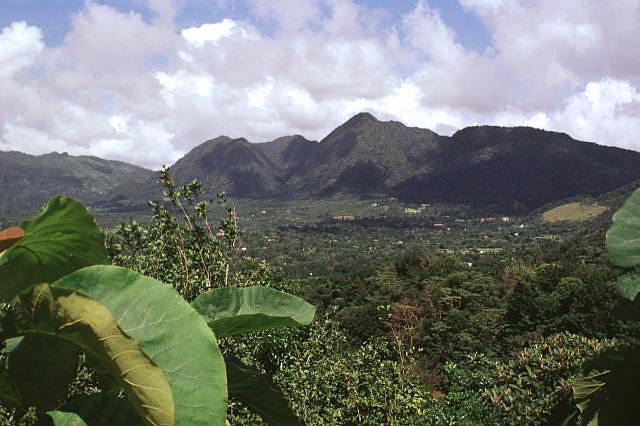
- El Valle in 1998

Highest point
- Elevation: 1,185 m (3,888 ft)
- Coordinates: 8°34′48″N 80°10′12″W

Geography
- Location within Panama
- Location: Panama

Geology
- Mountain type: Stratovolcano
- Volcanic arc: Central America Volcanic Arc
- Last eruption: Unknown

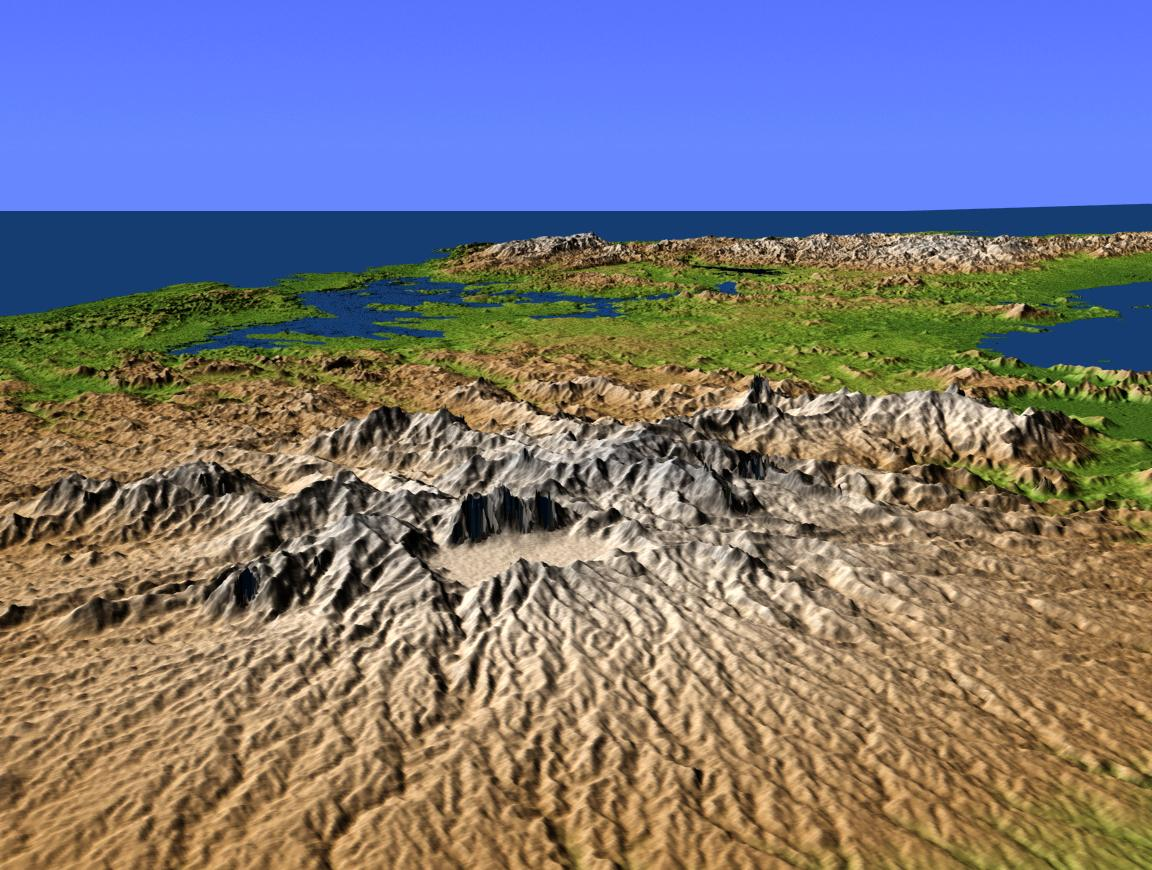
Perspective view with color-coded shaded relief of Central Panama from the southwest, with El Valle in the foreground

El Valle is a stratovolcano in central Panama and is the easternmost volcano along the Central American Volcanic Arc which has been formed by the subduction of the Nazca Plate below Central America. Some time prior to 200,000 years ago, the volcano underwent a huge eruption event that caused the top of the volcano to collapse into the empty magma chamber below forming a large caldera. Several lava domes have developed inside the caldera since the collapse—forming Cerro Pajita, Cerro Gaital and Cerro Caracoral peaks. Prior to research in the early 1990s, it was thought that no active volcanism existed within Panama. But radioactive dates from El Valle show that the volcano last erupted as recently as 200,000 years ago.

Work by de Boer et al. and Defant et al. of other volcanoes within Panama have shown that there are two episodes of volcanism—young (< 2.5 million years ago) and old (> 4.5 million years ago) groups. The young volcanism consists of adakites (slab melts) whereas the older volcanism appears to be normal calc-alkaline volcanism.

== See also ==
- List of volcanoes in Panama
- El Valle de Antón, a nearby town
- APROVACA
