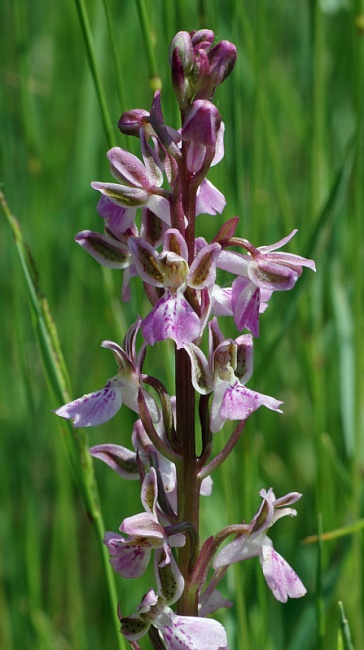
- Flower of Orchis patens

Scientific classification
- Kingdom: Plantae
- Clade: Embryophytes
- Clade: Tracheophytes
- Clade: Angiosperms
- Clade: Monocots
- Order: Asparagales
- Family: Orchidaceae
- Subfamily: Orchidoideae
- Genus: Orchis
- Species: O. patens

Binomial name
- Orchis patens Desf.

= Orchis patens =

Species of plant

Orchis patens is a species of orchid found from the central Mediterranean to northwestern Africa.

== Description ==
It is a bulbous geophytic herbaceous plant, with a stem from 20 to 50 cm high, green in color, turning towards the purplish brown in the upper part.

The basal leaves, from 3 to 7, are united in a rosette and lanceolate, up to 20 cm long, sometimes light-brown spotted; those cauline, from 1 to 3, are smaller and sheath the stem; the narrow bracts are purplish-red in color.

The pink to lilac flowers are gathered in dense, roughly cylindrical inflorescences. The concave lateral sepals have a central greenish area spotted with purple; the median sepal is folded like a helmet on the petals, which are also greenish in the center. The labellum is trilobed, purplish pink with a lighter area at the base, with a 10–14 mm long dotted median lobe, with a roughly indented margin. The spur is conical, horizontal with a slightly descending apex, 6–8 mm long.

It flowers between April and May.

The seed shape is clavate with short basal and apical cells, while the medial cells are elongated. The pericline walls are smooth, as the ornaments are absent, and the anticline walls are sinuous / wavy. The number of cells along the longitudinal axis is between five and eight (usually seven). The average length of the seeds is about 400 μm.

== Biology ==
The germination of Orchis patens seeds has been shown to be induced by the interaction with the mycorrhizal fungus Tulasnella helicospora.

The chromosome number of Orchis patens is 2n = 84.

== Distribution and habitats ==
It has a very fragmented range that includes North Africa (Algeria and Tunisia) and Italy, where it is currently present only in eastern Liguria; in the past it was also observed in Sicily near Palermo (described by Vincenzo Tineo as Orchis panormitana) but the latter could be an incorrect identification. Recently, a genetic study on Mediterranean populations has highlighted a significant genetic difference between the African population (originally described by Desfontaines in 1799) and the Italian population which can be considered a different subspecies, Orchis patens subsp. brevicornis.

It grows preferentially on acid soils, in olive groves, chestnut and oak clearings, meadows, along the edges of cultivated land, in full light or in semi-shade, from sea level up to 1500 m of altitude.

== Conservation ==
Due to its narrow range, the Mediterranean IUCN Red List classifies Orchis patens as "Vulnerable".

The species was chosen as the flagship species for the LIFEorchids conservation project co-financed by the LIFE programme of the European Union.
