= Orchid Conservation Coalition =

- Founded: August 2, 2005; 21 years ago San Francisco, California
- Founder: Mark Sullivan
- Type: Non-profit
- Purpose: Orchid conservation
- Location: Internet
- Region served: World wide
- Method: raising money, networking, education
- Website: orchidconservationcoalition.org livingorchidcollection.org

The Orchid Conservation Coalition (OCC) is a grassroots organization made up of people, orchid societies, and orchid businesses dedicated to raising awareness and money for orchid conservation.

== Programs of the Orchid Conservation Coalition ==
1% for Orchid Conservation (1%FOC) Orchid Societies and businesses that participate in 1% FOC commit to budget 1% or more of their net revenue towards in situ orchid conservation projects of their choice.

Living Orchid Collection (LOC) The primary purpose of LOC is to have an organized, virtual, living orchid species collection.

Habitat Loss, Preservation, and Restoration web pages Articles and photos to educate and raise awareness for orchid conservation.

Orchid Conservation Articles Free download able articles for use in magazines and newsletters to educate and raise awareness for orchid conservation.

== Organizational structure ==
The Orchid Conservation Coalition's structure is unique for a non-profit. It does not take contributions or distribute money itself. The member organizations in the coalition give directly towards orchid conservation. There is no fee to participate in the OCC. There are no board members. There are no decisions to be made because the organization is structured around agreements, and no money coming in to account for. No money means no need to incorporate. No donations accepted means no tax status. The OCC was structured this way to eliminate cost and to direct energy and money directly to orchid conservation.

The Orchid Conservation Coalition is a coalition of orchid societies, businesses, and non profit conservation organizations. The keyword is coalition. The coalition revolves around a set of agreements which are opt in or opt out. For orchid societies and small businesses the agreements are good faith. All the decision making is left to the boards of participating orchid societies and the small business owners. For large businesses, the agreement is a legally binding agreement. For non profit conservation organizations the agreement is good faith with the understanding that the organization will be transparent with the funds received through 1% for Orchid Conservation and update participants with their progress.

The Orchid Conservation Coalition does not have a physical space beyond its internet site.

== Current Participants ==
Orchid Societies: San Francisco Orchid Society, Orchid Species Society of Western Australia, New Hampshire Orchid Society, Bucks County Orchid Society, Slipper Orchid Alliance, Native Orchid Conference, Boulder Orchid Society, Orchid Society of Southern California, Illinois Orchid Society, Orchid Growers' Guild, Portland Orchid Society, Denver Orchid Society, Spokane Orchid Society, and the Greater Cincinnati Orchid Society.

Businesses: Orchid Seedbank Project, The Calypso Orchid Company, and Spangle Creek Labs

== Orchids as a flagship species for conservation ==
Orchids are a good flagship species for habitat preservation because they are one of the largest groups of plants on earth with about 25,000 species. They are found on all continents, except for Antarctica. Orchids are niche habitat players and are often found in unique habitats. They are "canaries in a coal mine" for the health of such habitats. The general public has a degree of fascination for orchids. The flashiness of orchids helps to protect habitat of less "flashy" but equally endangered species that share the same habitat.

== History ==
The OCC is a non-profit coalition started in August 2005. The beginning members were of the Orchid Seedbank Project and the San Francisco Orchid Society. The Species Society of Western Australia joined shortly thereafter in 2005.

== See also ==
- Conservation movement
- Environmental movement
- Habitat destruction
- Orchidaceae
