= Diuris carinata =

Tall bee orchid

Scientific classification
- Kingdom: Plantae
- Clade: Tracheophytes
- Clade: Angiosperms
- Clade: Monocots
- Order: Asparagales
- Family: Orchidaceae
- Subfamily: Orchidoideae
- Tribe: Diurideae
- Genus: Diuris
- Species: D. carinata

Binomial name
- Diuris carinata Lindl.

Species of orchid

Diuris carinata, commonly known as the tall bee orchid, is a species of orchid that is endemic to the south-west of Western Australia. It has between four and six leaves and up to seven large, bright yellow flowers with reddish-brown markings.

== Description ==
Diuris carinata is a tuberous, perennial herb with between four and six erect leaves 100–200 mm (4–8 in) long and 3–6 mm (0.1–0.2 in) wide. Between two and seven bright yellow flowers with reddish brown markings, about 30 mm (1 in) long and 20–30 mm (0.8–1 in) wide are borne on a flowering stem 500–800 mm (20–30 in) tall. The dorsal sepal is angled upwards, 14–18 mm (0.6–0.7 in) long, 9–12 mm (0.4–0.5 in) wide and tapered. The lateral sepals turn downwards below the horizontal, 18–22 mm (0.7–0.9 in) long, 3.5–5 mm (0.1–0.2 in) wide. The petals are erect or curve backwards, 12–16 mm (0.5–0.6 in) long and 10–12 mm (0.4–0.5 in) wide on a blackish stalk 5–7 mm (0.2–0.3 in) long. The labellum is 15–18 mm (0.6–0.7 in) long and has three lobes. The centre lobe is egg-shaped to wedge-shaped, 12–16 mm (0.5–0.6 in) long and 11–14 mm (0.4–0.6 in) wide. The side lobes are 7–10 mm (0.3–0.4 in) long and 4–6 mm (0.16–0.24 in) wide and spread apart from each other. There are two parallel callus ridges 7–9 mm (0.3–0.4 in) long at the base of the mid-line of the labellum and outlined with reddish brown. Flowering occurs in October and November.

== Taxonomy and naming ==
Diuris carinata was first formally described by John Lindley in his 1840 book The Genera and Species of Orchidaceous Plants from a specimen collected by James Drummond near the Swan River. Its specific epithet (carinata) is a Latin word meaning "keeled", referring to the keel-like structure of parts of the flower.

== Distribution and habitat ==
The tall bee orchid is found between Gingin and Mount Barker in the Jarrah Forest biogeographical region where it grows with sedges in swampy areas.
