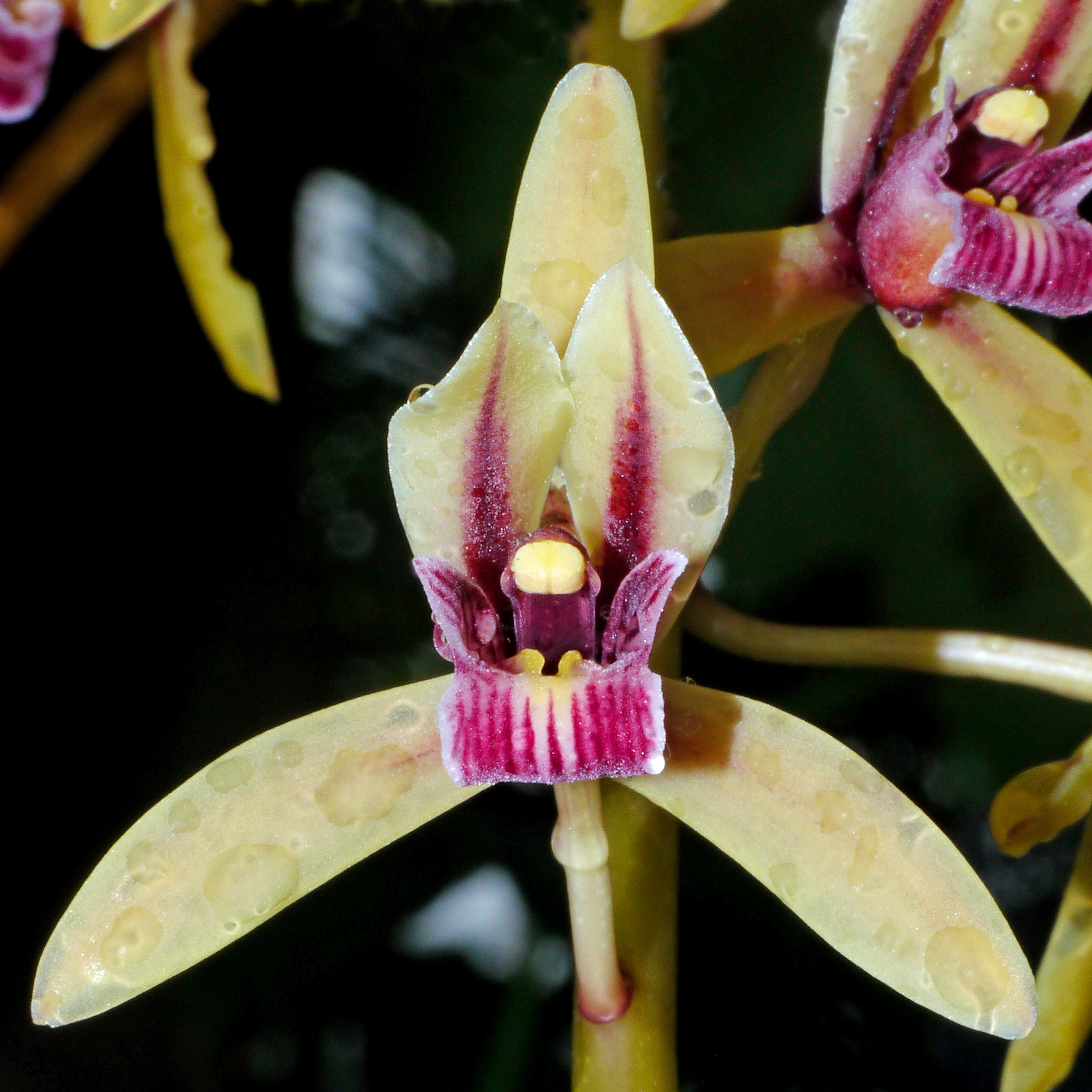
- Orchid flowers have 3 sepals and 3 petals, one modified as the lip or landing platform, as in this Cymbidium aloifolium.

Scientific classification
- Kingdom: Plantae
- Clade: Tracheophytes
- Clade: Angiosperms
- Clade: Monocots
- Order: Asparagales
- Family: Orchidaceae; Juss.

Type genus
- Orchis Tourn. ex L.

Subfamilies
- Apostasioideae Horaninov; Cypripedioideae Kosteletzky; Epidendroideae Kosteletzky; Orchidoideae Eaton; Vanilloideae Szlachetko
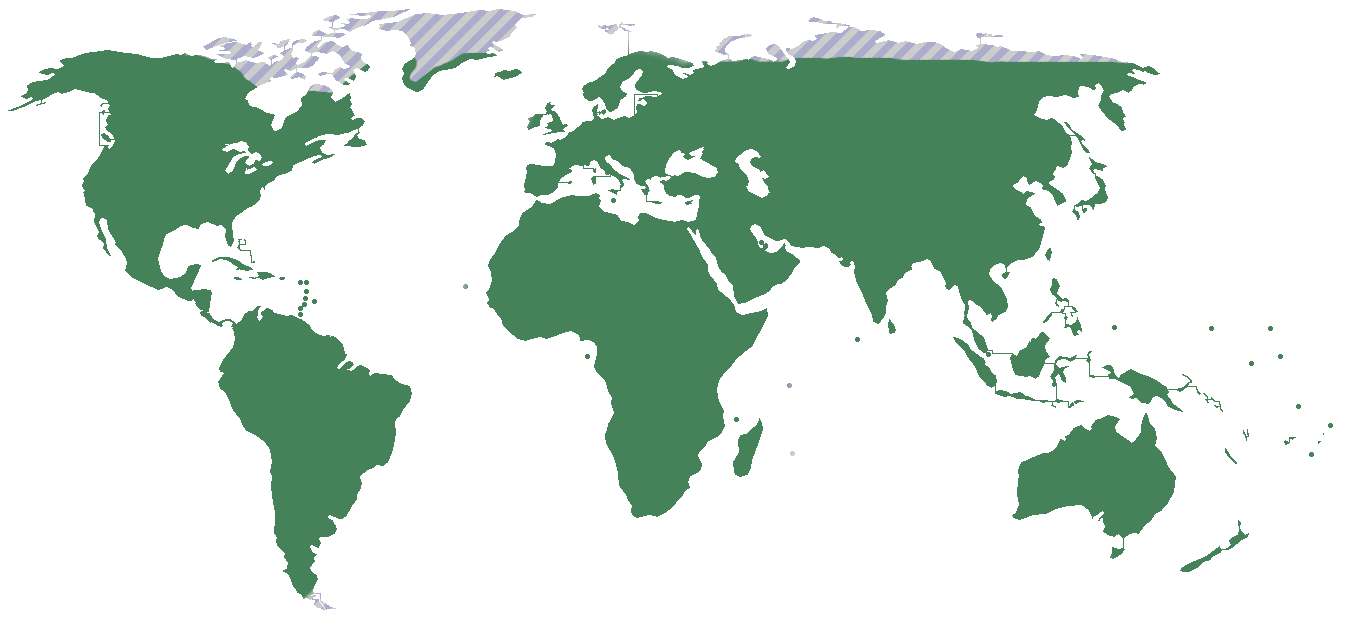
- Distribution range of family Orchidaceae

= Orchid =

Orchid Temporal range: 80–0 Ma Late Cretaceous – Present

Family of flowering plants in the order Asparagales

Orchids are plants that belong to the family Orchidaceae (/ˌɔːrkɪˈdeɪsi.iː, -si.aɪ/), a diverse and widespread group of flowering plants with blooms that are often colourful and fragrant. Orchids are cosmopolitan plants, living in diverse habitats on every continent except Antarctica. The world's richest diversity of orchid genera and species is in the tropics. Many species are epiphytes, living on trees. The flowers and their pollination mechanisms are highly specialized, attracting insect pollinators by colour, pattern, scent, pheromones, and sometimes by mimicking female insects. Orchids have very small seeds, relying on fungal partners for germination. Some orchids have no leaves, either photosynthesizing with their roots or relying entirely on fungal partners for food.

Orchidaceae is one of the two largest families of flowering plants. It contains about 28,000 currently accepted species in around 700 genera. That represents some 6–11% of all species of seed plants. Horticulturists run many orchid societies around the world; they have produced many hybrids and cultivars.

== Description ==
Orchids are easily distinguished from other plants, as most of them share some very evident derived characteristics or synapomorphies. Among these are: bilateral symmetry of the flower (zygomorphism), many resupinate flowers, a nearly always highly modified middle petal (labellum), stamens and carpels fused into a column, and extremely small seeds.

=== Stem and roots ===
All orchids are perennial herbs that lack any permanent woody structure. They can grow according to two patterns:

- Monopodial: The stem grows from a single bud, leaves are added from the apex each year, and the stem grows longer accordingly, as in Vanda.
- Sympodial: growth is at a front, with older growth behind, at a "back". Sympodial orchids may have swollen pseudobulbs.

Terrestrial (ground-living) orchids may have rhizomes or tubers. Epiphytic orchids, those that grow upon a support, have aerial roots. The older parts of the roots are covered with a velamen, a layer of dead cells.

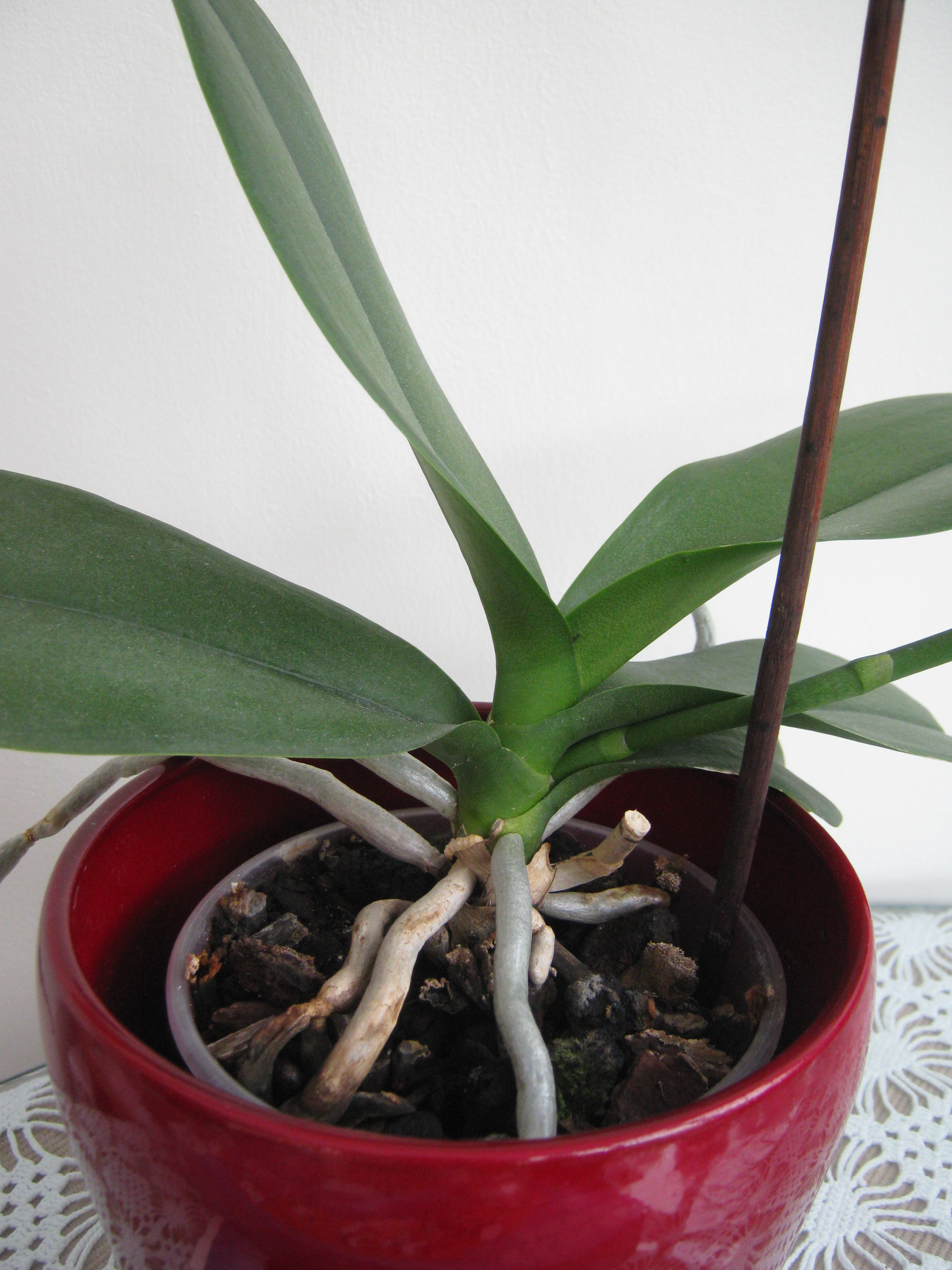
Monopodial: Phalaenopsis growing up from a single point

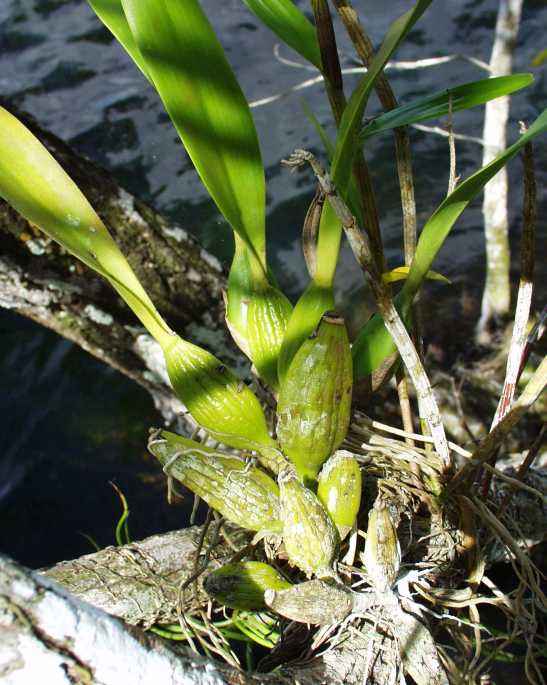
Sympodial: Prosthechea fragrans, pseudobulb from multiple internodes, leaves dying off at the back

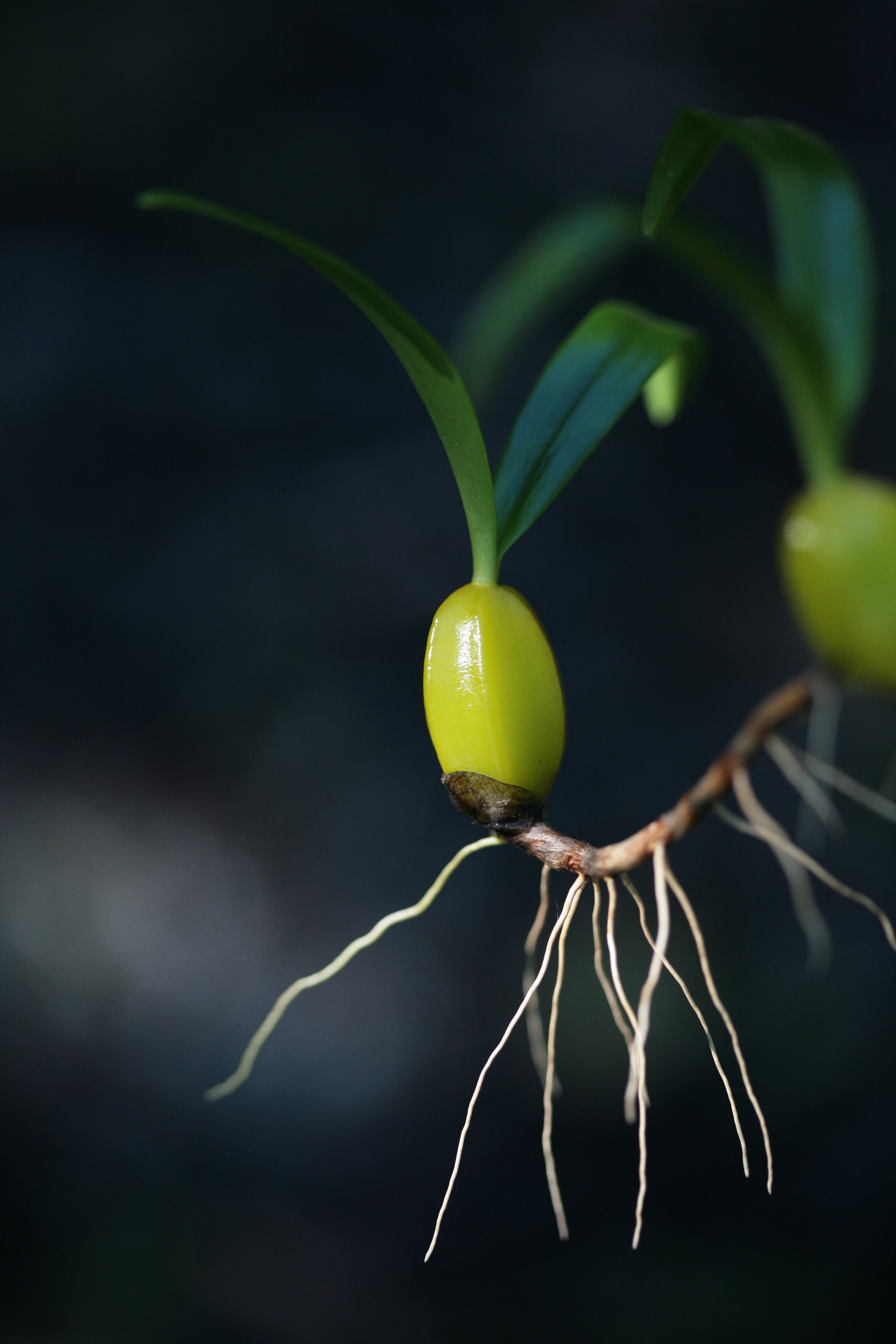
Pseudobulb of Bulbophyllum nutans, from a single internode of a sympodial plant

=== Leaves ===
Like most monocots, orchids usually have simple (untoothed) leaves with parallel veins. Some orchids such as Vanda are distichous, with their leaves arranged in two ranks on opposite sides of the stem. This is the arrangement at the base of all orchid shoots, though in many species the leaves higher up the shoot switch to a spiral phyllotaxis. Orchids are perennial; most species add new leaves at the apex while the oldest leaves gradually die off, but some such as Catasetum shed their leaves annually in the dry season, developing new leaves and new pseudobulbs each year.

Some epiphytic orchids, such as Taeniophyllum aphyllum, are leafless, depending on their green roots for photosynthesis. Other epiphytes like Phalaenopsis have leaves, but rely on photosynthesis in their green roots to prevent hypoxia (lack of oxygen) of the roots. Orchids of the genus Corallorhiza (coralroot orchids) have no leaves; instead they have symbiotic or parasitic associations with fungal mycelium, through which they absorb sugars.

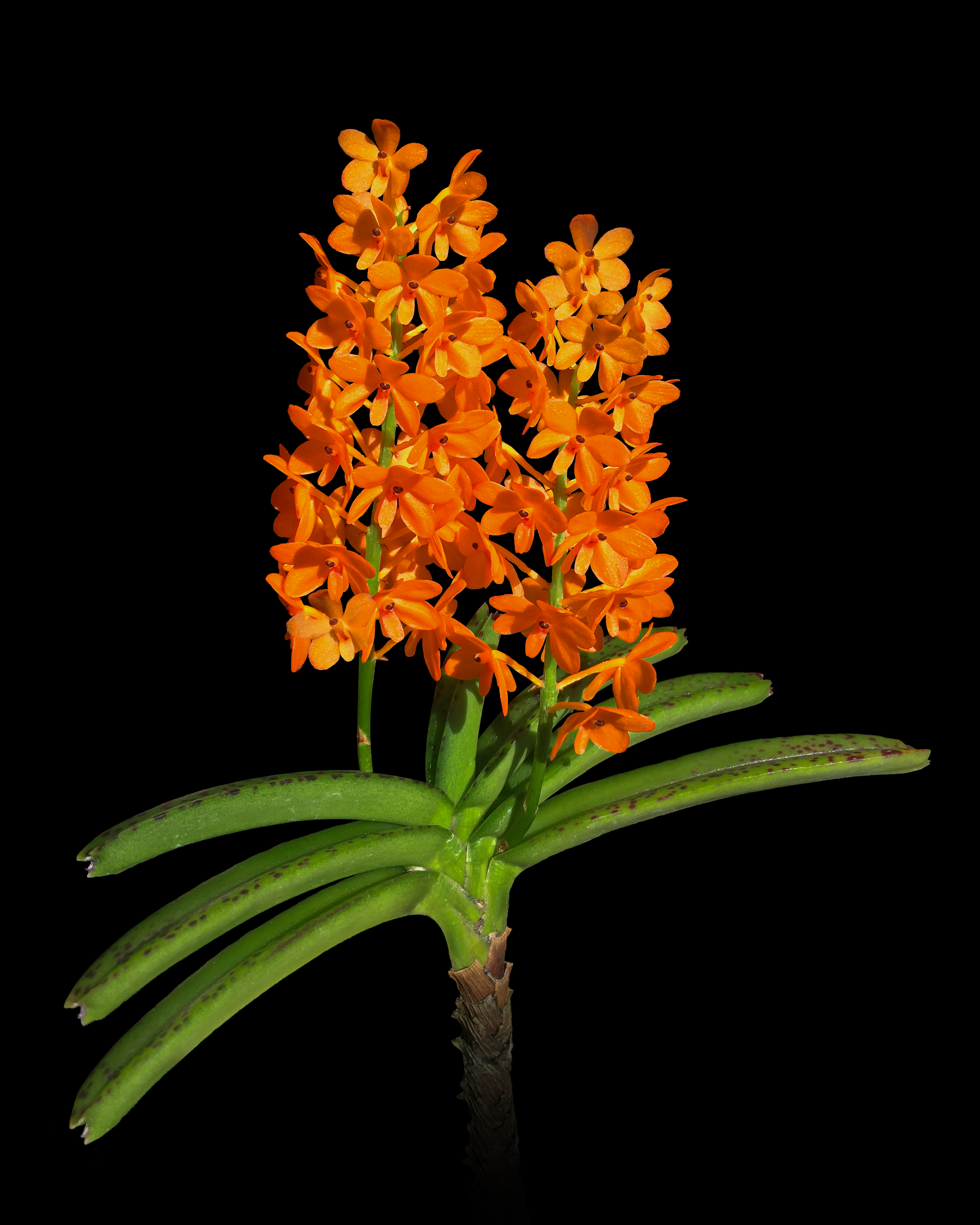
Leaves of Vanda are distichous, arranged in two opposite ranks.

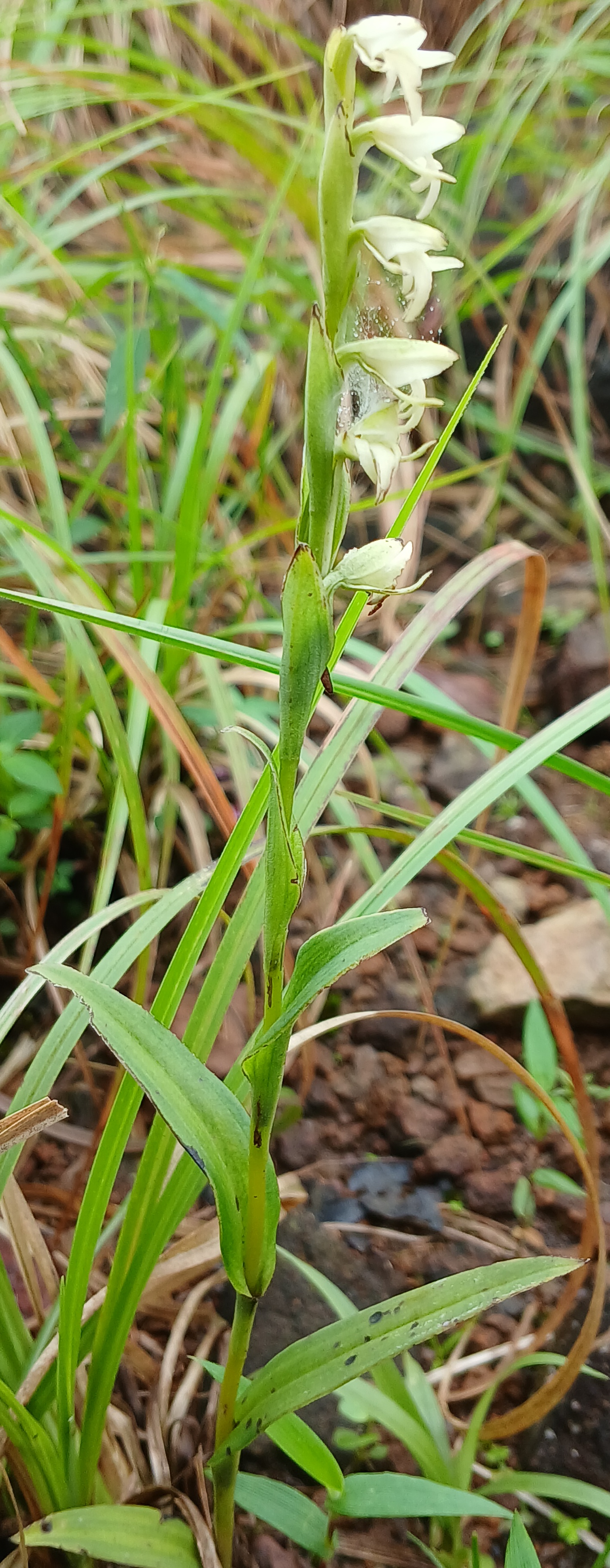
Most orchids have leaves arranged spirally up the stem.

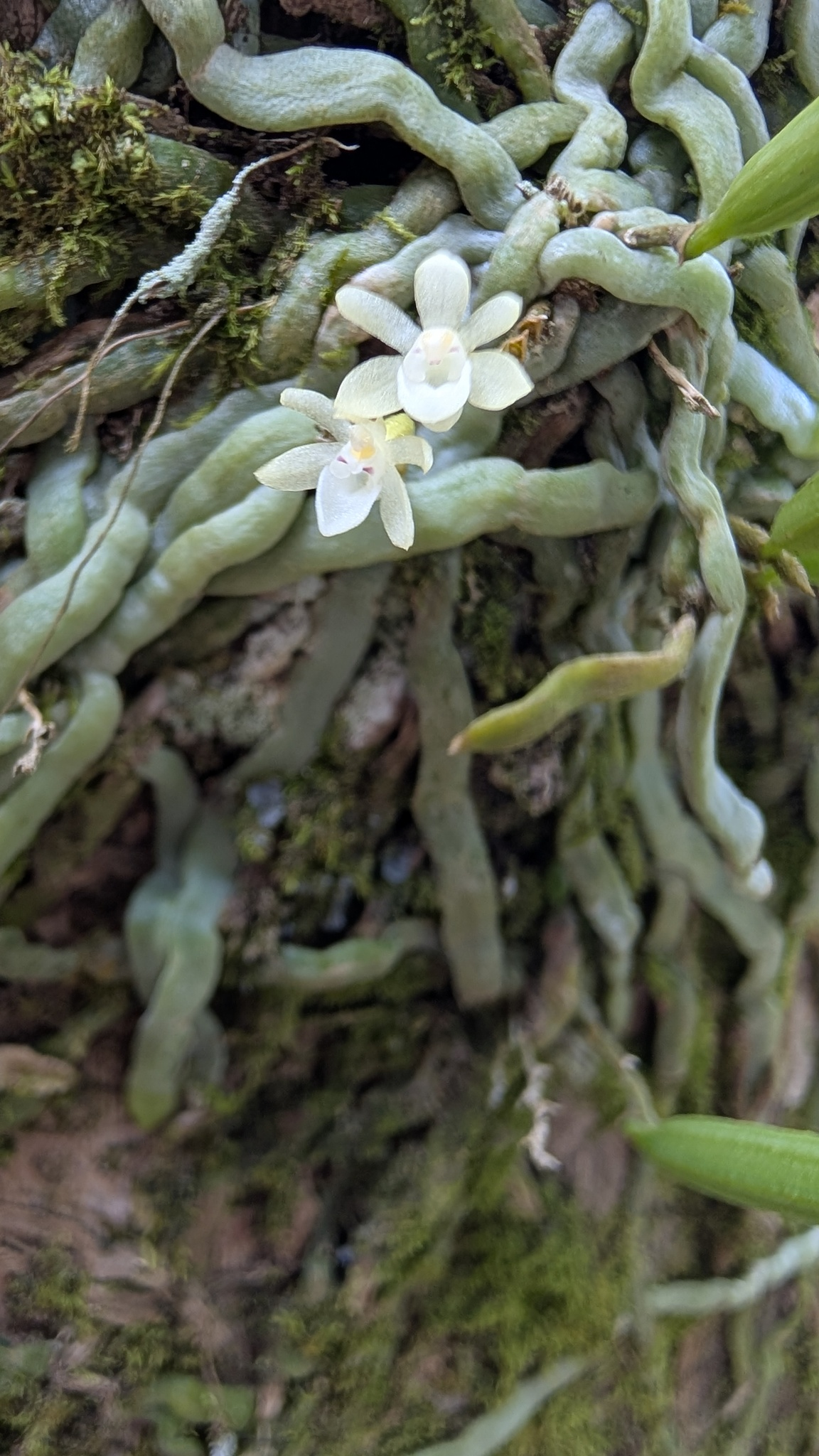
Taeniophyllum has green photosynthetic roots instead of leaves.

=== Flowers ===
Orchid flowers are very varied in form. They have three sepals, three petals and a three-chambered ovary. The three sepals and two of the petals are often similar to each other but one petal is usually highly modified, forming a "lip" or labellum. In most orchid genera, as the flower develops, it undergoes a twisting through 180°, called resupination, so that the labellum lies below the column. The labellum functions to attract insects, and in resupinate flowers, also acts as a landing stage, or sometimes a trap.

Floral morphology

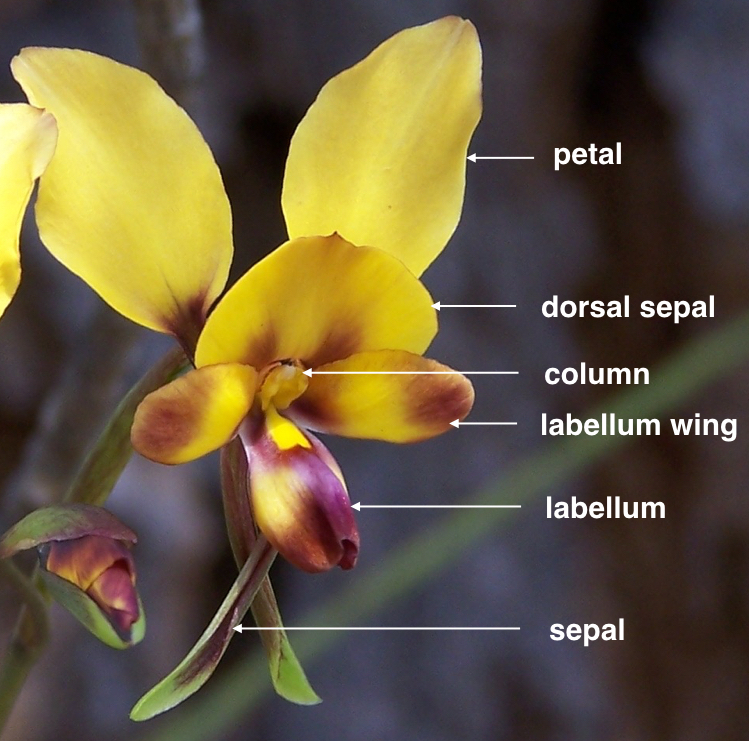
Diuris carinata

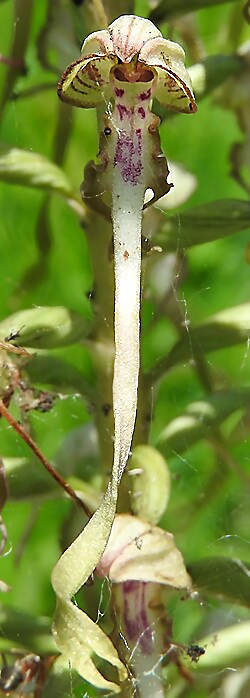
Himantoglossum hircinum,
highly modified labellum

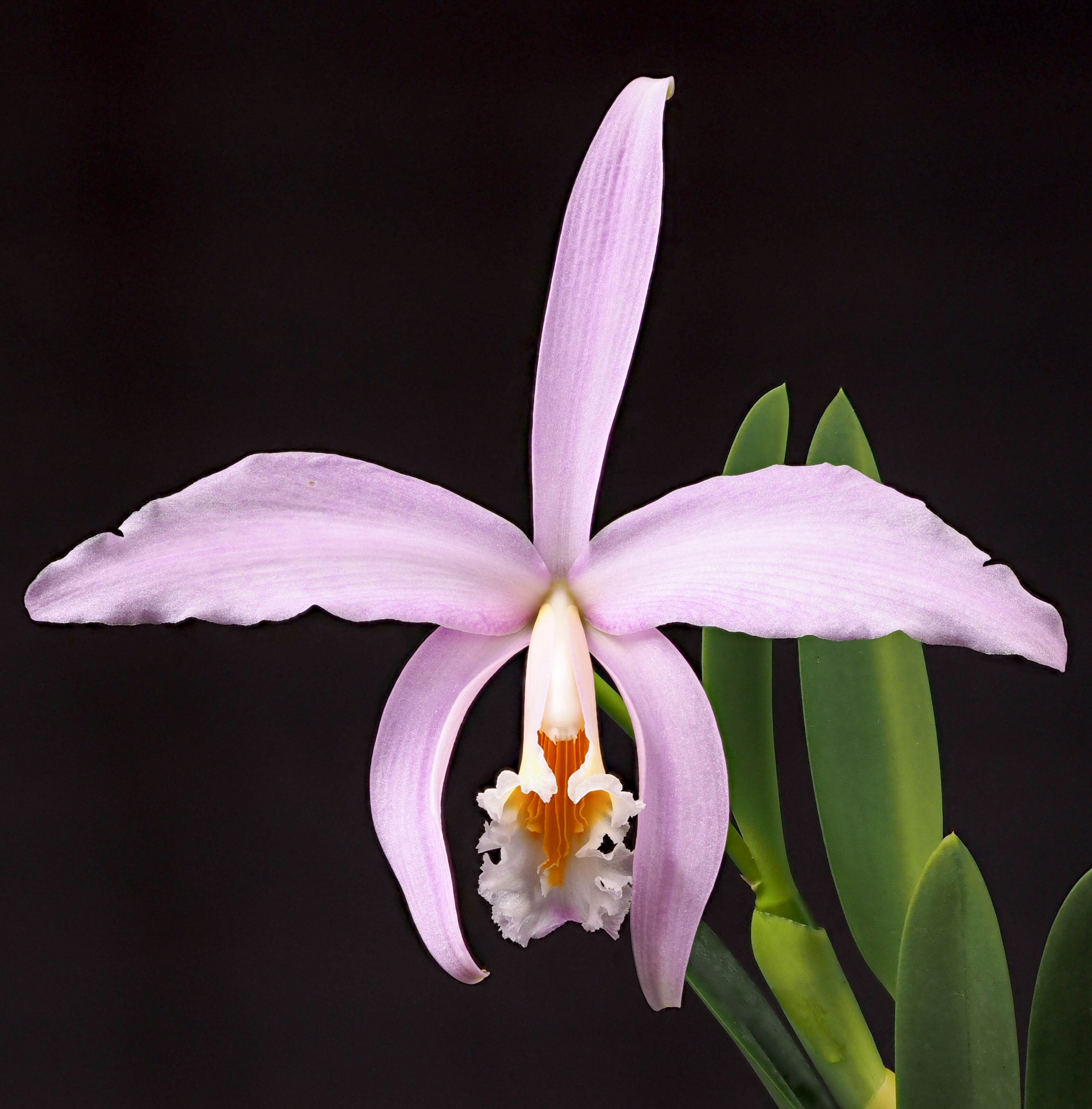
Cattleya jongheana

== Taxonomy ==
The genus Orchis was first formally described in 1753 by Carl Linnaeus in Species Plantarum from Joseph Pitton de Tournefort work. The genus name comes from the Ancient Greek ὄρχις (órkhis), literally meaning "testicle", because of the shape of the twin tubers in some species of Orchis. The term "orchid" was introduced in 1845 by John Lindley in School Botany, as a shortened form of Orchidaceae. In Middle English, the name bollockwort was used for some orchids, based on "bollock" meaning testicle and "wort" meaning plant.

== Reproduction ==
=== Pollination ===
Orchid reproductive anatomy, illustrated with a Brassia

Charles Darwin investigated the complex and varied mechanisms that orchids have evolved to achieve cross-pollination, and described these in his 1862 book Fertilisation of Orchids.

The reproductive parts of an orchid flower are unique in that the stamens and style are joined to form a single structure, the column.

Most orchids deliver pollen in a single mass, a pollinium (plural: pollinia), able to fertilise thousands of ovules. The pollinia are attached to a sticky disc near the top of the column. Just below the pollinia is a second, larger sticky plate, the stigma.

In orchids that produce pollinia, pollination happens as some variant of the following sequence: when the pollinator enters into the flower, it touches a viscidium, which promptly sticks to its body, generally on the head or abdomen. While leaving the flower, it pulls the pollinium out of the anther, as it is connected to the viscidium by the caudicle or stipe. The caudicle then bends and the pollinium is moved forwards and downwards. When the pollinator enters another flower of the same species, the pollinium is so placed that it sticks to the stigma of the second flower, pollinating it. In horticulture, artificial orchid pollination is achieved by removing the pollinia with a small instrument such as a toothpick from the pollen parent and transferring them to the seed parent.

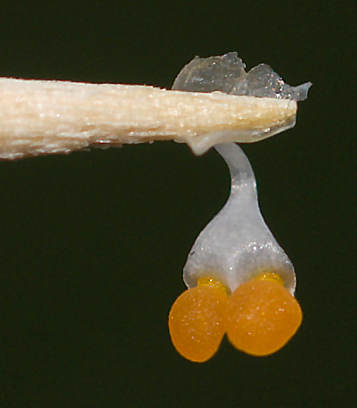
Phalaenopsis pollinia (orange) attached to a toothpick with its sticky viscidium

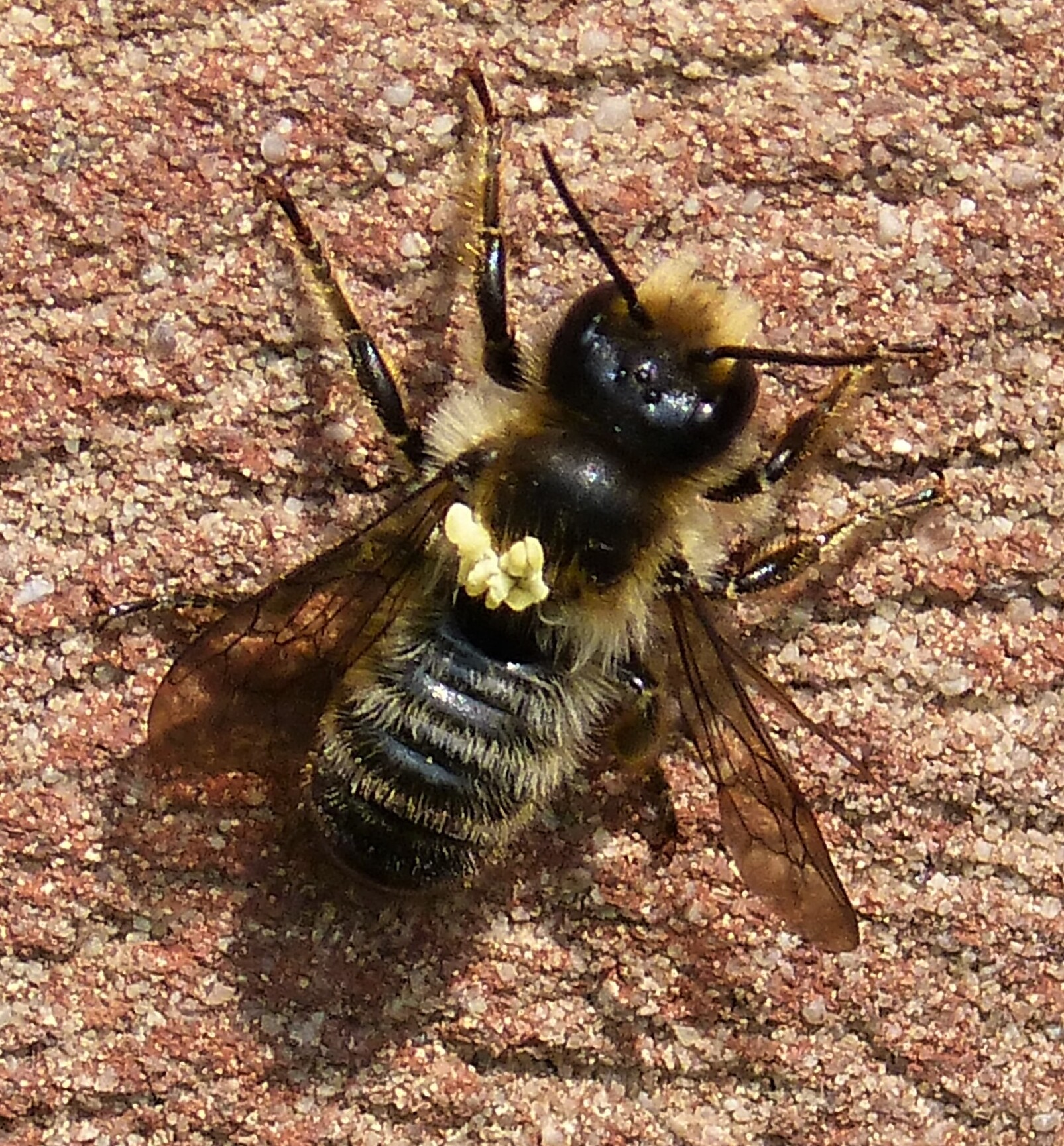
Leafcutter bee (Megachilidae) with orchid pollinia attached

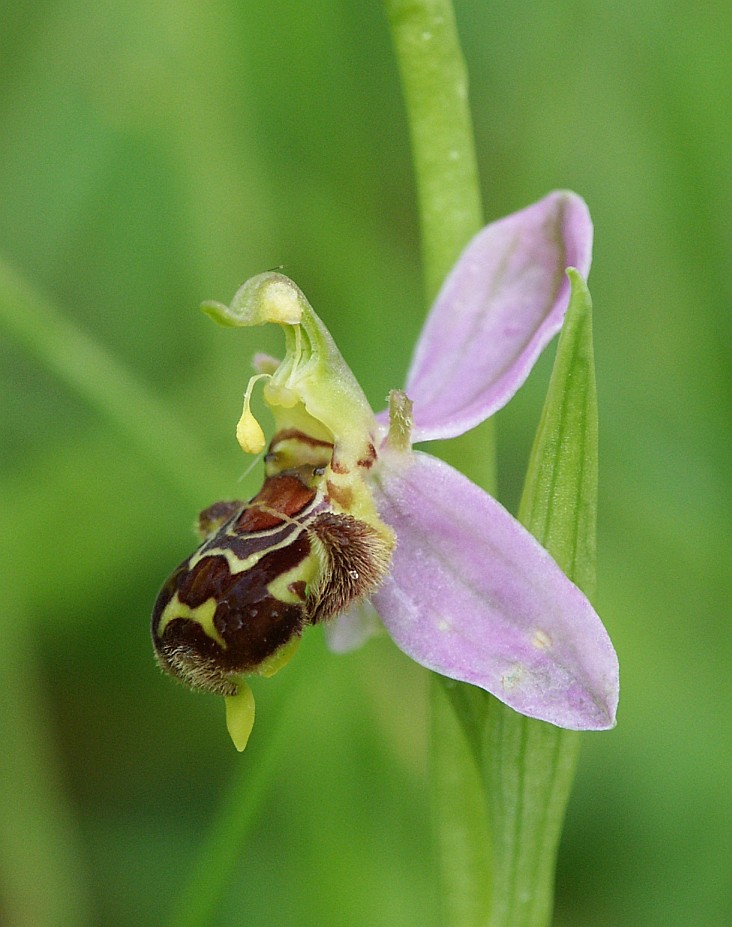
Ophrys apifera. A pollinium is visible.

=== Special cases ===
Pollinators are often visually attracted by the shape and colours of the labellum. However, some Bulbophyllum species attract male fruit flies (Bactrocera and Zeugodacus spp.) solely via a floral chemical which simultaneously acts as a floral reward (e.g. methyl eugenol, raspberry ketone, or zingerone) to perform pollination.

The slipper orchid Paphiopedilum parishii reproduces by self-fertilization. This occurs when the anther changes from a solid to a liquid state and directly contacts the stigma surface without the aid of any pollinating agent or floral assembly.

In some extremely specialized orchids, such as the Eurasian genus Ophrys, the labellum is adapted to have a colour, shape, and odour which attracts male insects via mimicry of a receptive female. Pollination happens as a male insect attempts to mate with the flowers.

Many neotropical orchids are pollinated by male orchid bees, which visit the flowers to gather volatile chemicals they require to synthesize pheromonal attractants. Males of species such as Euglossa imperialis or Eulaema meriana leave their territories periodically to forage for aromatic compounds, such as cineole, to synthesize pheromone for attracting females.

Catasetum saccatum, discussed by Darwin, launches its viscid pollinia with explosive force when an insect touches a seta, knocking the pollinator off the flower.

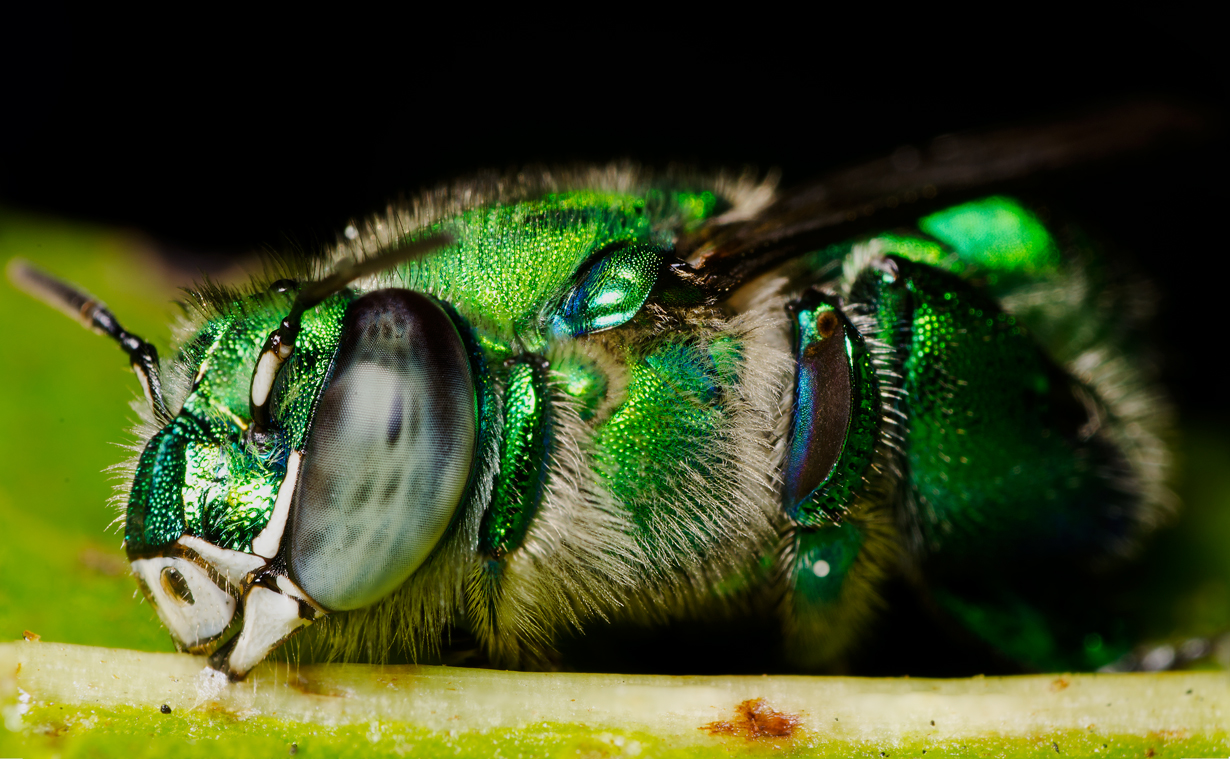
Orchid bees such as Euglossa viridissima collect aromatic compounds on their hind legs as they pollinate neotropical orchids.

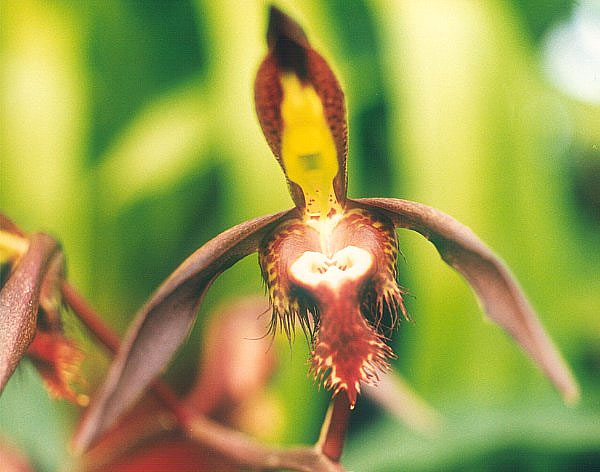
When a bee touches a seta (a trigger hair) on the flower of Catasetum saccatum, the sticky pollinia are shot explosively at the insect.

=== Asexual reproduction ===
Some species, such as in the genera Phalaenopsis, Dendrobium, and Vanda, produce offshoots or plantlets formed from one of the nodes along the stem, through the accumulation of growth hormones at that point. These shoots are known to horticulturalists as keiki.

Epipogium aphyllum exhibits a dual reproductive strategy, engaging in both sexual and asexual seed production. The likelihood of apomixis playing a substantial role in successful reproduction appears minimal. Within certain petite orchid species groups, there is a noteworthy preparation of female gametes for fertilization preceding the act of pollination.

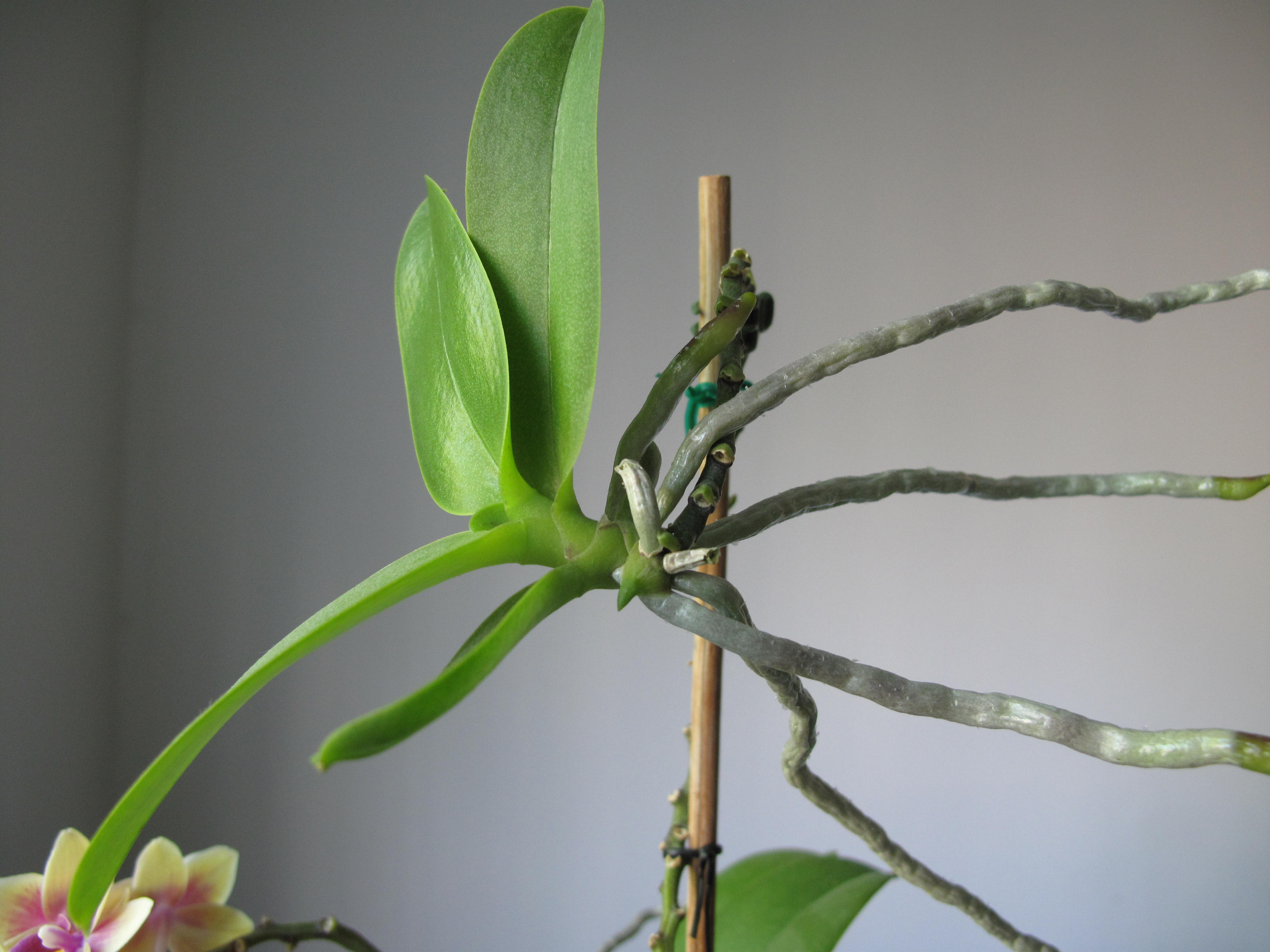
A keiki plantlet at the apex of a Phalaenopsis orchid, ready to be cut and planted

=== Fruits and seeds ===
The ovary develops into a capsule that is dehiscent by three or six longitudinal slits in its sides.

The seeds of orchids are almost microscopic and very numerous, in some species over a million per capsule. They have typically a thin seed coat composed of one to a few layers of cells. After ripening, they blow off like dust particles or spores. Most orchid species lack endosperm in their seed and must enter symbiotic relationships with various mycorrhizal basidiomyceteous fungi that provide them the necessary nutrients to germinate, so almost all orchid species are mycoheterotrophic during germination and reliant upon fungi to complete their lifecycles. Only a handful of orchid species have seeds that can germinate without mycorrhiza, namely the species within the genus Disa with hydrochorous seeds.

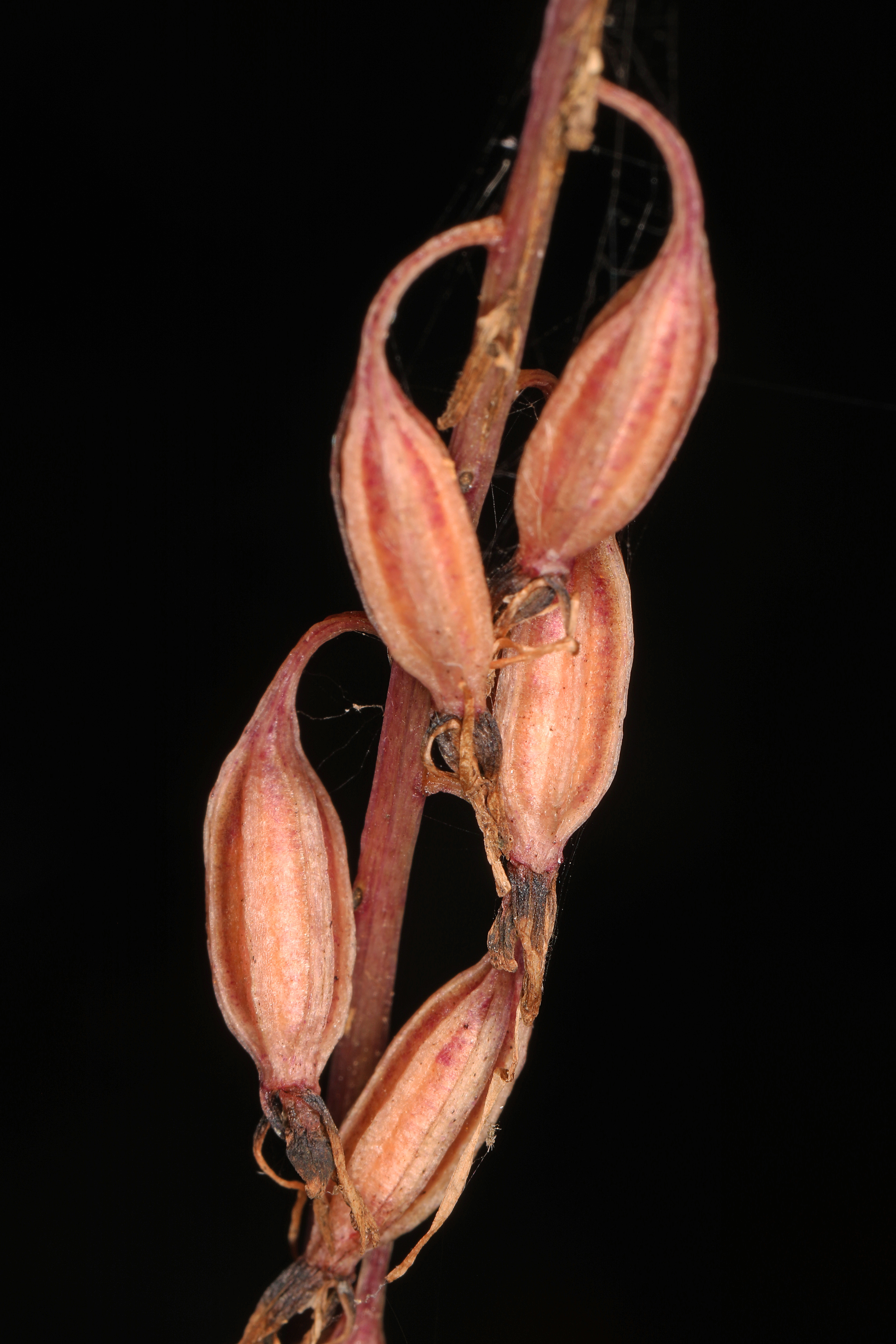
Orchid fruits are capsules,
here of Tipularia discolor.

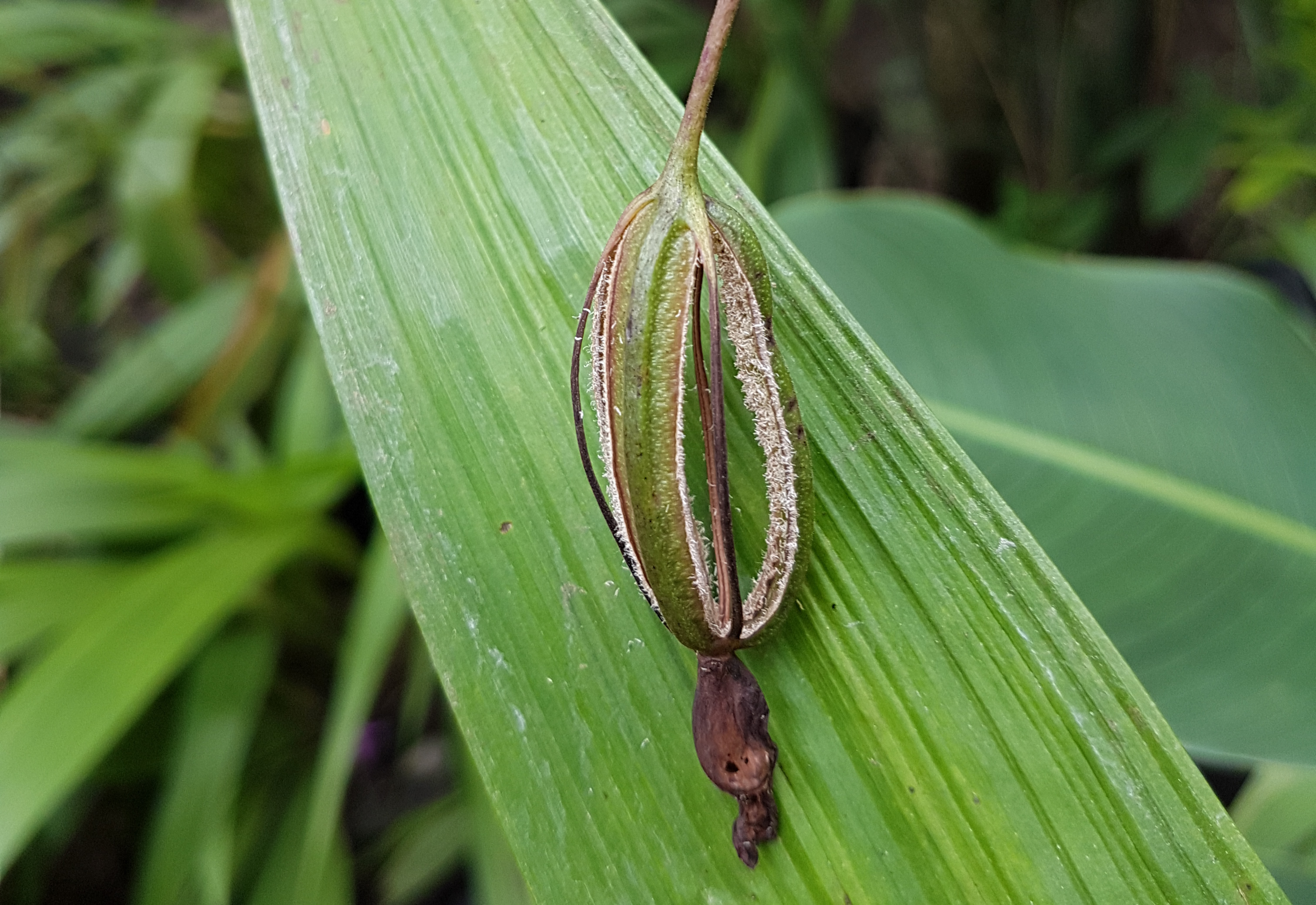
Orchid capsule, dehiscing with slits to release the tiny seeds, here of Spathoglottis plicata

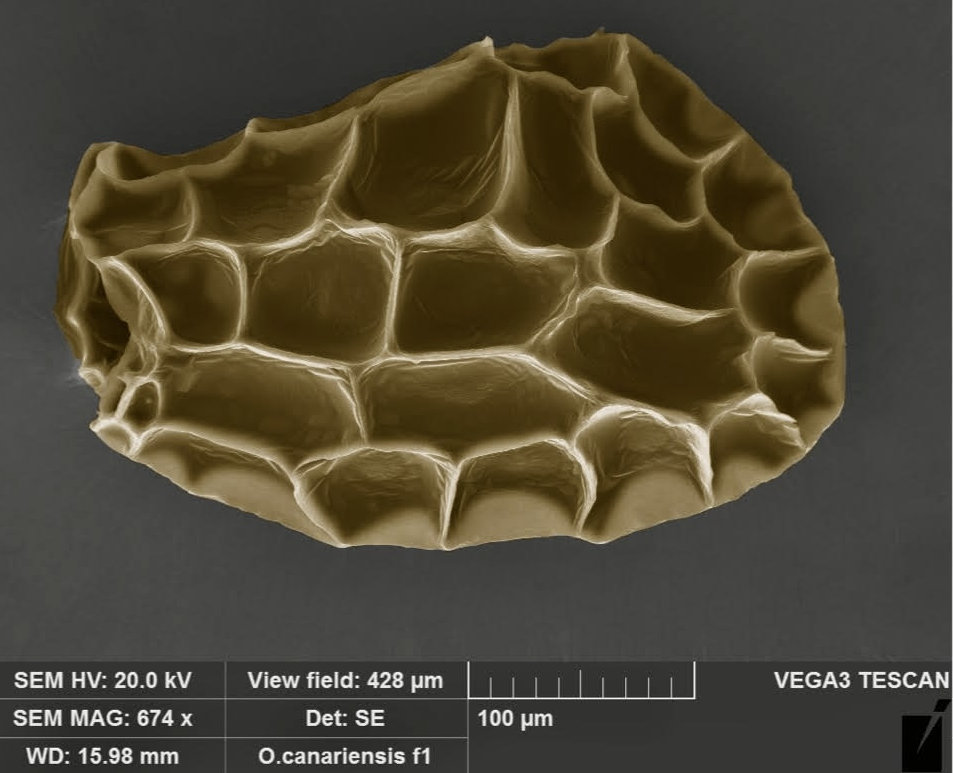
Electron micrograph of an Orchis canariensis seed, some 300 μm long

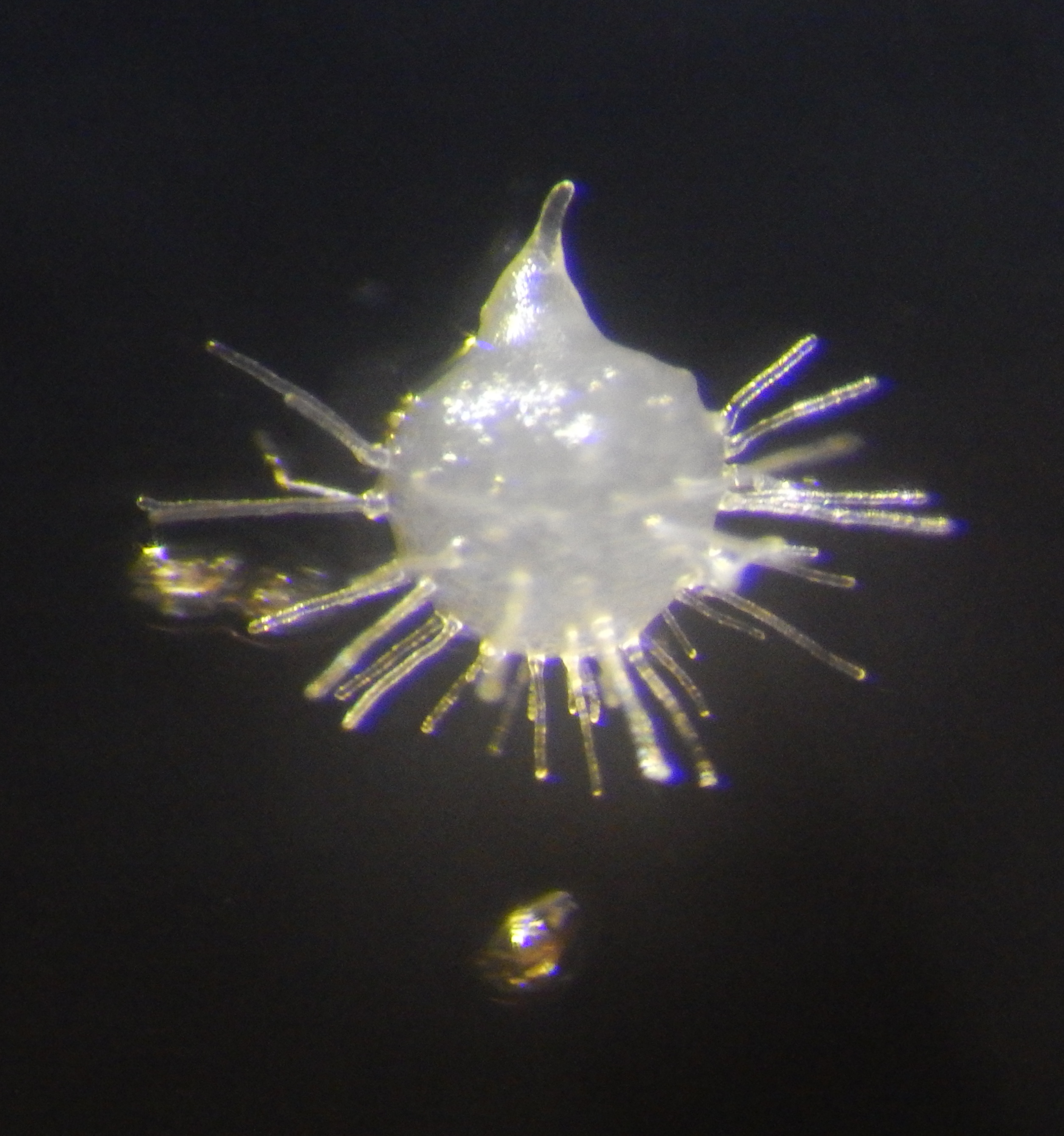
Himantoglossum adriaticum germinating seed with rhizoids

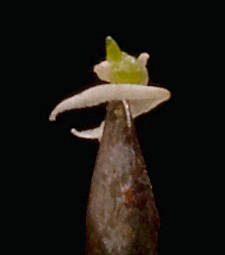
Disa uniflora seedling on a Sphagnum leaf, on a thumbtack point

== Evolution ==
=== Fossil and reconstructed history ===
Few orchid fossils are recorded. An extinct species of stingless bee, Proplebeia dominicana, was found trapped in Miocene amber from about 15–20 million years ago. The bee was carrying pollen of a previously unknown orchid taxon, Meliorchis caribea, on its wings. This 2007 find provided the first fossil evidence of orchids. It shows insects were active pollinators of orchids in the Miocene. M. caribea has been placed within the extant tribe Cranichideae, subtribe Goodyerinae (subfamily Orchidoideae). An even older orchid species, Succinanthera baltica, was described in 2017 from Baltic amber of Eocene age, some 40–55 million years ago.

Genetic sequencing indicates orchids may have arisen earlier, 76 to 84 million years ago during the Late Cretaceous. According to Mark W. Chase et al. (2001), the overall biogeography and phylogenetic patterns of Orchidaceae show they are even older and may go back roughly 100 million years.

The molecular clock method has provided ages for the major branches of the orchid family. The subfamily Vanilloideae is a branch at the base of the monandrous orchids, and must have evolved very early in the evolution of the family, some 60 to 70 million years ago. Since this subfamily occurs worldwide in tropical and subtropical regions, from tropical America to tropical Asia, New Guinea and West Africa, and the continents began to split about 100 million years ago, significant biotic exchange must have occurred after this split. Biogeographic studies indicate that the most recent common ancestor of all extant orchids probably originated 83 million years ago somewhere in the supercontinent Laurasia. Despite their long evolutionary history on Earth, the extant orchid diversity is also inferred to have originated during the last 5 million years, with the American and Asian tropics as the geographic areas exhibiting the highest speciation rates (i.e., number of speciation events per million years) on Earth.

Genome duplication occurred prior to the divergence of this taxon.

=== Phylogeny ===
The cladogram below was made according to the APG system of 1998. It represents the view that most botanists had held up to that time. It was supported by morphological studies.

- Orchidaceae
  - Apostasioideae: 2 genera and 16 species, south-eastern Asia
  - - Cypripedioideae: 5 genera and 130 species, from temperate regions, tropical America and tropical Asia
    - Monandrae
      - Vanilloideae: 15 genera and 180 species, humid tropical and subtropical regions, eastern North America
      - - Epidendroideae: more than 500 genera and some 20,000 species, cosmopolitan
        - Orchidoideae: 208 genera and 3,630 species, cosmopolitan

In 2015, a phylogenetic study showed strong statistical support for the following topology of the orchid tree, using 9 kb of plastid and nuclear DNA from 7 genes, a topology that was confirmed by a phylogenomic study in the same year.

- Orchidaceae
  - Apostasioideae
  - - Vanilloideae
    - - Cypripedioideae
      - - Epidendroideae
        - Orchidoideae

=== Taxonomy ===
The orchids are among the largest and most diverse taxonomic groups of vascular plants, with at least 700 genera and 28,000 species; they are rivalled only by the Asteraceae (Compositae) which has some 1,600 genera and around 24,700 species, and new species are continually being discovered and described. In 1753, Carl Linnaeus recognized eight genera of orchids in his Species Plantarum. Antoine Laurent de Jussieu recognized the Orchidaceae as a separate family in his Genera Plantarum in 1789. Olof Swartz recognized 25 genera in 1800. In 1830–1840, John Lindley recognized four subfamilies. The family was placed in the order Asparagales by the APG III system of taxonomy of 2009, mainly using molecular phylogenetics, where five subfamilies are recognised. (Note: A unique feature of the orchid family is a system of abbreviations for names of genera and nothogenera. The system is maintained by the Royal Horticultural Society.) The diversity of orchids led taxonomists to create hundreds of genera. Some taxonomists felt that the number had become excessive, and published classifications with fewer genera. Dressler had some 850 genera in 2013; Genera Orchidacearum reduced this to 765 in 2014; and Chase continued the process of merging genera, with 736 in 2015.

=== Hybrids ===
Orchid species hybridize readily in cultivation, leading to a large number of hybrids with complex naming. Hybridization is possible across genera, and therefore many cultivated orchids are placed into nothogenera. For instance, the nothogenus × Brassocattleya is used for all hybrids of species from the genera Brassavola and Cattleya. Nothogenera based on at least three genera may have names based on a person's name with the suffix -ara, for instance × Colmanara=Miltonia × Odontoglossum × Oncidium. The suffix is obligatory starting at four genera.

Cultivated hybrids in the orchid family are also special in that they are named by using grex nomenclature, rather than nothospecies. For instance, hybrids between Brassavola nodosa and Brassavola acaulis are placed in the grex Brassavola Guiseppi. The name of the grex ("Guiseppi" in this example) is written in a non-italic font without quotes.

== Distribution and ecology ==
Orchidaceae are cosmopolitan in distribution, occurring in every continent except for Antarctica. A majority are epiphytic, living high on trees in the tropics and subtropics; some such as Angraecum sororium are lithophytes, on rocks; others are terrestrial, growing on the ground.

=== Species interactions ===
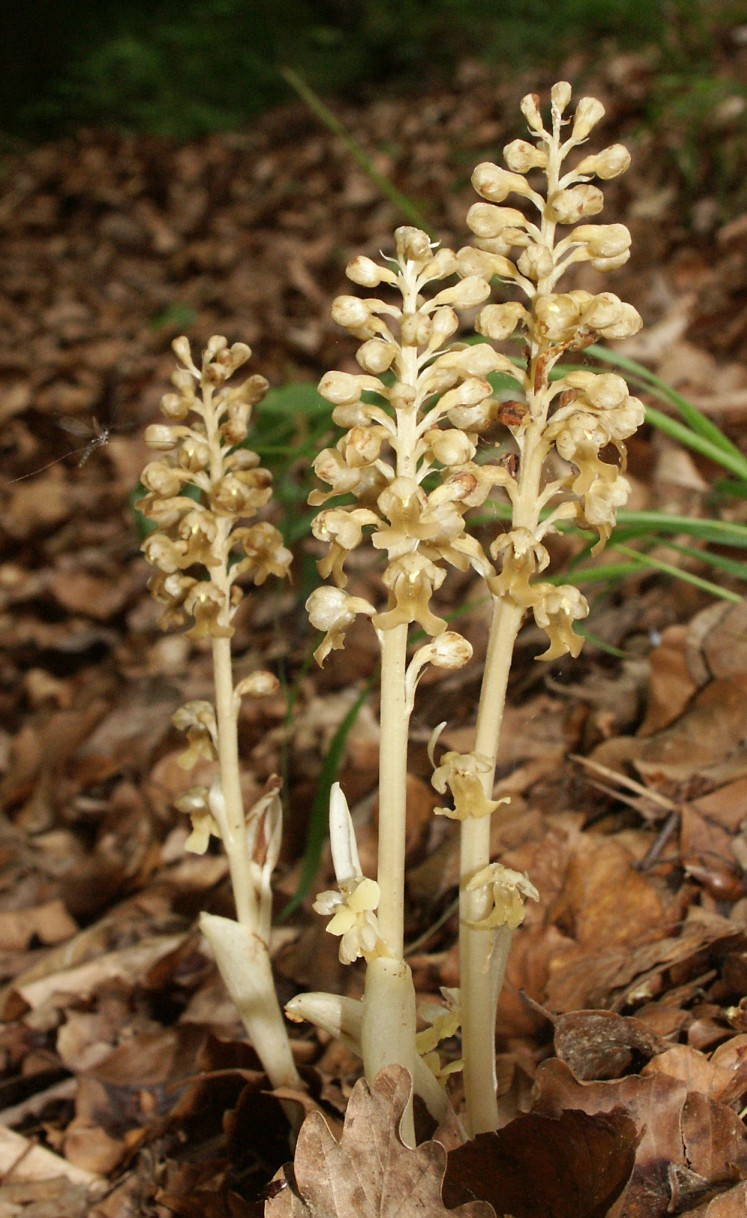
Neottia nidus-avis, the birdsnest orchid, has no chlorophyll and is parasitic.

Some orchids, such as Neottia and Corallorhiza, lack chlorophyll, so are unable to photosynthesise. Instead, these species obtain energy and nutrients by parasitising soil fungi through the formation of orchid mycorrhizae. The fungi involved include those that form ectomycorrhizas with trees and other woody plants, parasites such as Armillaria, and saprotrophs. These orchids are known as myco-heterotrophs, but were formerly (incorrectly) described as saprophytes as it was believed they gained their nutrition by breaking down organic matter. While only a few species are achlorophyllous holoparasites, all orchids are myco-heterotrophic during germination and seedling growth, and even photosynthetic adult plants may continue to obtain carbon from their mycorrhizal fungi. The symbiosis is typically maintained throughout the lifetime of the orchid because they depend on the fungus for nutrients, sugars and minerals.

Orchids employ multiple forms of deception to attract pollinators. Some produce the aroma of nectar without providing the actual food reward. Others attract nematoceran gnats which feed on decaying fungi with the aroma of mushrooms. Others again produce the aroma of female insects, attracting male insects to attempt to copulate. In each case the orchid is pollinated by an insect that is deceived and that does not receive the expected reward.

== Uses ==
=== Horticulture ===
Many orchid species and hybrids are cultivated for their flowers. Most of these are tropical or subtropical, needing to be grown indoors in temperate zones, but some such as species of Cypripedium and Dactylorhiza can be grown outdoors in temperate climates. Several thousand new cultivated orchid hybrids are registered each year.

A large number of societies and clubs for orchid growers are run in countries in all continents except Antarctica. National societies include the Orchid Society of Great Britain and the American Orchid Society. New orchids are registered with the International Orchid Register, maintained by the Royal Horticultural Society. An annual festival of orchids is held in February every year at the Royal Botanic Gardens, Kew.

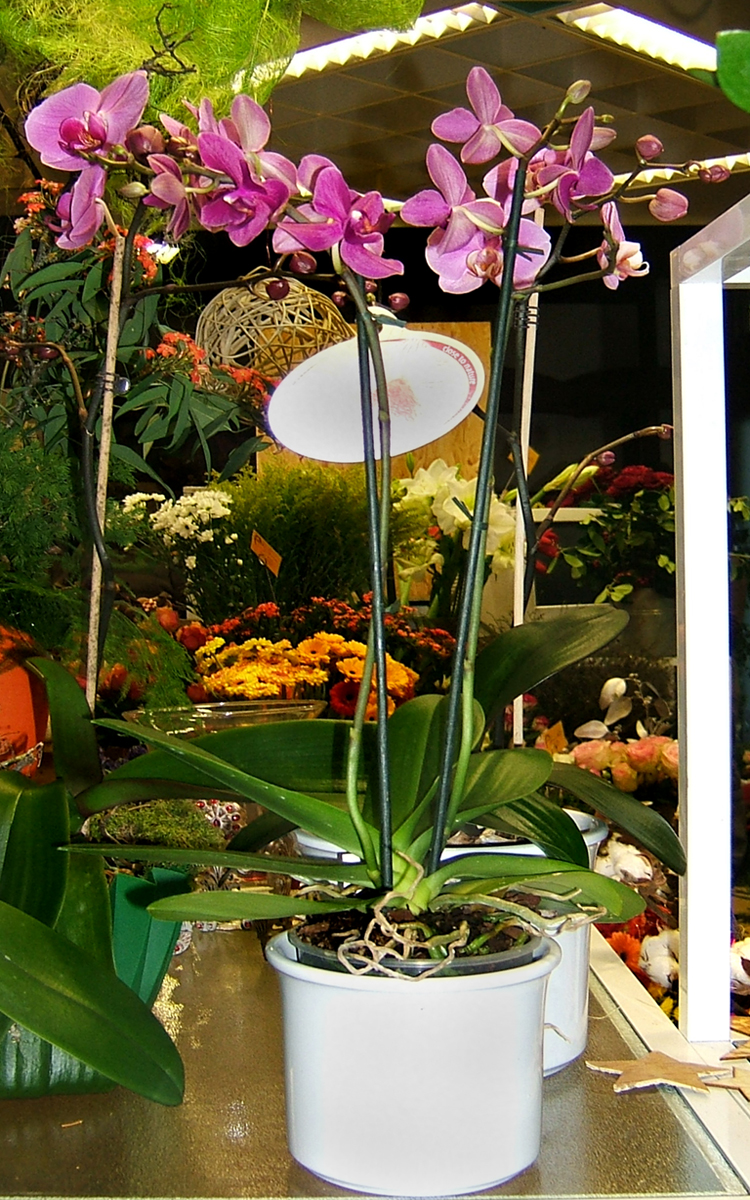
A cultivated Phalaenopsis

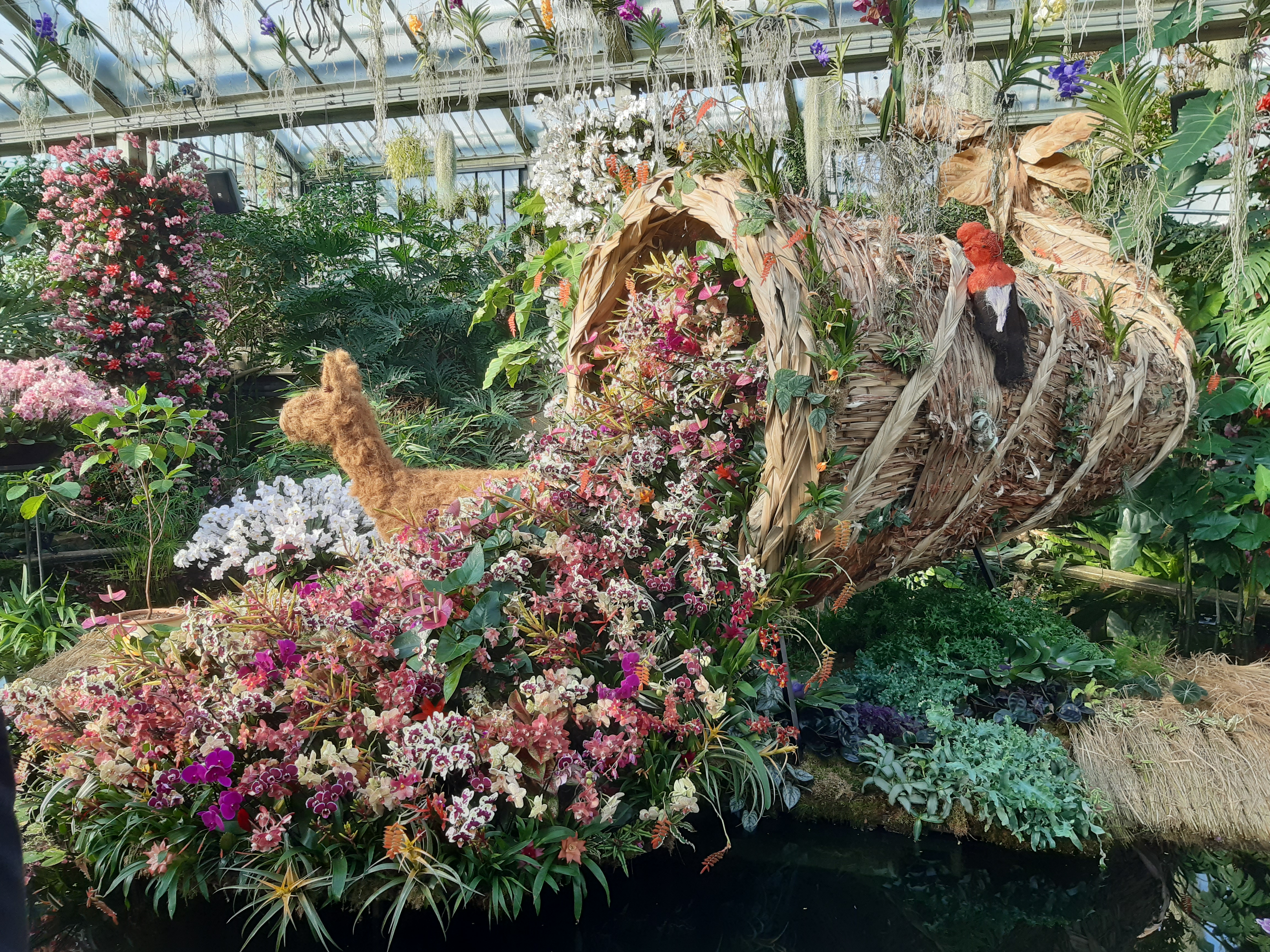
Orchid cornucopia in the annual festival of orchids at the Royal Botanic Gardens, Kew

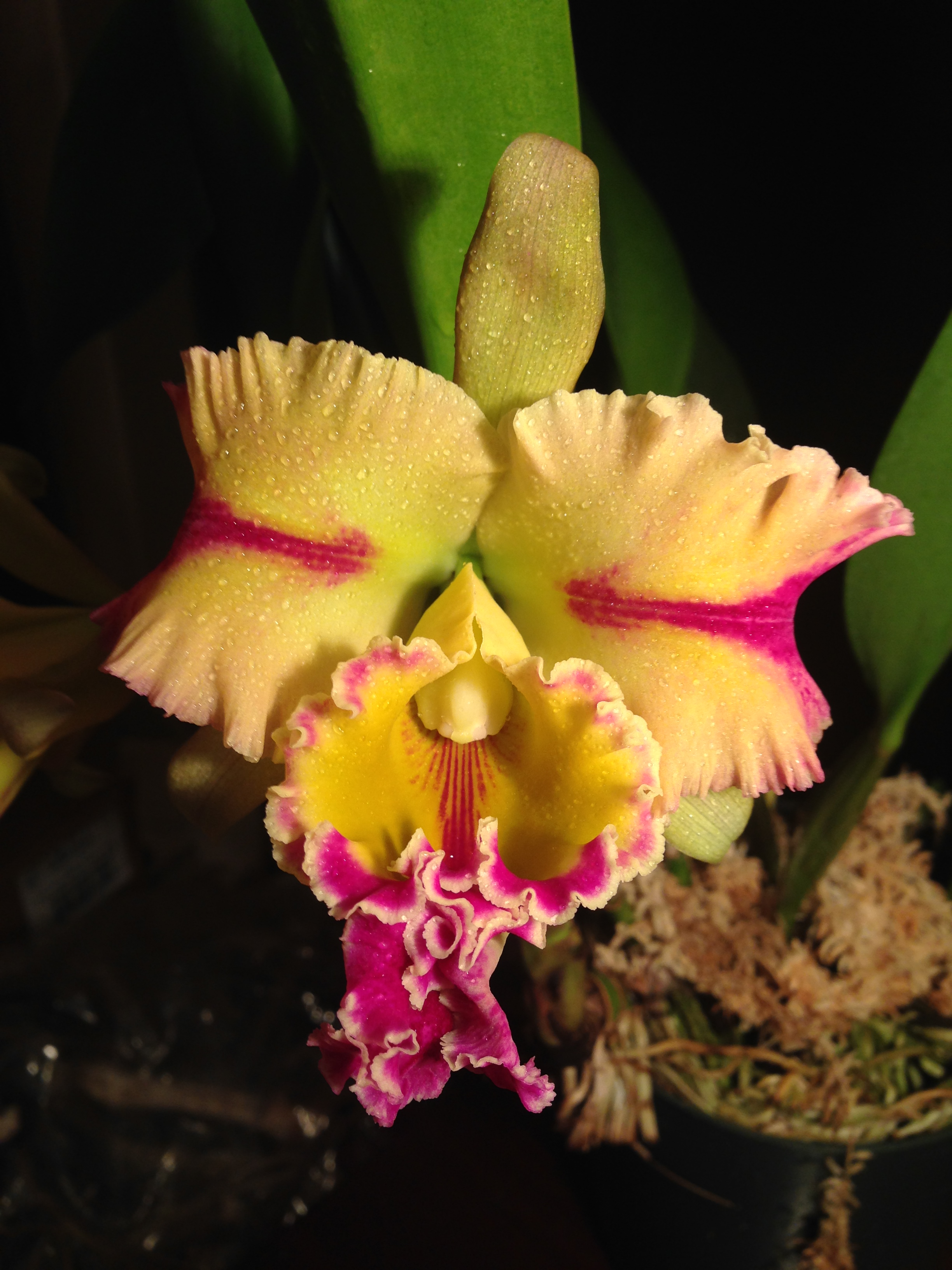
A × Brassolaeliocattleya ("BLC") Paradise Jewel 'Flame' hybrid orchid

=== Flavours and aromas ===
The dried seed pods of one orchid genus, Vanilla (especially Vanilla planifolia), are commercially important as a flavouring in baking, for perfume manufacture and aromatherapy.

The scent of orchids is frequently analysed by perfumers using headspace technology, gas-liquid chromatography, and mass spectrometry to identify potential fragrance chemicals.

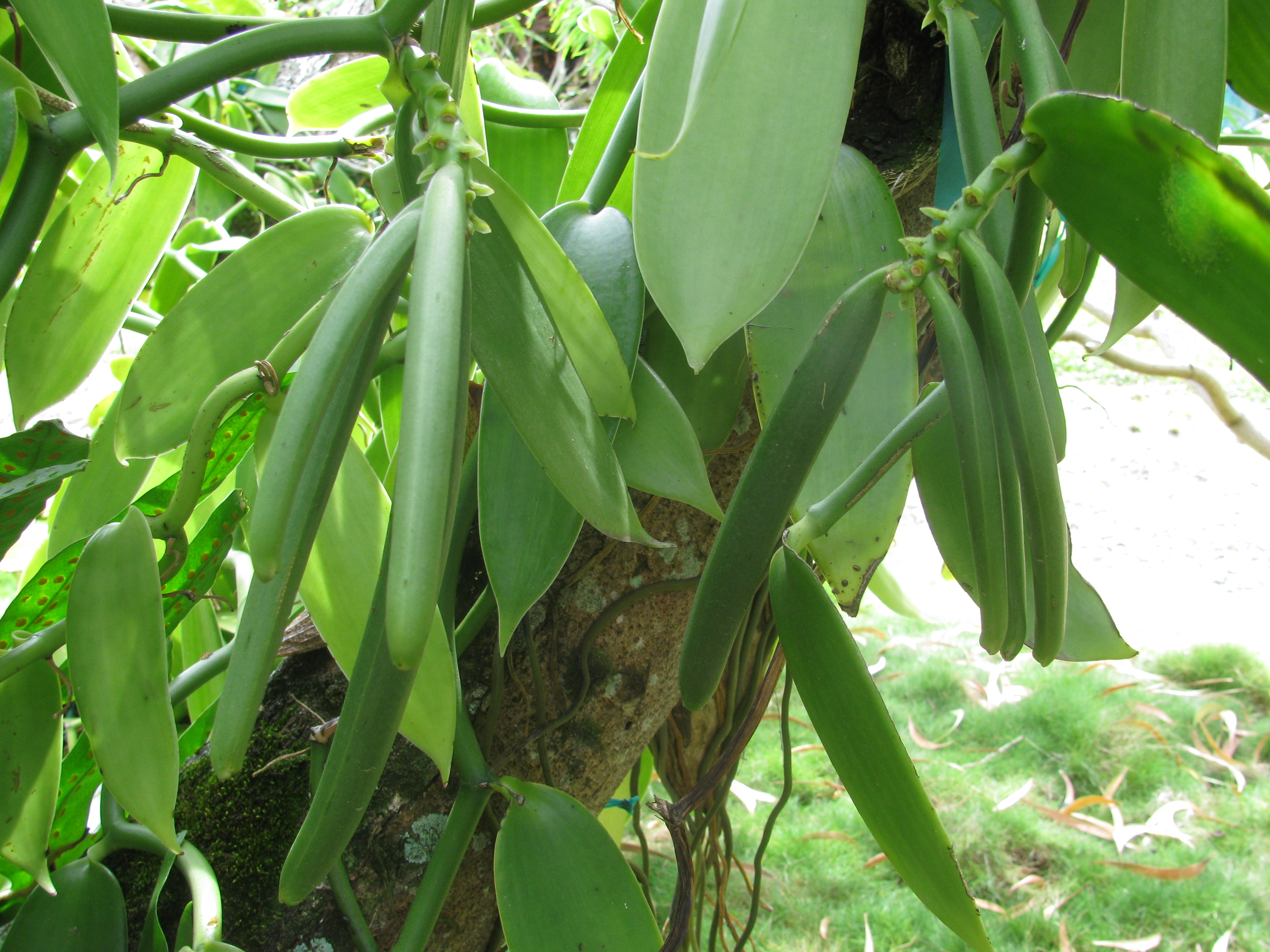
Vanilla planifolia with green seedpods

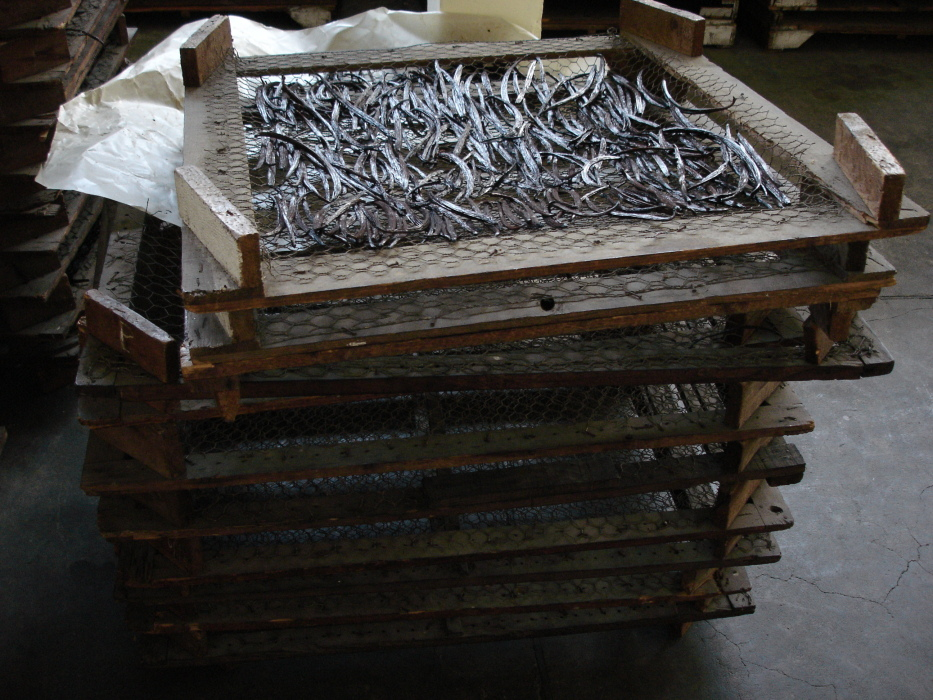
Vanilla seedpods drying

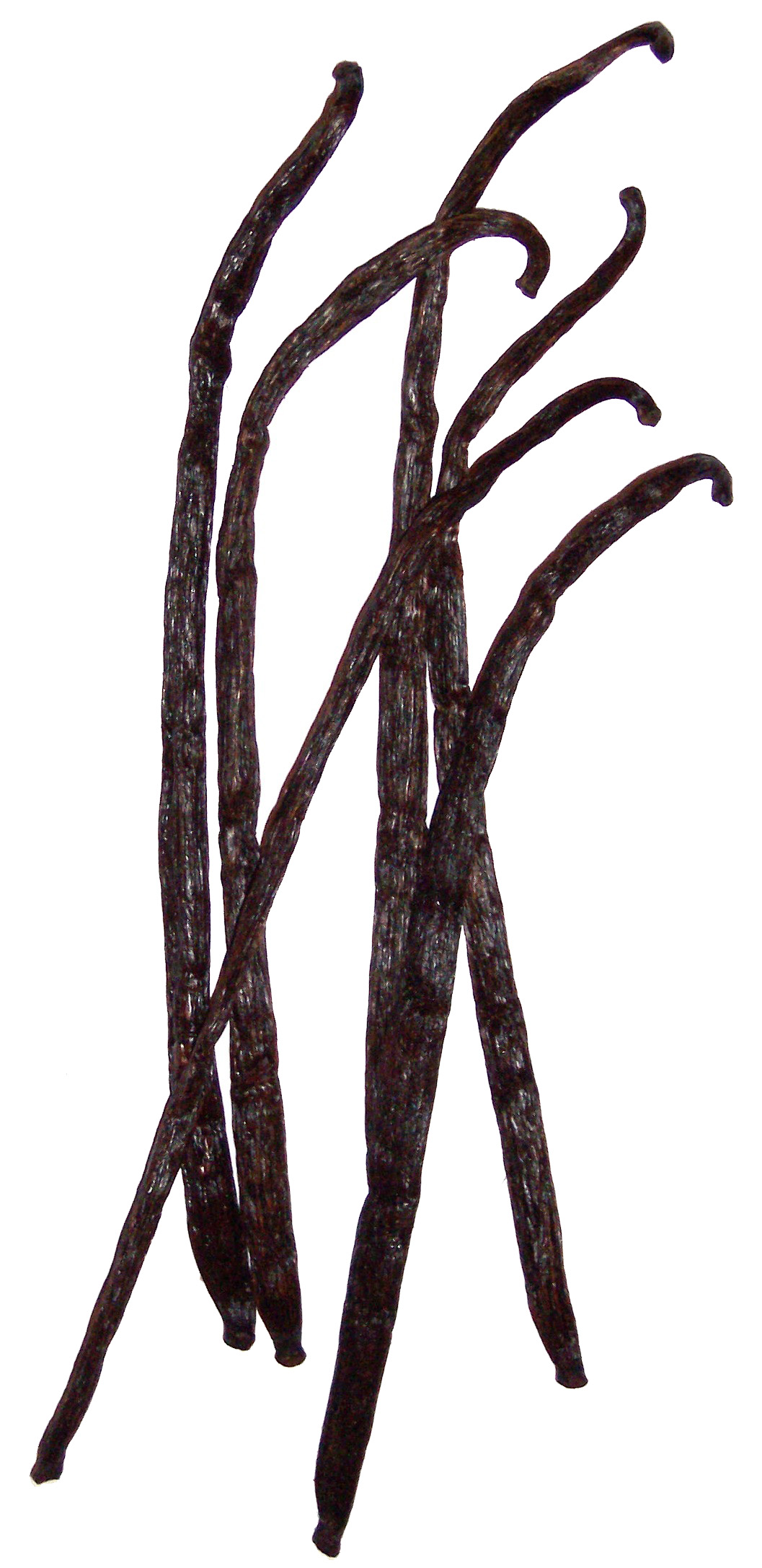
Vanilla "beans" used as a spice

=== Food ===
The tubers of terrestrial orchids (mainly early purple orchid, Orchis mascula) are ground to a powder and used for cooking, such as in the hot beverage salep and ice cream, leading to local extinctions in parts of Greece, Turkey, and Iran. Some saprophytic orchid species of the group Gastrodia produce potato-like tubers and were eaten by native peoples in Australia and can be cultivated, notably Gastrodia sesamoides. Wild stands of these plants still grow near early Aboriginal settlements, such as Ku-ring-gai Chase National Park. Aboriginal peoples found the plants by observing where bandicoots had scratched in search of the tubers after detecting the plants by scent.

== Cultural symbolism ==
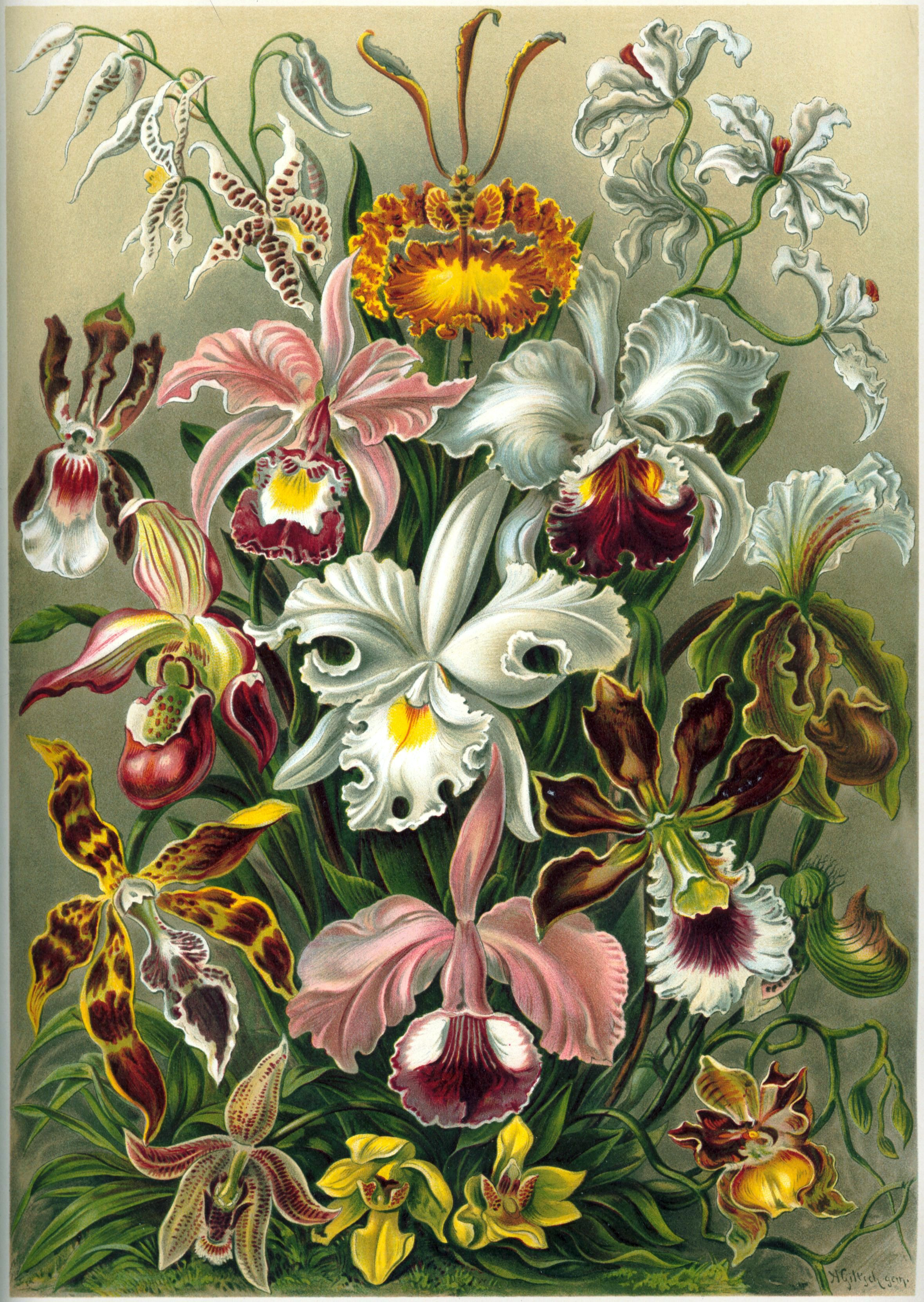
"Orchideae" in Ernst Haeckel's 1899 Kunstformen der Natur

Orchids have symbolic values in some cultures; several countries have chosen orchids as their national flowers. Because of the etymology of the word "orchid", and the use of orchiectomy, a surgery on intersex infants, the orchid has become a symbol of being intersex and of opposition to non-consensual genital surgery.

Orchids native to the Mediterranean are depicted on the Ara Pacis in Rome, until now the only known instance of orchids in ancient art, and the earliest in European art. A French writer and agronomist, Louis Liger, invented a classical myth in his book Le Jardinier Fleuriste et Historiographe published in 1704, attributing it to the ancient Greeks and Romans, in which Orchis, the son of a nymph and a satyr, rapes a priestess of Bacchus during one of his festivals the Bacchanalia and is then killed and transformed into an orchid flower as punishment by the gods, paralleling the various myths of youths dying and becoming flowers, like Adonis and Narcissus; this myth however does not appear any earlier than Liger, and is not part of traditional Greek and Roman mythologies.

== Conservation ==
Almost all orchids are included in Appendix II of the Convention on International Trade in Endangered Species (CITES), meaning that international trade is regulated by the CITES permit system. A smaller number of orchids, such as Paphiopedilum species, are listed in CITES Appendix I, meaning that commercial international trade in wild-sourced specimens is prohibited and other trade is strictly controlled.

Assisted migration may be a viable conservation tool for orchids endangered by climate change. In 2006 the Longtan Dam was built near the Yachang Orchid Nature Reserve. In response to the threat of inundation at lower altitudes (350–400 m), 1000 endangered orchid plants of 16 genera and 29 species were translocated to higher elevation (around 1000 m), where they survived well.

== See also ==
- Adaptation (film), based on The Orchid Thief
- Orchid Conservation Coalition
- Orchid Pavilion Gathering
- Orchidelirium, the Victorian era of flower madness in which collecting and discovering orchids reached extraordinary levels
- Orchids of the Philippines
- Orchids of Western Australia
- Orchidaceae of Mexico and Guatemala, an extremely large Victorian era book of orchids
- Shangsi Festival
- Black rot on orchids
- List of taxa named after human genitals
