= John Bateman (British politician) =

British politician and philanthropist

John Bateman (19 March 1839 – 12 October 1910) was a British politician. He is best known for the reference work The Great Landowners of Great Britain and Ireland, and for Bateman's Tower, a folly he had built in Brightlingsea, Essex.

== Family and early life ==
John Bateman was born on 19 March 1839 at Biddulph Grange, Staffordshire. He was the eldest son of James Bateman and Maria Sybilla Egerton-Warburton,, and would be joined in due course by two brothers Rowland and Robert and a sister, Katherine.

Bateman was educated at Brighton College, Sussex, and at Trinity College, Cambridge.

Bateman married Jessie Caroline Bootle Wilbraham on 4 October 1865. The couple had one child, a daughter named Agnes.

== Career ==
=== The Great Landowners ===
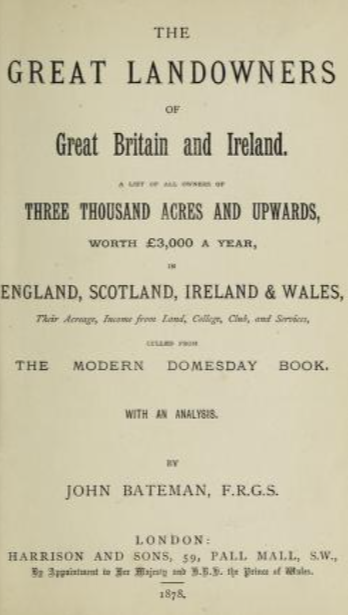
Bateman's seminal work, The Great Landowners of Great Britain and Ireland

From 1876 to 1883, Bateman published The Great Landowners of Great Britain and Ireland in four volumes. The reference work provided an index of United Kingdom's largest landowners, while also collating details of their education, political careers, and military service. The work – particularly the fourth and final volume – remains a useful primary source for historians of the Victorian era.

=== Staffordshire ===
Bateman held a number of positions in Staffordshire politics, Deputy Lieutenant for Staffordshire and Justice of the Peace.

=== Brightlingsea ===
In 1871, Bateman purchased the Brightlingsea Hall estate in Essex. There, too, he became involved in local politics, and held offices in Essex County Council and Brightlingsea Urban District Council. He experimented with agricultural innovations on his land, importing plants including maize, tobacco, and eucalyptus gunnii. In 1887 Brightlingsea restored its historic status as a Cinque Port liberty; Bateman was elected as the town's first Cinque Port deputy, a post he held for seven years: 1887–1891, 1899, and 1903.

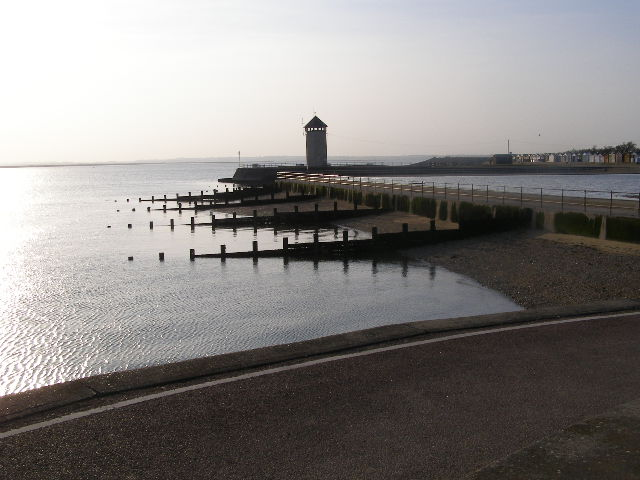
Bateman's Tower, built for Bateman in c. 1880

In addition to his involvement in politics, Bateman was a philanthropist. His donations to the town of Brightlingsea included the materials for a new school, the buildings for two almshouses, and land for both a churchyard extension and a sewage works. This made him a popular figure in the area, where he was known as the "Old Squire."

In c. 1880 Bateman had Bateman's Tower built in Brightlingsea; most likely as a folly, though it may have been intended as a lighthouse as part of a planned expansion of the town's port. The building stands to this day.

== Death ==
Bateman died in Brightlingsea on 12 October 1910.
