= Biddulph =

Town in Staffordshire, England

Coordinates: 53.119151°N 2.171922°W

- Town and Civil Parish
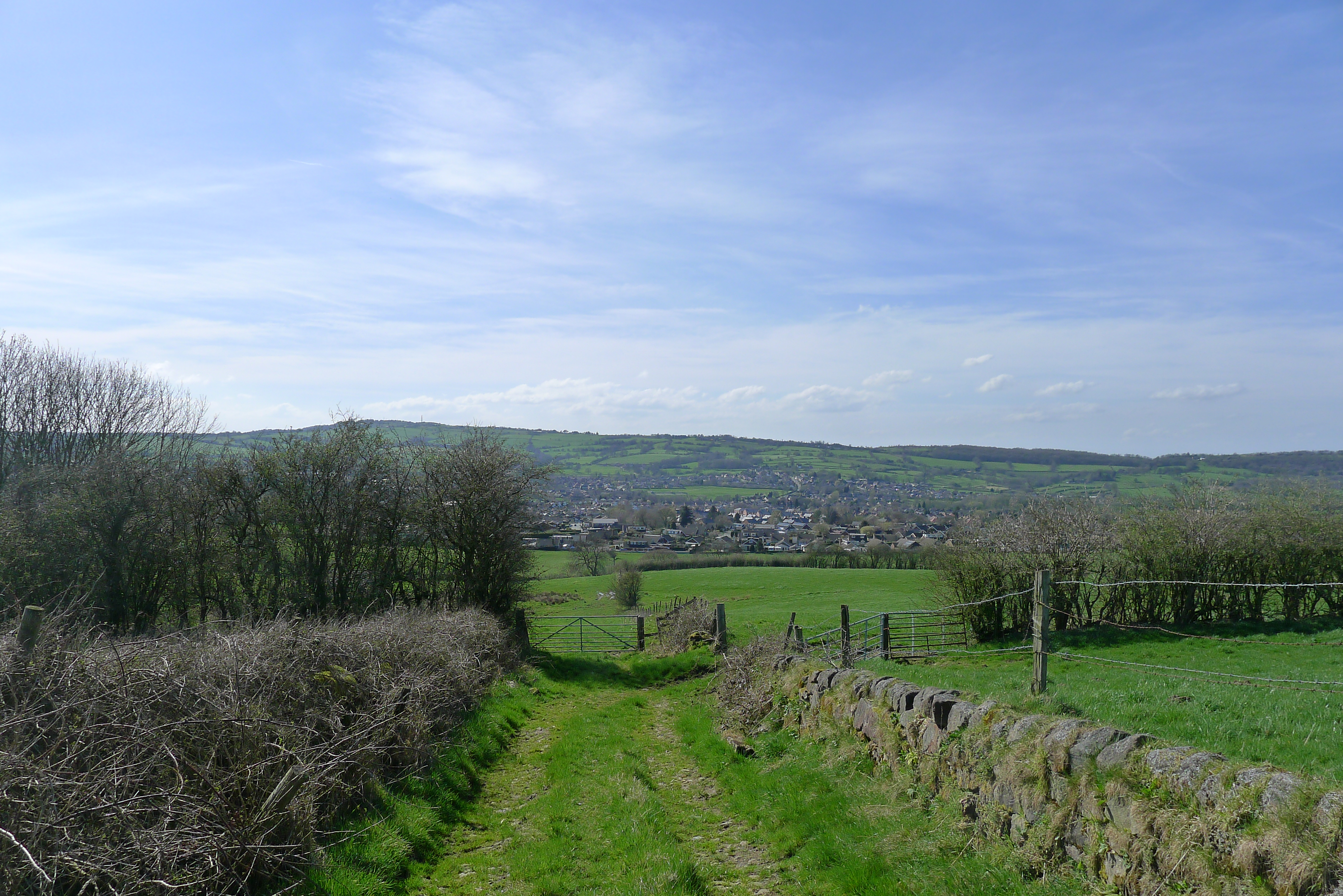
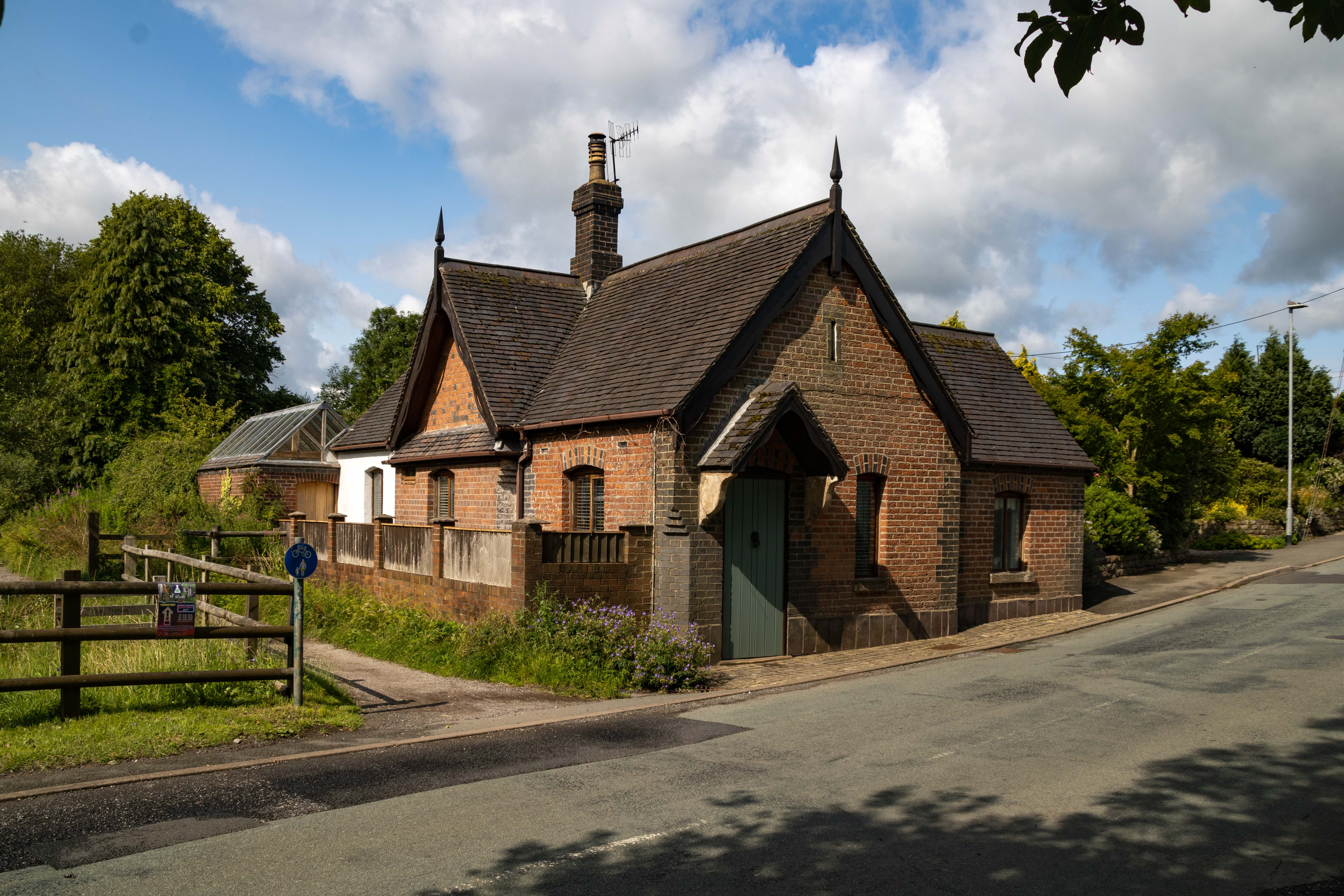
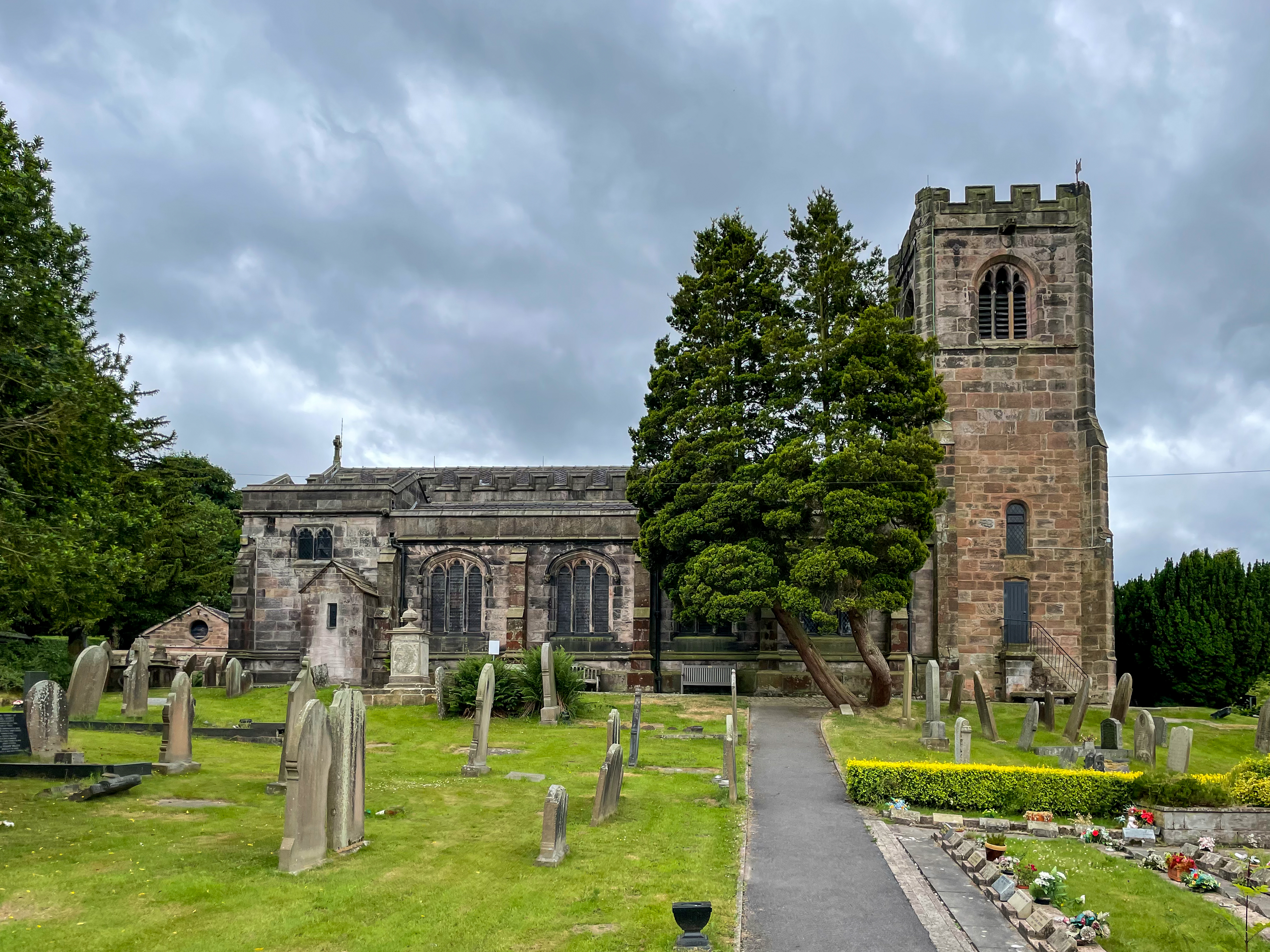
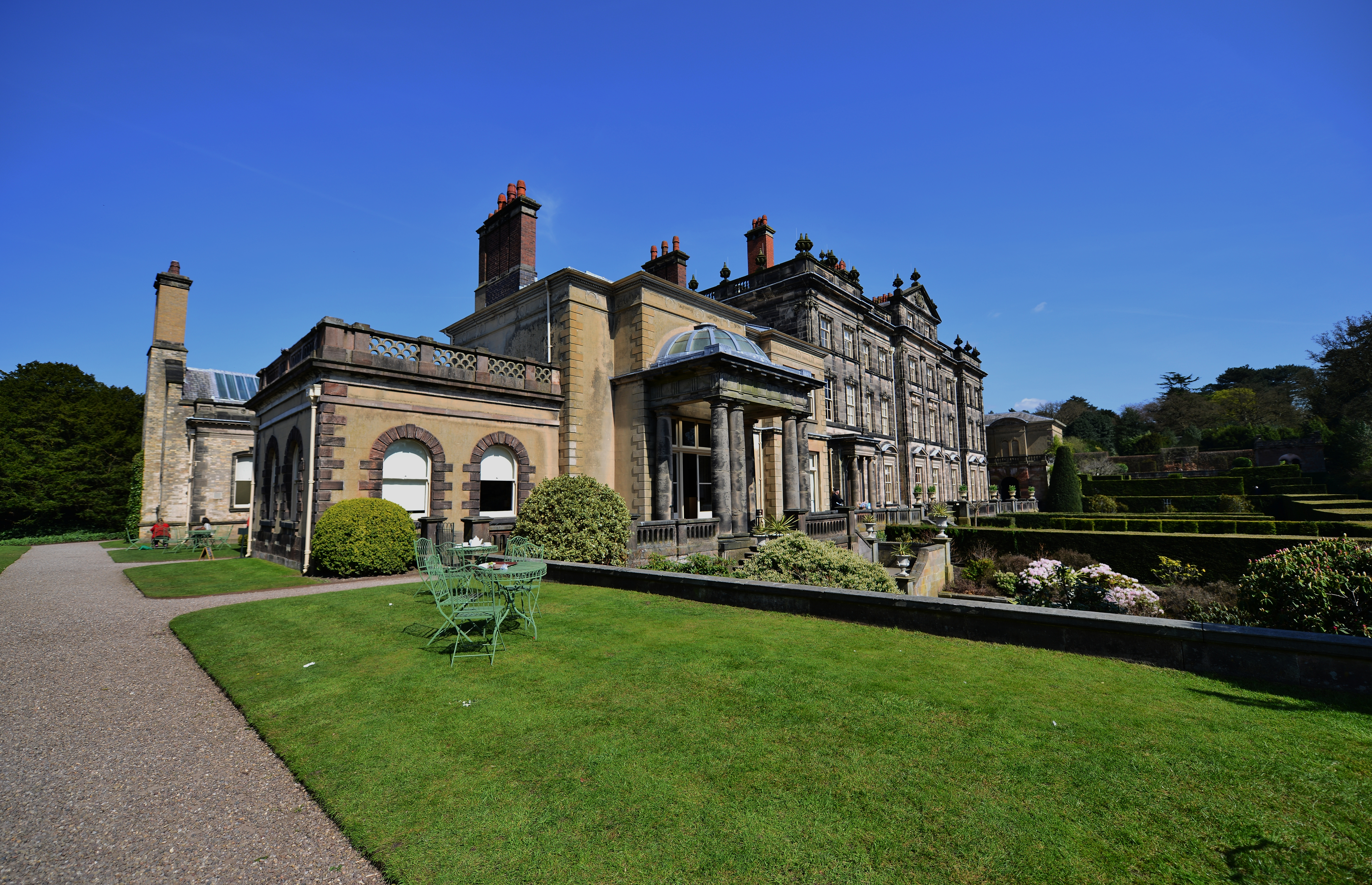
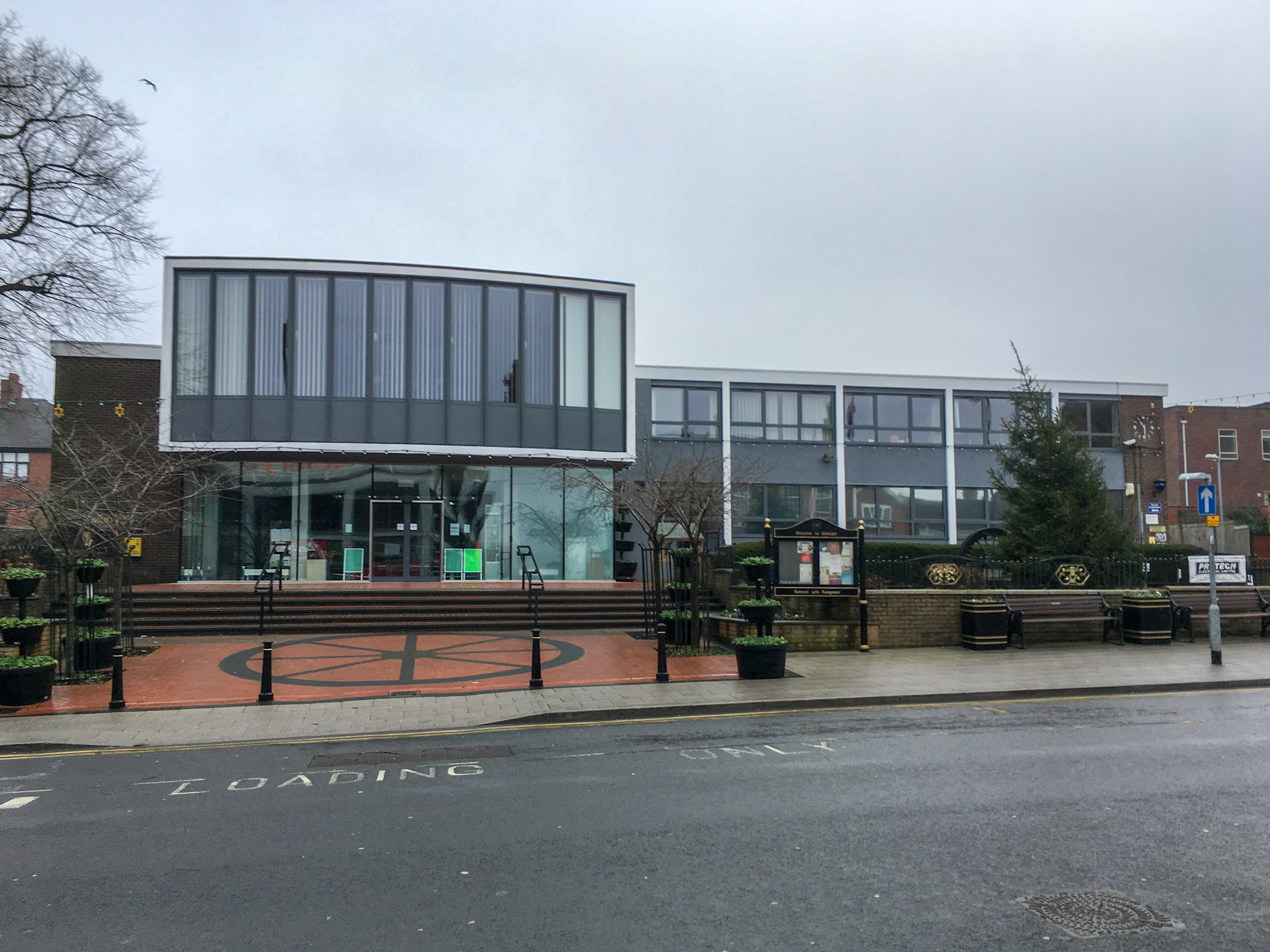
- A view of Biddulph from the moor The Station St Lawrence Church Biddulph Grange Town Hall

- Location within Staffordshire
- Population: 19,727 (2024 estimate)
- OS grid reference: SJ8857
- Civil parish: Biddulph
- District: Staffordshire Moorlands
- Shire county: Staffordshire
- Region: West Midlands
- Country: England
- Sovereign state: United Kingdom
- Suburbs of the town: List: Braddocks Hay; Brown Lees; Gillow Heath; Knypersley; Marsh Green; Poolfold; Woodhouse
- Post town: STOKE-ON-TRENT
- Postcode district: ST8
- Dialling code: 01782
- Police: Staffordshire
- Fire: Staffordshire
- Ambulance: West Midlands
- UK Parliament: Staffordshire Moorlands
- Website: https://www.staffsmoorlands.gov.uk/

Biddulph is a town and civil parish in the Staffordshire Moorlands district of the county of Staffordshire, England. The town lies 9 miles (14 km) north of Stoke-on-Trent and 5 miles (8 km) south-east of Congleton, close to part of the Staffordshire/Cheshire county border. In 2011 the parish had a population of 19,892.

== Origin of the name ==
Biddulph's name may come from Anglo-Saxon/Old English bī dylfe, meaning "beside the pit or quarry". It may also stem from a corruption of the Saxon/Old English Bidulfe, meaning "wolf slayer", and the Biddulph family crest is a wolf rampant.

In the days of coal and iron, Biddulph was called Bradley Green, with the original site of Biddulph being the area in which the parish church, Grange House and the ruins of Biddulph Old Hall stand. It was not until 1930 that the town was marked on Ordnance Survey maps as Biddulph.

== Geography ==
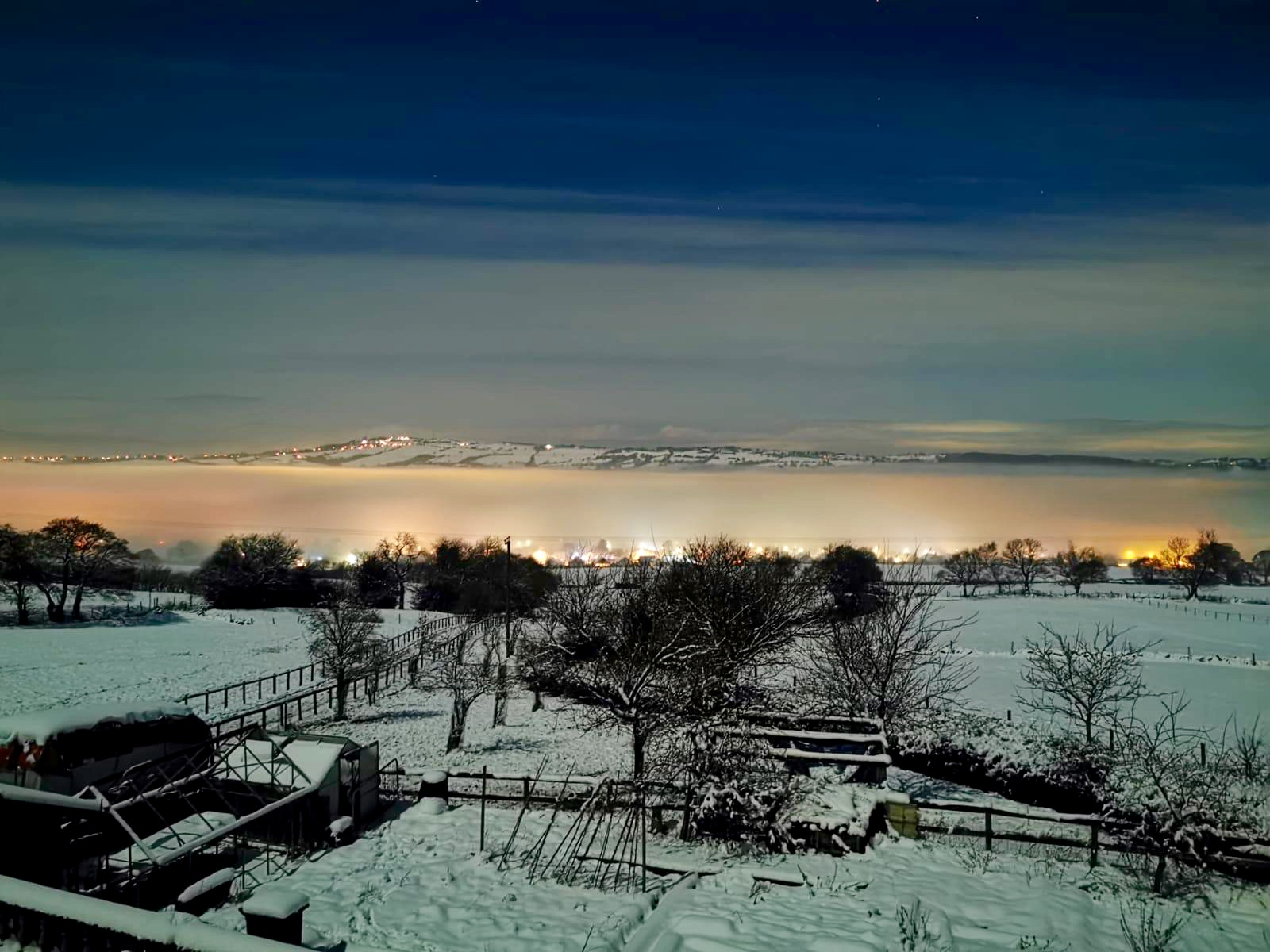
Biddulph Valley, filled with fog

Biddulph lies in a valley between the ridges of Mow Cop to the west and Biddulph Moor to the east.

== Education ==
In common with other parts of the area administered by Staffordshire LEA, the Middle School system operates in Biddulph.

The town has one high school (ages 13–16), with a sixth form (ages 16–18) called Biddulph High School; it was awarded Sports College status in 2002 and has since gained Technology College status. Biddulph also has two middle schools: Woodhouse Middle School (formerly Biddulph Grammar School), and James Bateman Middle School (formerly Park Middle School), serving pupils aged 9–13. These are fed by several first schools, including Kingsfield First School, Knypersley First School, Squirrel Hayes First School and Oxhey First School.

== Local media ==
=== Television ===
Since the town is close to the Cheshire-Staffordshire border, local news and television programmes are provided by BBC North West and ITV Granada that broadcast from Salford. However, the town can receive BBC West Midlands and ITV Central through satellite television such as Freesat and Sky.

=== Radio ===
Community radio station, Churnet Sound broadcasts in DAB across south Cheshire and North Staffordshire. Other local radio stations are BBC Radio Stoke, Hits Radio Staffordshire & Cheshire, Greatest Hits Radio Staffordshire & Cheshire and Moorlands Radio.

=== Newspapers ===
The Sentinel is the local daily newspaper. The weekly Biddulph Chronicle is a sister publication to the Congleton Chronicle.

== Main sights ==
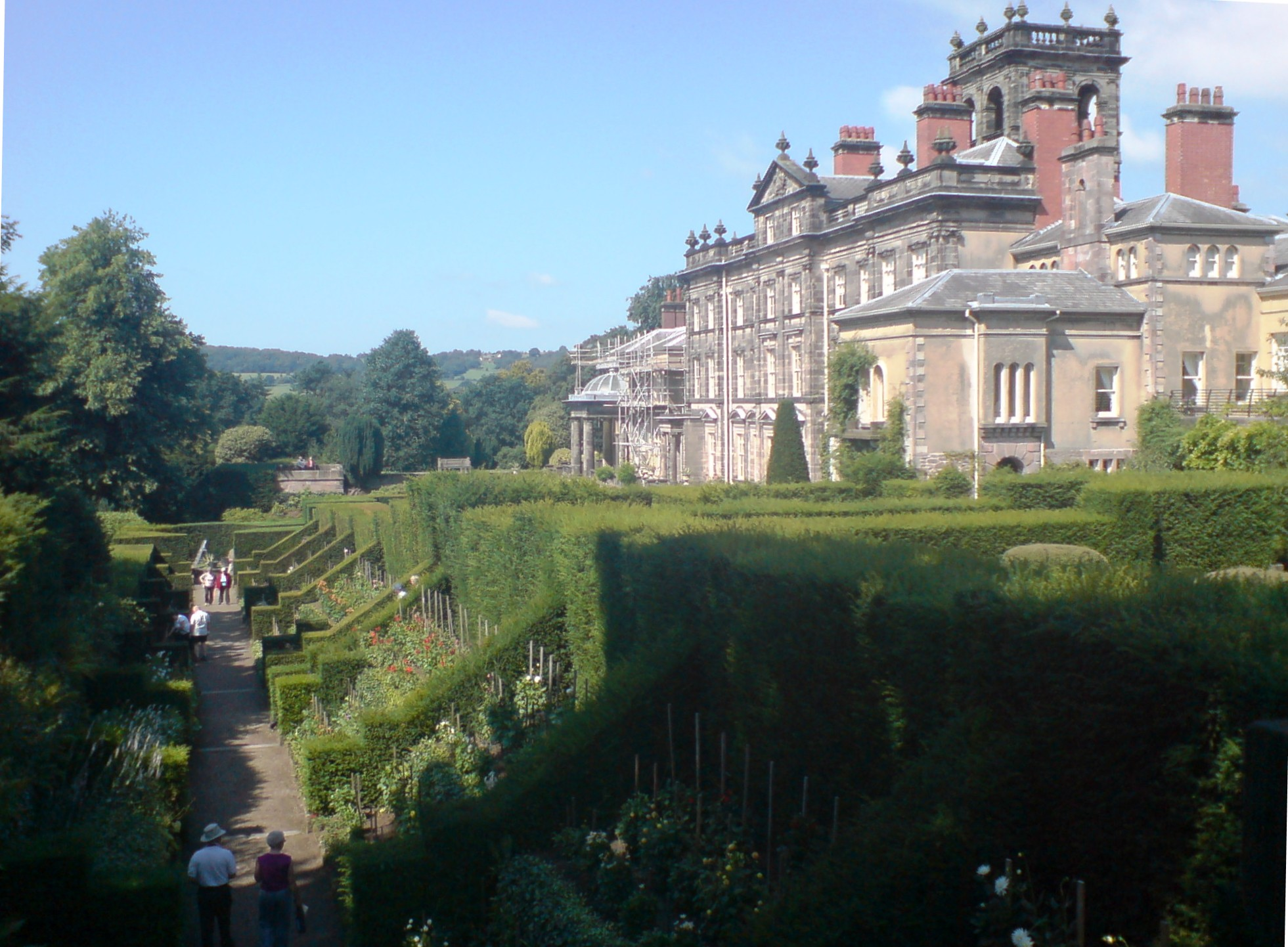
Biddulph Grange

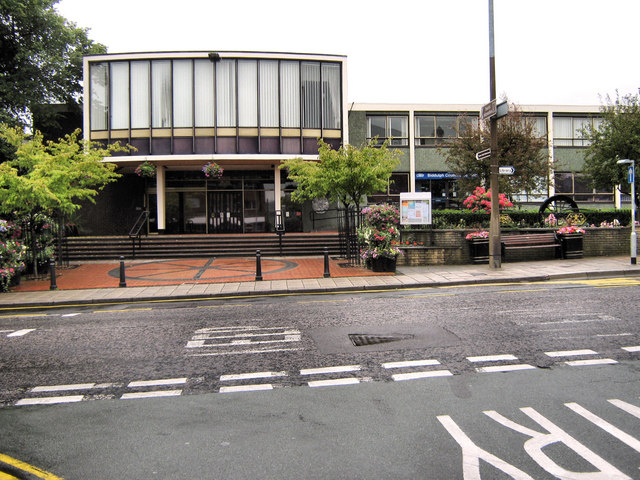
Biddulph Town Hall

Within the valley created by the ridges of Mow Cop and Biddulph Moor, the main sights of note include: ancient burial mounds; evidence of the English Civil War; the bubonic plague; the site of the former Black Bull Colliery; tombs of possible Crusader knights; an Iron Age fort; and the site of a meeting of the Methodist movement with the Wesleys.

A dominant feature on hills above the village is Mow Cop Castle, which is a folly built in the 1750s to look like a medieval fortress and round tower.

Biddulph Grange is a house and landscaped gardens owned by the National Trust. Adjacent to and part of the original estate is Biddulph Grange Country Park.

Biddulph Town Hall was completed in 1965.

== Transport ==
=== Roads ===
Biddulph lies on the A527, which links it to Congleton in the north and Stoke-on-Trent in the south.

=== Buses ===
Two bus companies operate local routes:

- D&G Bus runs services to Hanley, Biddulph Moor, Congleton, Tunstall and Newcastle-under-Lyme.
- First Potteries operates a route to Hanley.

=== Railway ===
The nearest railway stations are at Congleton and Kidsgrove; both are served by Northern Trains, which operates a generally hourly service between Stoke-on-Trent, Macclesfield and Manchester Piccadilly.

The town was previously served by Biddulph railway station, which was opened by the North Staffordshire Railway in 1864. It was a stop on the Biddulph Valley Line that ran from a junction just north of Congleton on the Stoke-on-Trent – Macclesfield line to a junction south of Stoke-on-Trent station. Passenger traffic was withdrawn from the station on 11 July 1927, but freight traffic continued until 5 October 1964.

There was also a canal rail interchange at Congleton Junction; the remains of the small dock on the Macclesfield Canal can still be seen. Parts of the station platform are extant and one of the original buildings is now a private residence. The trackbed now forms the Biddulph Valley Way.

== Notable people ==
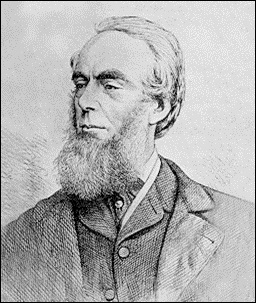
James Bateman

- James Bateman (1811–1897) landowner and horticulturist, developed Biddulph Grange
- Robert Bateman (1842–1922) painter, architect and horticultural designer.
- Jack Simcock (1929–2012) painter, studied at Burslem School of Art, known for "a long series of bleak, sombre oils on board" of the Mow Cop area
- Professor Brian Scarlett (1938–2004) academic noted for his contributions to particle technology
- Joan Walley (born 1949) Labour Party politician, MP for Stoke-on-Trent North 1987–2015.

=== Sport ===
- John Archer (born 1941), footballer, played 335 games for teams including Port Vale, Crewe Alexandra and Chesterfield FC
- John Farmer (born 1947) former footballer, made 163 appearances for Stoke City F.C.
- Malcolm Bailey (born 1950) former footballer, 174 appearances for Altrincham F.C.
- Phil Dowd (born 1963) retired football referee
- Rob Bailey (born 1963) cricket umpire and former player for Northants & England
- James Wilson (born 1995) footballer, plays for Northampton Town and previously played for Manchester United.

== Twin towns ==
Biddulph is twinned with:

- Fusignano, Italy

== Freeman ==
The following person was listed as a Freeman of Biddulph and when the title was bestowed.

- Tony Hall (2023)

== See also ==
- Listed buildings in Biddulph
