= Knypersley Hall =

Country house in England, UK

Coordinates: 53.1046°N 2.1741°W

Knypersley Hall is an 18th-century Georgian style country mansion at Biddulph, Staffordshire, England. It is protected as a Grade II* listed building. After falling into a state of disrepair it was partially subdivided into residential apartments, although the hall was not wholly restored at this point and was falling into further disrepair. However, the current owner has restored, repaired and divided into three separate residential dwellings – Knypersley Hall (the grand hall proper), East View and West View which complement the remainder of the original buildings which were part of the original Hall Estate (The Chapel, Rose Cottage, The Workshop and The Coach House).

The Manor of Knypersley was held by the de Knypersley family from ancient times, until Katherine de Knypersley, heiress to the estates, married Thomas Bowyer late in the 14th century. Several branches of the Bowyer family became Bowyer baronets.

In the 18th century the old manor house was replaced by the Bowyers. The substantial three-storey, seven bay mansion then erected was remodelled about 1847 when the top storey was removed.

The Bowyer Baronetcy became extinct with the death of the 4th Baronet in 1702. His daughter and heiress Dorothy married Sir Thomas Gresley Bt in 1719. See Gresley baronets. The Gresleys sold the estate in about 1809 to the noted horticulturist John Bateman, who developed the gardens but who in about 1840 moved to begin a larger project with his son James Bateman at Biddulph Grange.

The Grade II listed stable block has also been converted into dwellings.
