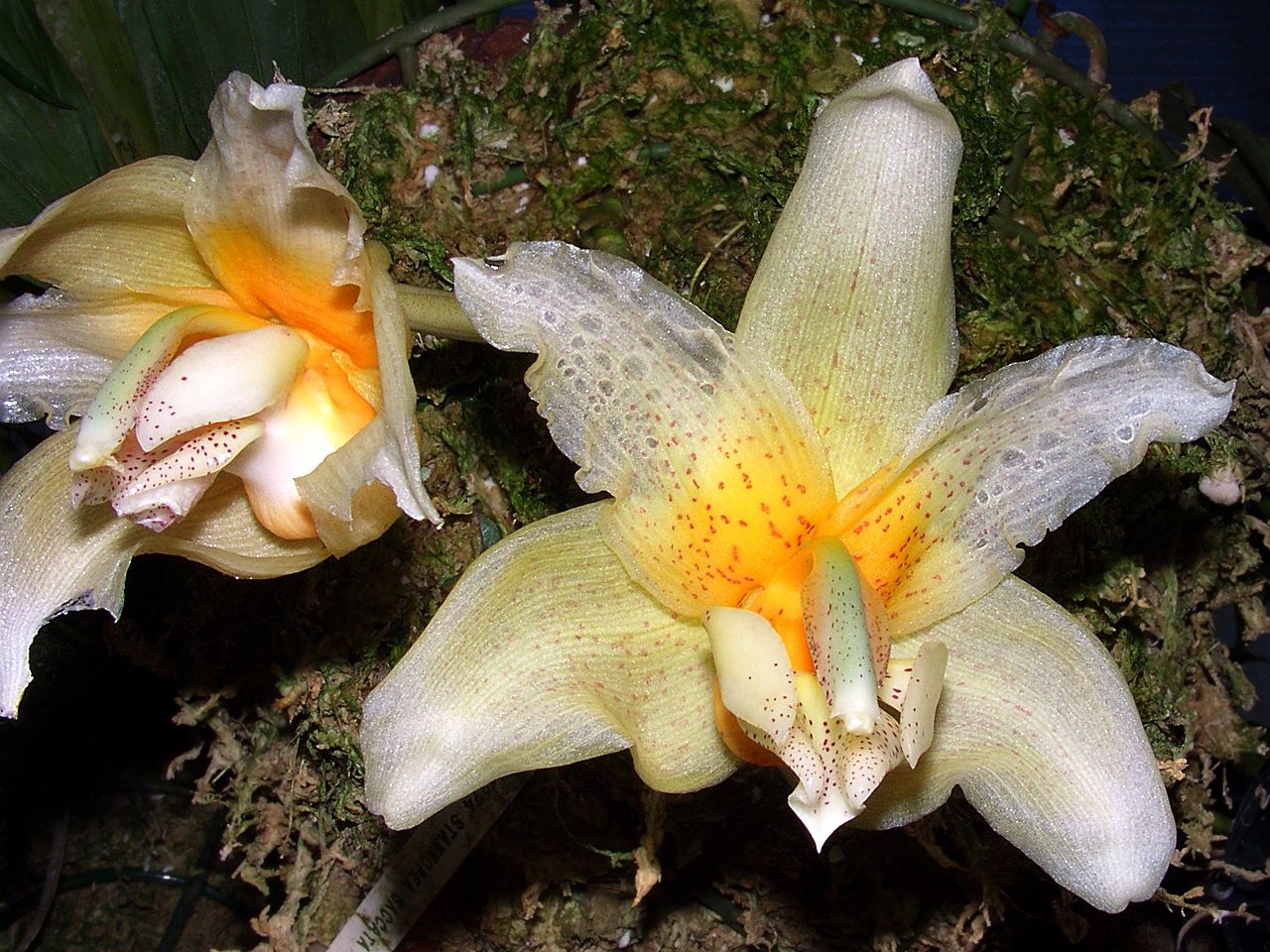
- Stanhopea saccata flower

Scientific classification
- Kingdom: Plantae
- Clade: Tracheophytes
- Clade: Angiosperms
- Clade: Monocots
- Order: Asparagales
- Family: Orchidaceae
- Subfamily: Epidendroideae
- Genus: Stanhopea
- Species: S. saccata

Binomial name
- Stanhopea saccata Bateman

Synonyms
- Stanhopea elegantula Rolfe

= Stanhopea saccata =

Species of orchid

Stanhopea saccata is a species of orchid located from Mexico (Oaxaca, Chiapas) to Central America. It is very similar to Stanhopea radiosa.
