= Biddulph Town Hall =

Municipal building in Biddulph, Staffordshire, England

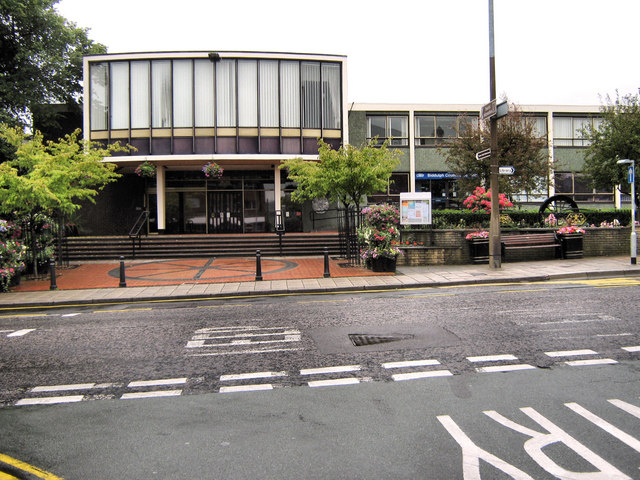
- The building in 2009

- Shown in Staffordshire
- 53.1166°N 2.1753°W
- Location: High Street, Biddulph

History
- Built: 1966

Site notes
- Architectural style: Modern style

Biddulph Town Hall is a municipal building in the High Street in Biddulph, a town in Staffordshire, in England. It currently serves as the meeting place of Biddulph Town Council and as a venue for concerts and other public events.

== History ==
Following significant population growth, largely associated with the mining industry, a local board of health was formed in the area in 1882. After the local board of health was replaced by Biddulph Urban District Council in 1894, the new council established its offices on the east side of the High Street.

In the early 1960s, council leaders decided to demolish the existing offices and to erect a modern town hall on the same site. The staff relocated to temporary offices while the construction work, which was budgeted at £72,000, was undertaken. The new building was designed in the modern style, built in concrete and glass and was officially opened in May 1966.

The design involved an asymmetrical main frontage of six bays facing onto the High Street. The left-hand bay featured a prominent glazed section which was projected out over the pavement on piers, with an entrance below. The right-hand section of five bays was fenestrated by casement windows on both floors. The whole structure was flat roofed. Internally, the principal room was the council chamber on the first floor.

The town hall ceased to be the local seat of government when the enlarged Staffordshire Moorlands Council was formed in 1974. The new council continued to use the offices, while also providing space for a police station in the building. In 1983, a wheel from Victoria Colliery was placed outside the building, to commemorate the town's history.

In 2016, the ground floor was remodelled, with work including a glazed extension to the main reception. In 2020, Biddulph Town Council took over management of the town hall, including arrangements for concerts and other public events.
