= Biddulph High School =

Location
- Conway Road; Knypersley; Biddulph; Staffordshire, ST8 7AR; England
- Coordinates: 53.10534°N 2.1694°W

Information
- Type: Academy
- Local authority: Staffordshire
- Trust: Potteries Educational Trust
- Department for Education URN: 137356 Tables
- Ofsted: Reports
- Headteacher: Elizabeth Robinson
- Gender: Mixed
- Age: 13 to 18
- Enrolment: 774 as of December 2015
- Website: http://www.biddulph.staffs.sch.uk/

Biddulph High School is a mixed upper school (termed 'high school') and sixth form located in the Knypersley area of Biddulph in the English county of Staffordshire.

Previously a community school administered by Staffordshire County Council, Biddulph High School converted to academy status in September 2011. However the school continues to coordinate with Staffordshire County Council for admissions.

Biddulph High School offers GCSEs and BTECs as programmes of study for pupils, while students in the sixth form have the option to study from a range of A-levels and further BTECs.
