= Listed buildings in Biddulph =

Biddulph is a civil parish in the district of Staffordshire Moorlands, Staffordshire, England. It contains 61 listed buildings that are recorded in the National Heritage List for England. Of these, six are at Grade II*, the middle of the three grades, and the others are at Grade II, the lowest grade. The parish contains the town of Biddulph and the surrounding area. In the parish is Biddulph Grange, a country house, which is listed together with a number of decorative features in its garden and grounds. The other listed buildings include houses and associated features, cottages, farm houses and farm buildings, churches and items in churchyards, a wayside cross, three milestones, a drinking trough, a tower, the engine house of a former coal mine, a school, almshouses, bridges, and two war memorials.

== Key ==
Grade	Criteria
II*	Particularly important buildings of more than special interest
II	Buildings of national importance and special interest

== Buildings ==
Name and location	Photograph	Date	Notes	Grade
Shepherds Cross; 53.14097°N 2.15647°W		14th century (possible)	The cross is in stone with a square plan, and is about 1.2 metres (3 ft 11 in) high. It has a cross-shaped head and incisions on the front. The cross is also a scheduled monument.	II
Gillowfold Farmhouse; 53.12432°N 2.17289°W	—	15th century	The farmhouse, originally with cruck construction, was extended in 1676 and again in the 18th century. The older parts are in stone, the later part is in red brick with dentilled eaves, and the roofs have blue tiles. There are two storeys and a T-shaped plan, the older part forming a gabled cross-wing on the right, with a later range to the left, and extensions at the rear. The older part has a south front of four bays and contains chamfered mullioned windows. The later range has a west front of three bays, sash windows with keystones, and a central doorway with a pulvinated frieze and a pediment. Inside, is a large cruck truss.	II
Red Cross, St John's Church; 53.10854°N 2.17968°W	—	15th century (or earlier)	The cross is in the churchyard, it is in stone, and about 1.5 metres (4 ft 11 in) high. It has a rectangular shaft, and at the top is a roundel carved with a cross. The cross is not in its original site.	II
St Lawrence's Church, coffin lids and benches 53.12823°N 2.16594°W		15th century	Apart from the tower, the church was largely rebuilt in 1833, it was extended in 1873, and altered in 1894. It is in Perpendicular style, and built in red sandstone, the roofs of the aisles are leaded, and the rest of the roofs are in blue tiles. The church consists of a nave with a clerestory, a south porch, a chancel, north and south chapels, and a west tower. The tower has four stages, with diagonal buttresses, and an embattled parapet; the nave and aisles also have embattled parapets. Between the bays of the south aisle are seven coffin lids set as benches.	II*
Weeping Cross, St Lawrence's Church; 53.12808°N 2.16590°W		15th century (possible)	The cross is in the churchyard, and it was restored in the 19th century. It is in stone and about 3 metres (9.8 ft) high. There is a base of three steps, a square plinth chamfered at the top to become octagonal, on which is a chamfered square shaft, and a head block surmounted by a small cross on a pyramidal base.	II
Whitehouse Cottage; 53.11965°N 2.18270°W		Late 15th century	The cottage, which has since been altered, is timber framed with cruck construction on a sandstone plinth, with wattle and daub and painted brick infill, and a thatched roof. There is one storey and an attic, four bays, and extensions to the sides and the rear. The windows are casements, and there are two dormers with the thatch swept over them. Inside, there are three cruck truss frames.	II
Greenhouse Farmhouse; 53.10714°N 2.12916°W	—	17th century	The farmhouse, which was extended in the 19th century, is in stone with a raised string course, and has a blue tile roof with verge parapets on shaped kneelers. The original part has two storeys and an attic and a front of three bays, to the left is a later two-storey single-bay extension, and to the right is a single-storey wing. The windows have chamfered mullions.	II
Crowborough Farmhouse; 53.10899°N 2.14368°W	—	1664	The farmhouse, which was altered in the 19th century, is in stone, partly rendered, and has a blue tile roof. There are two storeys and a cellar, and three bays. The windows are replacement casements in chamfered surrounds, and the cellar has a mullioned window.	II
Biddulph Old Hall; 53.13874°N 2.16036°W	—	Late 17th century	A farmhouse attached to the ruins of an Elizabethan mansion, it was later extended. The farmhouse is in sandstone, and has a stone slate roof with verge parapets. There are two storeys and an attic, on the front is a projecting massive chimney stack, with two bays to the eight, and two bays and a lean-to porch to the right. The windows have moulded surrounds and chamfered mullions. A three-storey link leads to screen walls and the octagonal and domed tower of the original building. The ruins, but not the 17th-century house, are a scheduled monument.	II*
Overton Hall; 53.15187°N 2.15893°W	—	Late 17th century	The farmhouse, which was extended in the 19th century and altered in the 20th century, is in sandstone with a string course, and has a stone slate roof with verge parapets on shaped kneelers. There are two storeys and an attic, and a T-shaped plan. The older part to the left has four bays, the left two bay projecting under a gable, and containing casement windows in chamfered surrounds. To the right is a later two-storey, two-bay extension, with a round-headed stair window to the left, and casement windows, one mullioned.	II
Chest tomb, St Lawrence's Church; 53.12799°N 2.16603°W		Late 17th or early 18th century	The chest tomb is in the churchyard, and is in stone. It has plain sides, a projecting moulded cornice, and a top slab inset in slate, The inscription is lost.	II
Knypersley Hall; 53.10458°N 2.17407°W	—	Early to mid-18th century	The house was reduced and remodelled in the 19th century. It is in roughcast brick and has a hipped slate roof. There are two storeys and a south front of eight bays, the outer bays forming two-storey three-bay bay windows. The middle two bays contain a round-headed doorway with a fanlight, and round-headed sash windows with keystones.	II*
Barn northeast of Higher Overton Farmhouse; 53.14907°N 2.15621°W	—	1740	The barn is in stone with a blue tile roof, and has two levels, consisting of a hay loft over a stable. There are two bays, and a single-story extension to the right. The barn contains a central doorway with a dated lintel, mullioned casement windows, and circular pitching eyes.	II
Higher Overton Farmhouse; 53.14895°N 2.15656°W	—	18th century	The farmhouse, which incorporates earlier material, was altered and extended in the 19th century. It is in stone and has a blue tile roof with verge parapets. There are three storeys, and T-shaped plan, consisting of a front range of three bays, a single-storey extension on the left, and further extensions at the rear. In the centre is a gabled porch, and the windows are mullioned casements.	II
Barn northwest of Higher Overton Farmhouse; 53.14915°N 2.15665°W	—	18th century	The barn, which was later extended, is in stone with quoins, and has a tile roof with verge parapets on the east. There are two ranges of different dates and each range has two levels, consisting of hay lofts over byres. The barn contains pitching holes, top-hung casement windows, a cart opening, and doorways.	II
Milestone outside No. 279 Congleton Road; 53.13373°N 2.16849°W		c. 1770	The milestone is on the west side of the A527 road. It was erected by the New Biddulph Turnpike Trust, it is in gritstone, and has a triangular plan. Most of the inscriptions have been obliterated.	II
Milestone northwest of Overton End Farm; 53.14851°N 2.15230°W		c. 1770	The milestone was erected by the Tunstall and Bosley Turnpike Trust. It is in gritstone, it has a triangular plan, and most of the inscriptions have been obliterated.	II
Milestone outside No. 161 Congleton Road; 53.12306°N 2.16932°W		Late 18th century	The milestone was erected by the Tunstall and Bosley Turnpike Trust. It is in gritstone, it has a triangular plan, and is inscribed with the distances to Congleton, Macclesfield and Newcastle-under-Lyme.	II
Gosling Memorial; 53.12820°N 2.16562°W	—	1823	The memorial is in the churchyard of St Lawrence's Church, and is to the memory of Francis Gosling. It is a chest tomb in stone, and has low-relief decoration to the angles, festooned pedestals, a festooned circular inscription plaque, and a moulded top slab.	II
Drinking trough 53.14091°N 2.15636°W		Early 19th century (possible)	The drinking trough is in stone, and consists of two niches with voussoir blocks and keystones. They are built into a wall with coping ramped up over a pair of corbelled dwarf finials with pyramidal cappings.	II
Ginders Memorial; 53.12831°N 2.16584°W	—	Early 19th century	The memorial is in the churchyard of St Lawrence's Church, and is to the memory of members of the Ginders family. It is a pedestal tomb in stone, and is about 1.6 metres (5 ft 3 in) high. The tomb has an octagonal plinth, oval inscription panels, a double string course below a moulded surbase, and is surmounted by an urn with gadrooned draping and a finial.	II
Barn 10 metres south of Overton Hall; 53.15160°N 2.15900°W	—	Early 19th century	The barn is in sandstone, and has a blue tile roof with verge parapets. There is one storey and a loft, and a front of about 20 metres (66 ft). It contains two square-pane windows, vent slits, a doorway, and a loft door in the gable end with a three-tier dovecote above.	II
Prospect Tower and wing, Knypersley; 53.09521°N 2.15551°W		1828	The tower is in stone on a plinth, with quoins and a machicolated parapet. It has an octagonal plan and three stages, and contains a datestone. The windows have round-arched lights and hood moulds, and most have mullions. Attached to the tower is a short link leading to a wing.	II*
Entrance arch, wall and gates, St Lawrence's Church; 53.12821°N 2.16622°W		1835	The south entry to the churchyard consists of a stone archway with traceried spandrels flanked by buttresses, a cornice with florets, and an embattled parapet raised over central date panels. The west entry is similar, but with a Tudor arch. The wall enclosing the churchyard is in stone, about 1.5 metres (4 ft 11 in) high, with steeply pitch coping.	II
Engine House at SJ 866 568; 53.10853°N 2.20003°W		Early to mid-19th century	The engine house of the former coal mine, which has been restored, is in stone with chamfered eaves, and has an L-shaped plan. The engine house occupied the front block, which has two storeys and three bays, and the single-storey rear wing housed stables or workshops and the winding house. The casement windows and entries have round-arched heads.	II
Spring head basin 53.13166°N 2.16295°W		Early to mid-19th century	The spring head basin, near the entrance to Biddulph Grange, is in stone and in Neo-Norman style. It has pilasters, plain imposts, and a round arch with zig-zag moulding. There is a semicircular niche containing a lion-head spout, over which are voussoir blocks. The basin is circular and has a moulded rim.	II
St John's Church, Knypersley; 53.10854°N 2.17938°W		1848–51	The church was designed by R. C. Hussey in early Decorated style. It is built in sandstone, and has blue tile roofs. The church consists of a nave, a south transept, a chancel, and a northwest steeple. The steeple has a tower with three stages, angle buttresses, a pointed north doorway, gargoyles at the corners, a broach spire with lucarnes, and a cross finial.	II
Chinese Bridge, Biddulph Grange; 53.12920°N 2.16192°W		1848–60	An ornamental feature in the Chinese Garden of Biddulph Grange Garden, it is a footbridge in painted wood. Two flights of steps with open threads lead up to a central suspended landing. The approaches have newels with pinnacles, and balustrading with flat balusters.	II
Chinese Temple and tunnel, Biddulph Grange; 53.12930°N 2.16198°W		1848–60	An ornamental feature in the Chinese Garden of Biddulph Grange Garden, it is in timber and stone. There is a screen wall, with the temple to the right on a plinth, and a two-tier pagoda roof with upturned eaves. The screen wall conceals the access to a tunnel.	II
Spring head basin, Biddulph Grange; 53.12909°N 2.16154°W		1848–60	An ornamental feature in Biddulph Grange Garden, it is in stone, and consists of two chamfered column bases between which is a circular basin. Above it is a moulded lintel.	II
Steps and approach to Bateman's study, Biddulph Grange; 53.12979°N 2.16234°W		1848–60	There are three tiers, five flights of steps, and four landings, flanked by balustrades with moulded and panelled end piers. The back wall has a round-arched niche, and a fretted balustrade, in front of which is a circular vase on a plinth.	II
The Alcove and steps, Biddulph Grange; 53.12959°N 2.16299°W		1848–60	An ornamental feature in Biddulph Grange Garden at the north end of Lime Avenue, it is in stone. Three steps lead up to the seating alcove, which has an elliptically-shaped cover about 2 metres (6 ft 7 in) wide carried on moulded and panelled square columns. The rear wall has three panels, and the alcove contains a seat on shaped legs.	II
The Great Wall of China, Biddulph Grange; 53.12878°N 2.16067°W		1848–60	An ornamental feature in the Chinese Garden of Biddulph Grange Garden, it consists of two stone walls about 2.5 metres (8 ft 2 in) high. The walls are finished to appear ruinous, and they contain two round-arched gateways.	II
The Joss House, Biddulph Grange; 53.12917°N 2.16167°W		1848–60	An ornamental feature in the Chinese Garden of Biddulph Grange Garden, it consists of a painted wooden shelter. It has a single cell, upturned eaves, a crested ridge, and an opening with a cusped arch.	II
The Prospect Tower and steps, Biddulph Grange; 53.12927°N 2.16159°W		1848	An ornamental feature in the Chinese Garden of Biddulph Grange Garden, it is a stone tower, finished to appear ruinous. It is about 5 metres (16 ft) high, with a square plan, and two stages. The tower is approached by a random spiral of stone steps.	II
The walled garden, portals and sculpture, Biddulph Grange; 53.12928°N 2.16185°W		1848–60	An ornamental feature in the Chinese Garden of Biddulph Grange Garden, the stone walls form a semicircle with a diameter of about 10 metres (33 ft) and they are about 1.5 metres (4 ft 11 in) high. At each end is a double-headed portal built from blocks, and in the centre is a life-size plaster sculpture of a Brahmin cow under a canopy. In front of the wall are two serpent forms cut into the lawn.	II
Tunnel entrance, Biddulph Grange; 53.12887°N 2.16240°W		1848–60	An ornamental feature near the Chinese Garden of Biddulph Grange Garden, the tunnel entrance is formed by natural boulders forming an arch. The tunnel is about 2 metres (6 ft 7 in) high and 12 metres (39 ft) long. The south entry has a keystone apparently flanked by hands.	II
Fairhaven; 53.10887°N 2.17998°W	—	c. 1850	A vicarage designed by R. C. Hussey and later used for other purposes, it is in stone, and has a blue tile roof with verge parapets and shouldered and stepped kneelers. The building is in Jacobean style, and has two storeys, an H-shaped plan, with a front of five bays, the outer bays projecting and gabled. To the left of the central range is a porch that rises to form a tower with a cornice and a balustrade. It contains a round-arched entrance with pilasters, and above it is an elaborate carved plaque. The windows are sashes with mullions and cornices, and there is a cross window and a gabled half-dormer.	II
Coach House and wall, Fairhaven; 53.10916°N 2.17991°W	—	c. 1850	The coach house, designed by R. C. Hussey, is in stone, and has a blue tile roof with verge parapets on corbelled kneelers. The gabled front has two storeys, and contains a coach doorway with an elliptical arch, above which is a window with a chamfered surround. Running from the coach house is a stable yard wall about 7 metres (23 ft) high with pitched coping, containing an entrance and a doorway.	II
Coachman's House and wall, Fairhaven; 53.10925°N 2.18051°W	—	c. 1850	The house, possibly with an earlier core, was designed by R. C. Hussey. It is in stone and has a blue tile roof with verge parapets on corbelled kneelers. There is a single storey, three bays, and a lower wing to the left. The middle bay projects, with a gablet and a finial, and it contains a Tudor arched doorway and a circular window above. The other windows are mullioned casements. To the north and the east is a stable yard wall, about 2 metres (6 ft 7 in) high, and containing an entrance.	II
Entrance screen, gateway and gates, Fairhaven; 53.10880°N 2.17970°W	—	c. 1850	The screen wall is behind the boundary wall, and was designed by R. C. Hussey. It is in stone with steeply pitched coping, and is about 1.5 metres (4 ft 11 in) high and 20 metres (66 ft) long. In the centre is a gateway with panelled and corniced pillars surmounted by obelisks, and between them are panelled timber gates.	II
Knypersley School, archway and wall 53.10810°N 2.18071°W		1850	The school, designed by R. C. Hussey, is in stone, and has a blue tile roof with verge parapets on corbelled kneelers. It has an E-shaped plan, and at the front is a single-storey range containing a gabled porch flanked by two-storey gabled wings containing bay windows. On the roof is a belfry with a pyramidal roof, and the windows are mullioned and transomed. The porch has a round-headed entry, and above it is an inscribed banner carved in relief. To the left is an archway, and in front of the school is a low wall with moulded coping on piers with circular pattern cut-outs between them.	II
Almshouses, wall and railings 53.13153°N 2.16221°W		Mid-19th century	The almshouses are in red brick with stone dressings, polychrome brick friezes, and stone quoins, and they have a tile roof with verge parapets on shaped kneelers. There is a symmetrical front with a two-storey central gabled bay, and single-storey links to single-storey gabled end bays. The windows are mullioned, and the middle bay has a mullioned and transomed window. The boundary wall contains a Tudor arched gateway, a pier with a pyramidal cap, and cast iron railings on a plinth.	II
Bridge, Biddulph Grange; 53.13091°N 2.15419°W	—	Mid-19th century	An ornamental bridge over a stream in the grounds of the hall, it is in stone, and consists of a single segmental arch. The bridge has parapet walls with carved ends, rounded piers, and plain coping.	II
Bridge near Grange Road; 53.13346°N 2.16201°W	—	Mid-19th century	An ornamental bridge over a stream, it is in stone, and consists of a single elliptical arch. The bridge has panelled parapet walls with moulded coping, and end piers supported by volutes.	II
Garden gateway, Biddulph Grange; 53.12792°N 2.16581°W	—	Mid-19th century	The entrance to the garden is in stone, it is about 3 metres (9.8 ft) high, and has an ogee-moulded plinth. It contains a Tudor arched doorway and a string course ending in ball flowers. At the top is stepped pitched coping over a panel containing a coat of arms.	II
Overton Road entrance, Biddulph Grange; 53.13111°N 2.16372°W	—	Mid-19th century	The entrance consists of gates, gate piers, walls, and a pedestrian entry in stone, apart from the gates. The piers are panelled and have moulded cappings and vase-shaped finials, and the gates are in timber. The pedestrian entry has a square-headed opening, vermiculated and rusticated surrounds, a cornice, and an urn finial. Between these are walls, and a short run of cast iron railings.	II
The Vase, Biddulph Grange; 53.12839°N 2.15480°W		Mid-19th century	An ornament in the garden of the house, it is in stone, and about 2 metres (6 ft 7 in) high. It consists of a circular plinth, a moulded stem. and a bowl with a diameter of about 1.5 metres (4 ft 11 in).	II
Elmhurst; 53.13511°N 2.15337°W	—	Mid-19th century	A stone house with an eaves cornice and blocking course, and a tile roof with verge parapets and finials. There are two storeys, two parallel ranges, and four bays, the outer bays projecting and gabled. The central doorway has a moulded surround and a pointed arch, and above it is a shield plaque. The windows in the middle bays are mullioned, and in the outer bays they are mullioned and transomed. To the right is a recessed two-bay wing with a moulded parapet.	II
Stables, houses, and lodge north of Knypersley Hall; 53.10498°N 2.17378°W	—	Mid-19th century	A range of buildings extending for nine bays with a tile roof. At the centre is a two-storey stone dovecote pavilion with a modillion cornice and a hipped pyramidal roof in Italianate style, and this is flanked by single-storey stables. At the left end is a coach house wing at right angles containing a coachman's cottage and a carriageway. At the right end is a stone lodge in Gothic style, with one storey and an attic, coped gables and a finial.	II
Barn 30 metres south of Overton Hall; 53.15147°N 2.15878°W	—	Mid-19th century	The barn, which incorporates earlier material, is in stone with a blue tile roof, and has two levels, consisting of a hay loft over a byre. It contains two top-hung casement windows, and two rows of seven slit vents.	II
Coach House, St Lawrence's Church; 53.12809°N 2.16555°W	—	Mid-19th century	The coach house and lodging in the churchyard is in stone on a plinth, with a moulded eaves band and a blue tile roof. There is a single storey, it is about 15 metres (49 ft) long, and contains mullioned windows, a Tudor arched doorway, a coach door with an elliptical head, and a hay hole with a keyed architrave above.	II
The Moor House; 53.13758°N 2.15248°W	—	Mid-19th century	The house, later divided into flats, is in stone, and has a tile roof with verge parapets and finials. It is in two and three storeys, and has a U-shaped plan, with a former service wing on the left, and an entrance wing on the right. The projecting porch has a flat roof, pilasters, a round-arched entrance, and a balustrade. The windows have round heads with transoms, and hoods on corbels. Recessed to the right is a four-stage campanile with buttresses, string courses, a cornice, and a bell chamber with a pyramidal roof.	II
Egyptian portal and sphinxes, Biddulph Grange; 53.12940°N 2.16076°W		c. 1856	An ornamental feature in Biddulph Grange Garden, it is in stone, and consists of two pairs of statues of sphinxes, behind which is an Egyptian-style portico that has a coved lintel carved with a pseudo-Pharaonic motif.	II*
The Tea House and tunnel, Biddulph Grange; 53.12943°N 2.16069°W		1856	An ornamental feature in Biddulph Grange Garden, the Tea House is a cottage orné in rendered brick with some timber framing, and has a tile roof with finials and cusped bargeboards. The front has two storeys and is gabled, the upper floor is jettied on corbels, and it contains a three-light casement window flanked by a painted date. The ground floor has a loggia entrance with timber columns framing a central round arch. The entrance leads to a tunnel with a cruciform plan, containing seating apses, one with the seated figure of a baboon.	II
Stone seat and Arbour, Biddulph Grange; 53.12961°N 2.16292°W		c. 1860	An enclosure and adjoining bench in the Lime Walk, it is in sandstone. It consists of a stone plinth enclosing an area about 8 metres (26 ft) by 4 metres (13 ft) near which is a stone seat with a panelled back.	II
Squirrel Hayes Lodge; 53.10545°N 2.16310°W	—	c. 1860	A lodge to Biddulph Grange, later a private house, it is in sandstone, and has a tile roof with coped gables and moulded kneelers. There are two storeys, the upper storey jettied, and an L-shaped plan, with the gable facing the road. The east front has three bays, the middle bay with a projecting two-storey porch. The porch has doorway with a quoined surround, a fanlight, and a four-centred arched lintel with an integral hood mould. Most of the windows have mullions, and at the rear is a single-storey L-shaped wing.	II
Christ Church, Biddulph Moor; 53.12209°N 2.14032°W		1863	The church is in stone with blue tile roofs, and is in Neo-Norman style. It consists of a nave, a west porch, a north transept, a chancel with an apse, and a chapel. Above the porch at the west end is a rose window, and on the gable end is a gabled bellcote.	II
Biddulph Grange; 53.12989°N 2.16213°W		1896	A country house largely replacing an earlier house. It is built mainly in sandstone with lead roofs in English Baroque style, the remaining parts of the older house are in yellow brick with slate roofs, and are in Italianate style. The main part has three storeys and ten bays, with a central pedimented two-bay attic, balustrades and urns. To the left, remaining from the former house is a two-storey wing, including a projecting semicircular domed porch, and to the right is a two-bay wing with round-headed windows and a corbelled balcony.	II*
War Memorial, St Lawrence's Church; 53.12882°N 2.16566°W		1921	The war memorial in the churchyard is in Cornish granite. It consists of a Celtic wheel-head cross on a tapering shaft, on a two-tier tapering plinth, on a base of two steps. On the cross head is knotwork design in relief, and a central boss. On the upper tier of the plinth are inscriptions, and on the lower tier are the names of those lost in the First World War.	II
Biddulph War Memorial; 53.11787°N 2.17415°W	—	1922	The war memorial stands at a road junction, and is in granite with a sculpture in limestone. It has a chamfered base and a square plinth, on which is the statue of a soldier leaning on a rifle with a jagged rock behind him. On the plinth are inscriptions relating to both World Wars, and there are granite plaques with the names of those lost in those and other conflicts. The memorial is enclosed by decorative metal railings.	II
