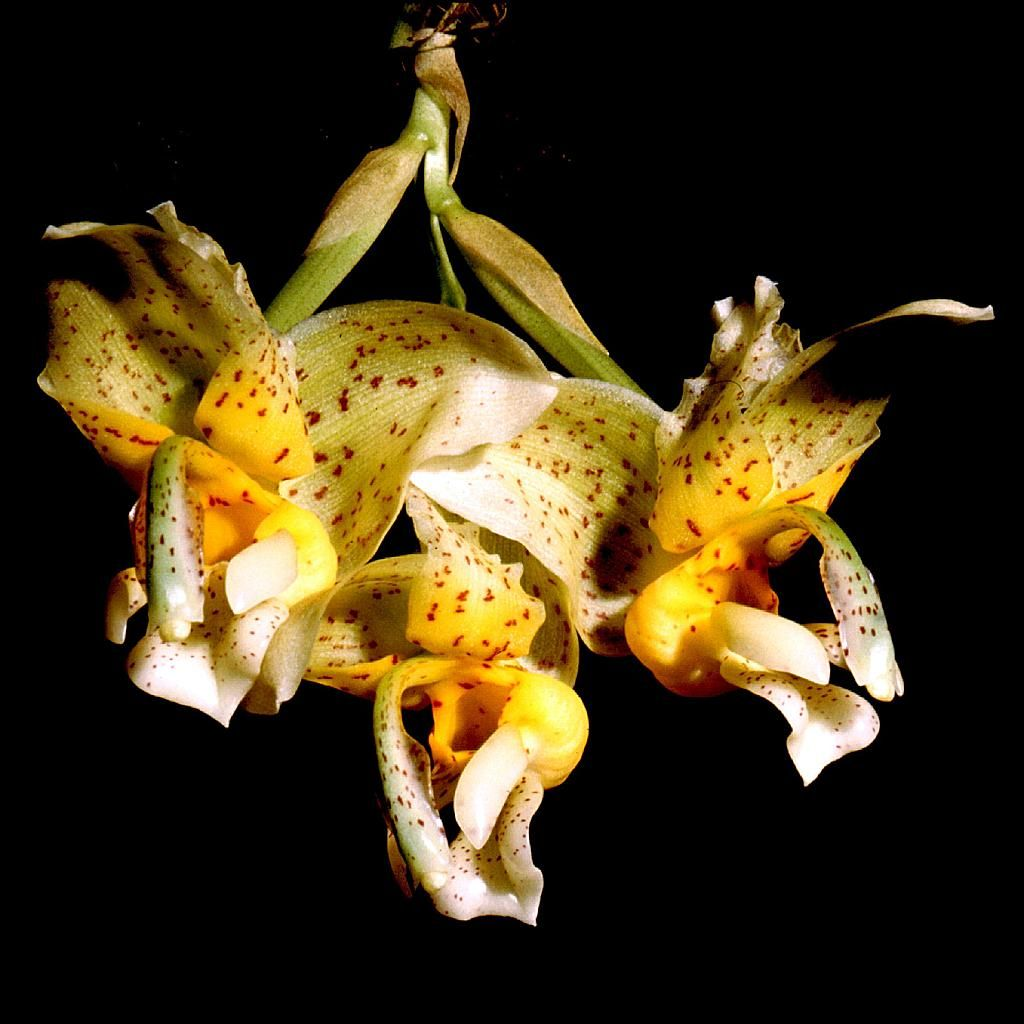
- Stanhopea radiosa flower

Scientific classification
- Kingdom: Plantae
- Clade: Tracheophytes
- Clade: Angiosperms
- Clade: Monocots
- Order: Asparagales
- Family: Orchidaceae
- Subfamily: Epidendroideae
- Genus: Stanhopea
- Species: S. radiosa

Binomial name
- Stanhopea radiosa Lem.

= Stanhopea radiosa =

Species of orchid

Stanhopea radiosa is a species of orchid endemic to western Mexico (to Durango). It is very similar to Stanhopea saccata.
