= The Great Landowners of Great Britain and Ireland =

Reference work published by John Bateman

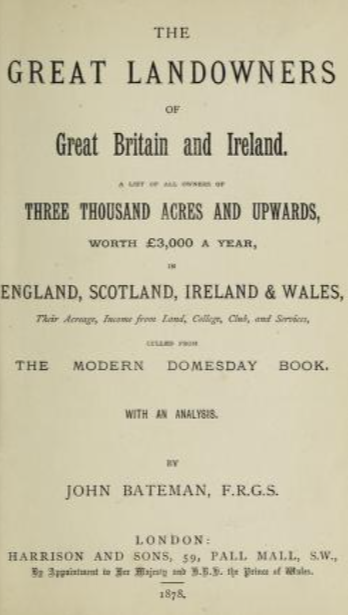
- Title page for The Great Landowners of Great Britain and Ireland (1878)
- Author: John Bateman
- Publisher: Cambridge University Press
- ISBN: 978-1108075954

The Great Landowners of Great Britain and Ireland (originally The Acre-Ocracy of England) is a reference work published by John Bateman in four editions between 1876 and 1883, giving brief details of individuals owning land in the United Kingdom of Great Britain and Ireland to a total of 3,000 acres (1,200 ha) or valuation of £3000 annual income. It has become a standard primary source for historians of the Victorian era.

== Compilation ==
The information was abstracted from the Return of Owners of Land (1873–1876), a government publication nicknamed the "Modern Domesday Book". Bateman collated the county-by-county information, correcting errors, allowing for variations in spelling of surnames, noting with footnotes and asterisks discrepancies and complexities of ownership or income. Owners noted in Evelyn Shirley's Noble and Gentle Men of England as in unbroken inheritance since the reign of Henry VII were given a special mark; later editions also separately marked owners not listed by Shirley but who protested to Bateman that they had the same antiquity.

== John Bateman ==
John Bateman (1839–1910), editor of The Great Landowners of Great Britain and Ireland, lived at Brightlingsea Hall in Essex, and was a justice of the peace and deputy lieutenant for Essex and Staffordshire. In 1865, he married Jessy Caroline Bootle-Wilbraham, sister of Edward Bootle-Wilbraham, 1st Earl of Lathom. They had one daughter.
