= Geological Gallery, Biddulph Grange =

Display corridor at Biddulph Grange, Staffordshire

The Geological Gallery, Biddulph Grange, from the door (and Day 6) to the far end (Day 0)

The Geological Gallery is a display corridor at Biddulph Grange, Staffordshire, created by the botanist and horticulturalist James Bateman in the 19th century to express his religious beliefs about geology and the creation of the earth. The gallery originally had eight bays, the first for the formless world before the six days of creation; the next six for those six days; and the last, for the seventh day when God rested after the creation. The first bay displays igneous rocks; the six days of creation bays display a long sequence of rocks from Paleozoic through Mesozoic to Cenozoic, with fossils of matching ages. The last bay has been lost, its former contents unknown.

== Purpose ==
The botanist and horticulturalist James Bateman expressed his strong religious beliefs in the Geological Gallery at Biddulph Grange. Realising that a long sequence of rocks and fossils implied a great expanse of time before the supposed date of the creation of the world, he opened the gallery, a long straight corridor, to set out his view that the rocks were created by God in six days. He believed that in this way he could prove scientifically that the biblical account of creation was correct.

== Structure ==
A fossil Lepidodendron fragment, the only remaining actual fossil in the Geological Gallery

The Geological Gallery was originally a single corridor some 30.5 metres (100 ft) long, built of squared blocks of "red" Hollington stone (a Triassic sandstone). It is lit only by windows in the roof. It was completed by 1850.

The Geological Gallery is arranged with a sequence of rocks and a sequence of fossils from oldest to youngest along its length to depict geological time with actual specimens. The corridor is marked out in bays (delimited by the roof beams) with an initial unnamed bay, and six bays for the six days of creation, as described in 1862 by the landscape architect Edward Kemp. Day 7, when God rested after creating the world, was originally represented by a final bay, but it was destroyed in the 1930s when the house was taken over as a hospital. Its former contents are unknown.

By 2017, 60 of the 70 original fossils had been lost or removed from the gallery to the Biddulph Grange archive; the rest were removed for cleaning and conservation work. The gallery's environment was considered unsuitable for the specimens, so the fossils originally in the gallery were replaced by casts, except for a fossil fragment of a Lepidodendron tree.

28 of the original set of nearly 100 rocks were lost from the gallery after Bateman's time. Under the National Trust's management, Cliveden Conservation, guided by the British geologist Alan Holiday, identified the sources for the original rocks and replaced them by 2021. Some were donated, as with Holiday's sample of Hertfordshire puddingstone. Some were collected from fallen fragments such as under the sea-cliffs of Aberystwyth Grit from Pembrokeshire, and of Cornbrash from Dorset. Other rocks were purchased from commercial quarries.

James Bateman's alignment of the six days of creation with geological history
Six Days of Creation	King James Version Bible text Book of Genesis	Image of named bay in the gallery	Rocks and fossils for that day of creation in the gallery
(Unnamed)	And the earth was without form, and void; and darkness was upon the face of the deep.		Igneous rocks, no fossils
Day 1	And God said, Let there be light: and there was light... and God divided the light from the darkness.		Early Paleozoic rocks and fossils
Day 2	And God said, Let there be a firmament in the midst of the waters, and let it divide the waters from the waters.		Early Paleozoic rocks and fossils
Day 3	And God said, Let the earth bring forth grass, the herb yielding seed, and the fruit tree yielding fruit after his kind...		Late Paleozoic (Carboniferous) rocks and fossils from the local area
Day 4	And God made two great lights; the greater light to rule the day, and the lesser light to rule the night: he made the stars also.		Early Mesozoic (Triassic, Jurassic) rocks and fossils, with amphibian skull
Day 5	And God created great whales, and every living creature that moveth, which the waters brought forth abundantly, after their kind, and every winged fowl after his kind...		Late Mesozoic (Cretaceous), early Cenozoic, with ichthyosaurs and ammonites
Day 6	Let the earth bring forth the living creature after his kind, cattle, and creeping thing, and beast of the earth after his kind... And God said, Let us make man in our image...		Cenozoic (Tertiary, Quaternary) rocks and fossils, with a mammoth tusk and human skull
(Day 7)	And on the seventh day God ended his work which he had made; and he rested...	?	Bateman's intention not known; bay now lost
