= Biddulph Grange Country Park =

Park in Staffordshire, England

Coordinates: 53°07′45″N 2°09′20″W

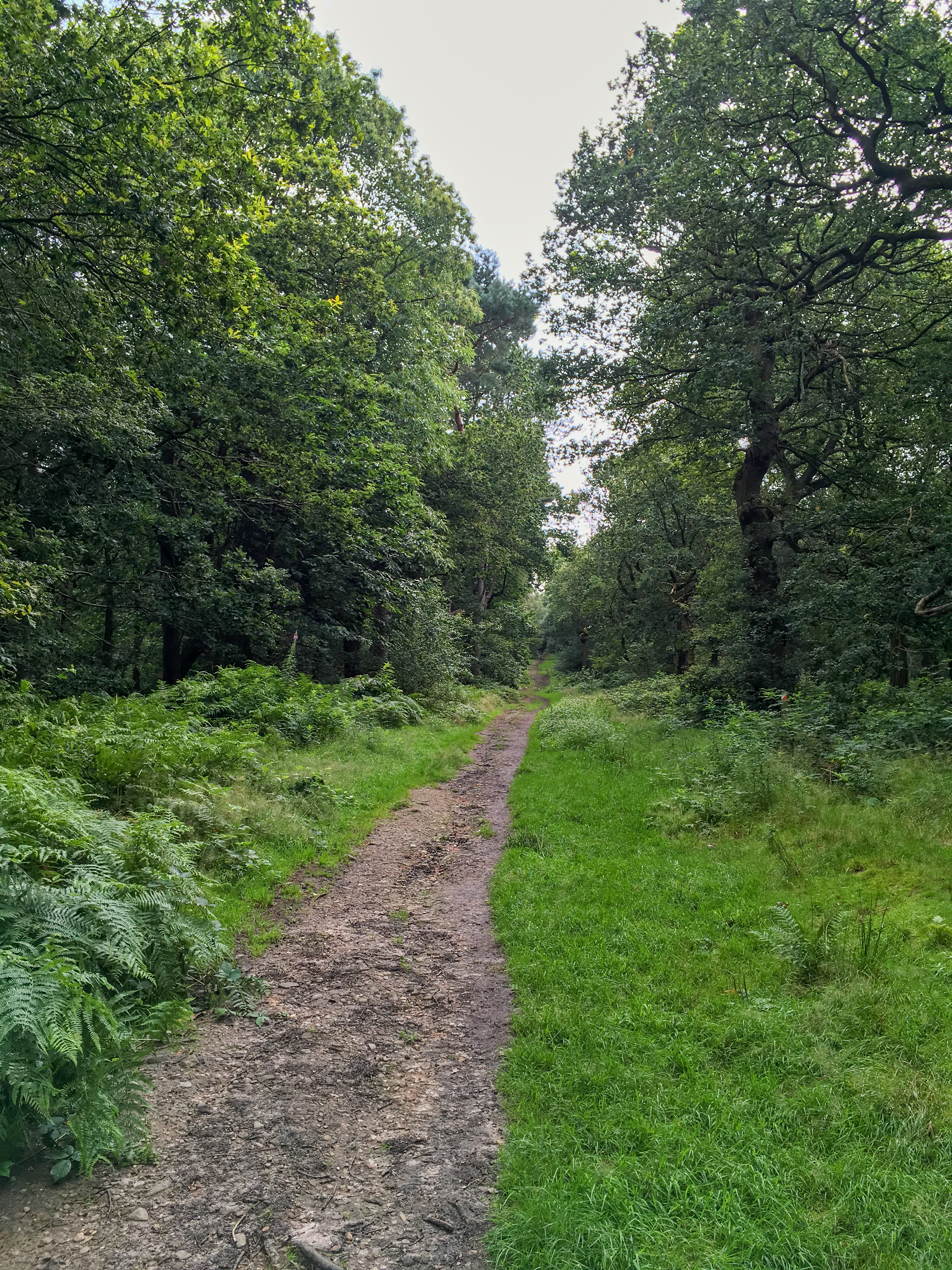
- Part of the Obelisk Walk
- Interactive map of Biddulph Grange Country Park
- Type: country park
- Location: Biddulph, Staffordshire, UK
- Area: 0.3 square kilometres (0.12 sq mi)
- Website: https://www.staffsmoorlands.gov.uk/article/843/Biddulph-Grange-Country-Park

Biddulph Grange Country Park is a country park in Biddulph, Staffordshire, England. It was originally part of Biddulph Grange.

== Contents ==
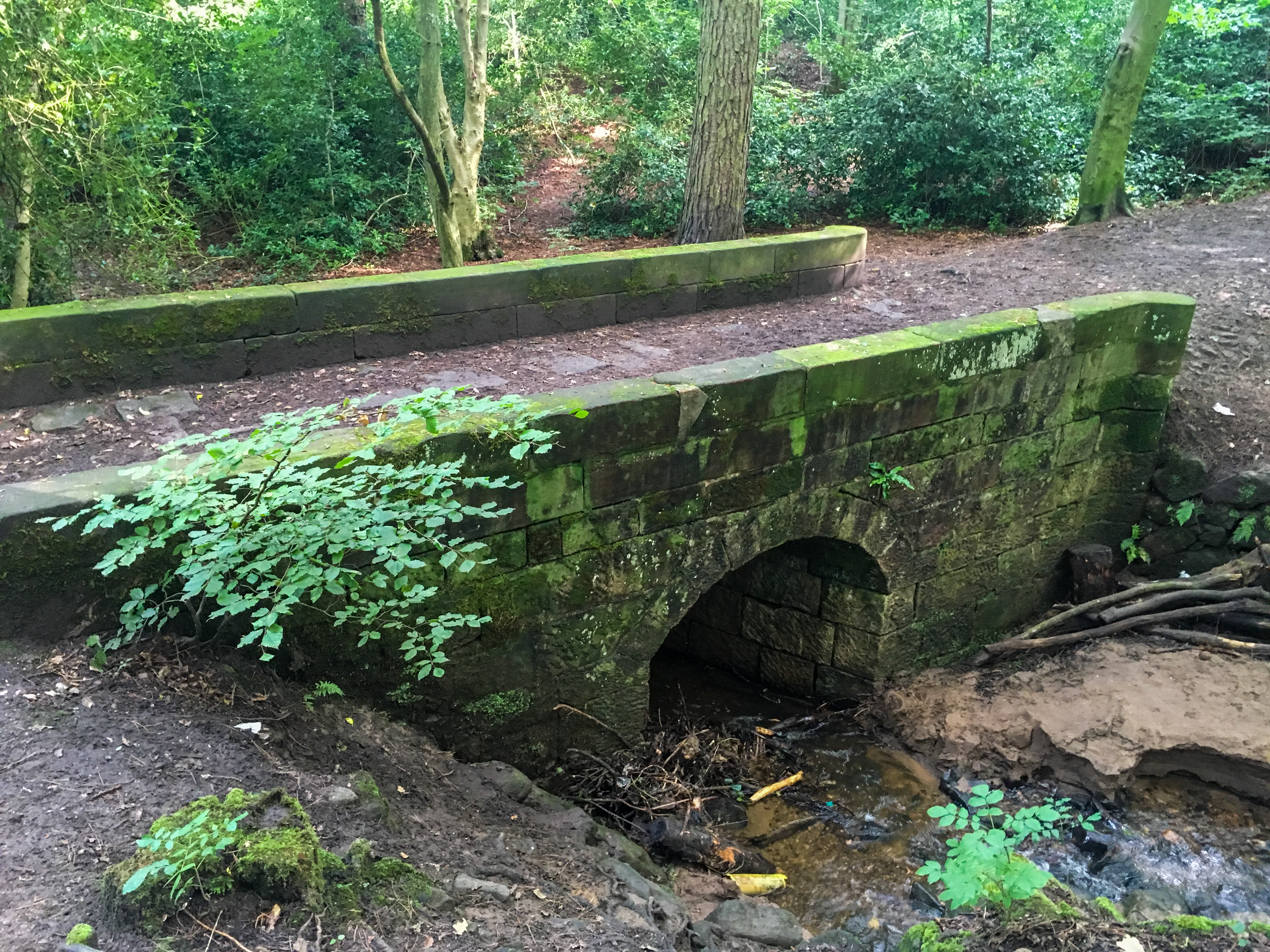
The Grade II listed bridge

The 73 acres (0.30 km^{2}) park consists mostly of woodland, principally the Spring Wood, and open meadows. There is a central lake, with a stone boat house. The park has a visitor centre, with a cafe and toilets, as well as a 40-space car park. There are fishing permits for the central lake, which contains Carp, Crucian Carp, Roach, Perch and Tench.

The park includes 450 metres (1,480 ft) of the Obelisk Walk, a steeply-rising linear walkway that forms an optical illusion of a stone obelisk against a dark sky when viewed from the gates at the end of Wellingtonia Avenue in the Biddulph Grange gardens. There is a cave at the end of the walkway that appears at the top of the obelisk.

There is a Grade II listed ornamental bridge on the Himalayan walk in the park. It is ashlar with plane coping, a segmented arch, rounded piers, and parapet walls with carved ends.

== History ==
The park was originally part of the estate of Biddulph Grange, and was designed in the Victorian era and early 20th century. Biddulph Grange has been Grade I listed since 1984, and the Country Park forms part of that listing.

The stone boat house was built in 1904, and is attached to the large central lake. It has been fully restored.

The ornamental bridge was constructed in the mid 19th century, and was listed on 29 November 2001.

A hydroelectric scheme was installed at the site circa 1900; it was restored in 2000, and is used to provide power to the visitor centre and local area.
