= Braddocks Hay =

Suburb of Biddulph in Staffordshire, England

Coordinates: 53.114245°N 2.169084°W

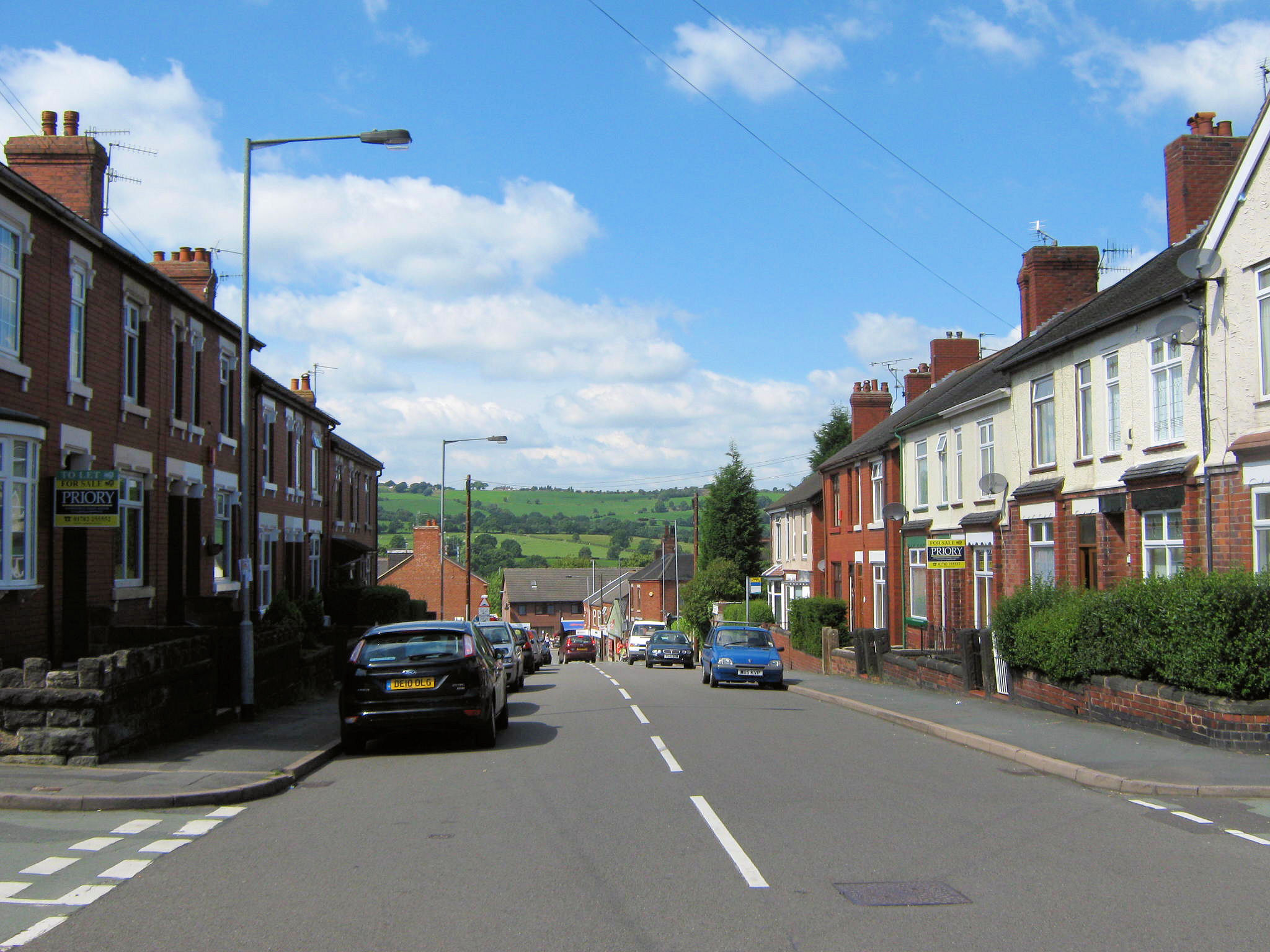
- Well Street, Braddocks Hay, Biddulph

- Location within Staffordshire
- OS grid reference: SJ887574
- Civil parish: Biddulph
- District: Staffordshire Moorlands
- Shire county: Staffordshire
- Region: West Midlands
- Country: England
- Sovereign state: United Kingdom
- Post town: STOKE-ON-TRENT
- Postcode district: ST8
- Police: Staffordshire
- Fire: Staffordshire
- Ambulance: West Midlands
- UK Parliament: Staffordshire Moorlands

Braddocks Hay is a suburb of Biddulph in the Staffordshire Moorlands district of the county of Staffordshire, England. Braddocks Hay is a former hamlet and now forms part of the town of Biddulph.

== History ==
Originally compromising of a single farm, Braddocks Hay remained rural in character until the start of the industrial revolution and the growth of the town of Biddulph. The hamlet became part of the town due to housing developments, industries and coal mines opening in the area around Braddocks Hay.

In 1952, a council estate called "Braddocks Hay" was built with housing, shops and flats. Further integrating the former hamlet into Biddulph and its urban area.

== Amenities ==
Braddocks Hay consists of mostly residential estates and small shops. It is located close to Biddulph town centre for more amenities.

== Transport ==
The area is served by regular bus services, operated by both D&G Bus and First Potteries. With buses to Biddulph, Congleton, Hanley, Kidsgrove, Newcastle-under-Lyme and Stoke-on-Trent.
