= Bateman's Tower =

Grade II listed tower in Brightlingsea, Essex

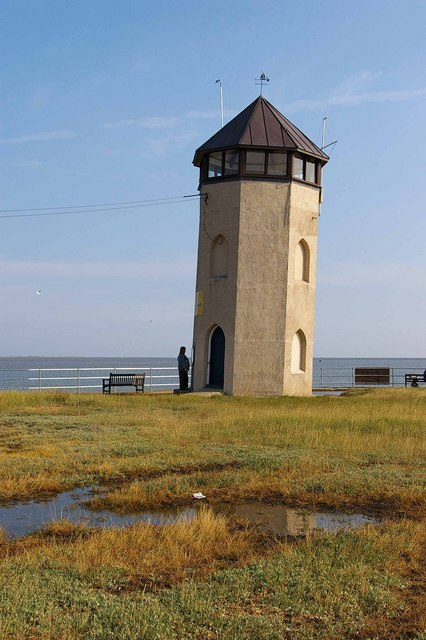
- Bateman's Tower photographed in 2006, shortly after the viewing platform was restored
- Interactive map of the Bateman's Tower area

General information
- Location: Brightlingsea, Essex, England, United Kingdom
- Year built: c. 1880

Bateman's Tower is a 19th century tower in Brightlingsea, Essex, at the mouth of Brightlingsea Creek. It is a grade II listed building, having been added to the register in 1987.

== History ==
The tower was built in c. 1880 for local magnate John Bateman, who was for seven years the town's Cinque Port deputy. The purpose of the tower is not entirely clear. It may have been intended as a lighthouse as part of a planned expansion of Brightlingsea's harbour, however no such expansion took place. Another theory is that the tower was intended as a folly in which Bateman's daughter Agnes could recover from tuberculosis with the benefit of the sea air.

During the Second World War, the tower was requisitioned by the British Army for use as an observation post, and the roof was removed. The tower would remain without a roof until 2005, when a replica roof was constructed and installed. The project was funded via a £28,100 Heritage Lottery grant.

Today the tower is used by a number of local sailing organisations, including the Colne Yacht Club. Plans to build a cafe nearby were given planning permission in 2018, but have been much delayed. The current estimate is that the Bateman's Tower Cafe will open in the summer of 2026.

== Description ==
Bateman's Tower is a two-story octagonal cement tower, topped by a wooden viewing structure with a copper-faced roof; the viewing structure is a 2005 replica. The tower itself has two centred arched windows per floor on alternate faces, all of which are currently blocked up except for the first floor's sea-facing window.

Bundles of wood were used for the tower's foundations, and it soon began to lean. As such, it has been nicknamed the 'leaning tower of Brightlingsea', after the famous Leaning Tower of Pisa.
