= Robert Bateman (artist) =

British painter

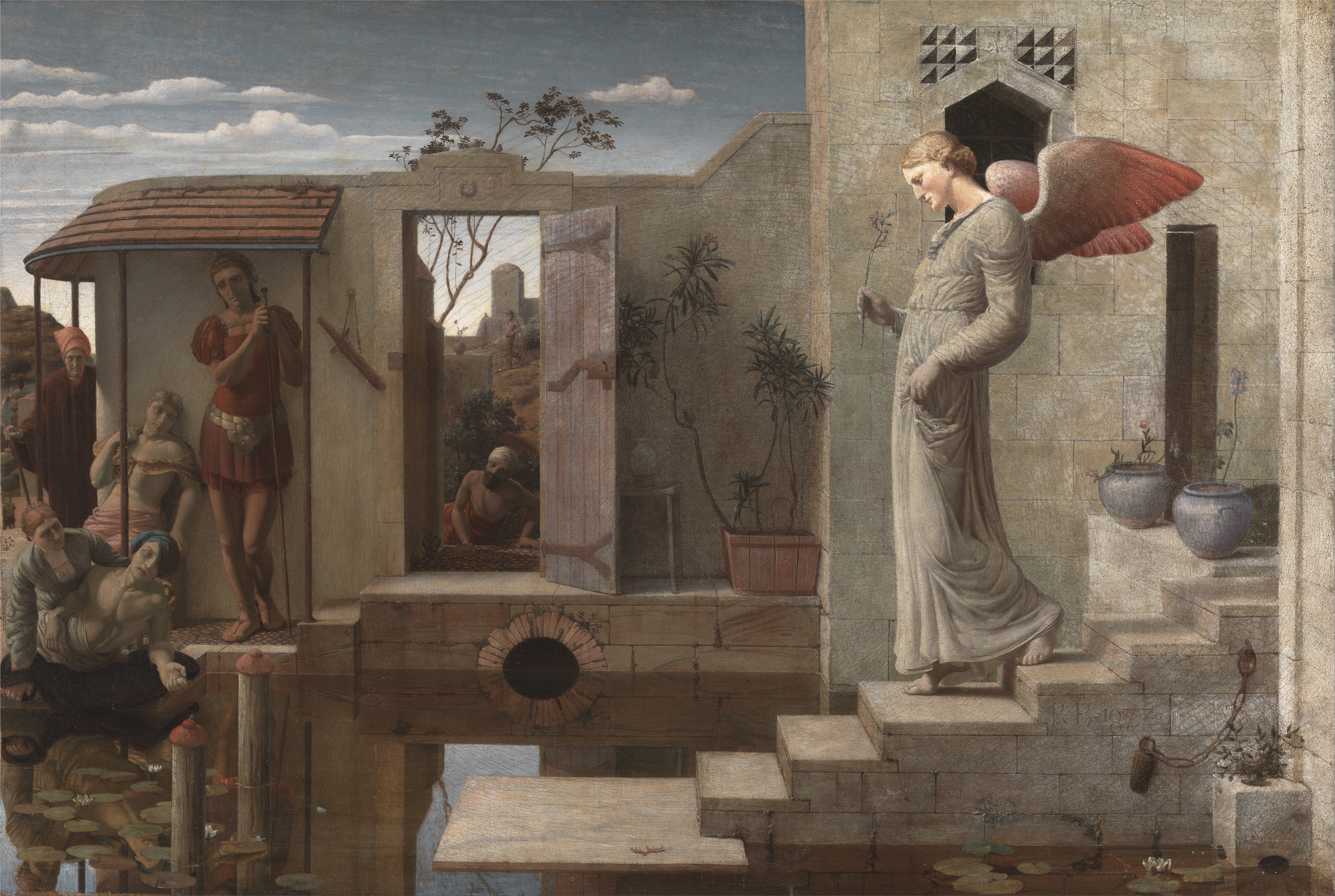
The Pool of Bethesda (1877)

Robert Bateman (1842–1922) was a British painter, architect and horticultural designer.

== Life ==
He was the third son of James Bateman FRS (1811–1897), the accomplished horticulturist and landowner, who built Biddulph Grange and its gardens, in Staffordshire, and Maria Sybilla Egerton-Warburton.

Along with his elder brothers John and Rowland, Robert was educated at Brighton College from 1855 to 1860. From 1863 to 1867, he was a student at the Royal Academy schools. From about 1870, he was the leader of a group of artists inspired by the art of Edward Burne-Jones. He was a founder of the Society of Painters in Tempera in 1901.

== Works ==
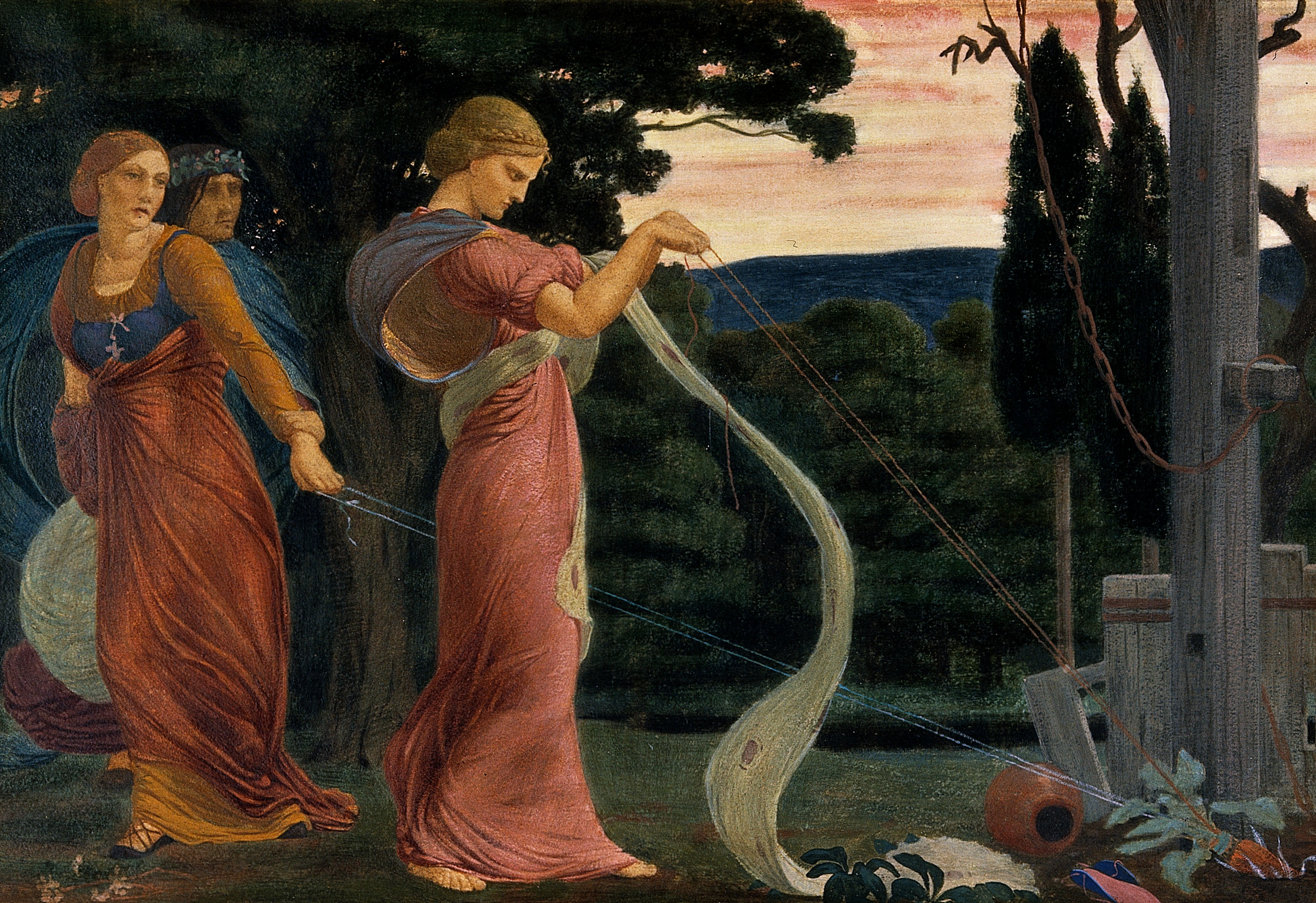
Three people plucking mandrake. Gouache by Robert Bateman

His key paintings are The Dead Knight (1870), also known as The Three Ravens, which was the title used when it was displayed in 1868, The Pool of Bethesda (1877, exhibited at the Royal Academy 1878), The Raising of Samuel (exhibited at the Royal Academy 1880) and The Lily or the Rose (exhibited at the Royal Academy 1882). Walter Crane, in his An Artist's Reminiscences (1907), described Bateman's painting as of... "a magic world of romance and pictured poetry, a twilight world of dark mysterious woodlands, haunted streams, meads of deep green starred with burning flowers, veiled in a dim and mystic light."

The Pool of Bethesda is at the Yale Centre of British Art. The Dead Knight is in a private collection, but there is a fine large colour reproduction in the book The Last Romantics (1989). He presented The Lily or the Rose to his old school, Brighton College, where it hung for many years on the main building staircase until it was destroyed around 1960 after Brighton Royal Pavilion Museum and Art Gallery refused to accept it as a gift.

In addition to paintings, Bateman designed religious woodcuts, his work appearing in The Latin Year, The Church Service and A Century of Bibles.

Robert practised as an architect, most notably building Collyers, a house near Petersfield. He was also noted as a naturalist (corresponding with Charles Darwin), a botanical illustrator, sculptor, book illustrator, and an Italian scholar. He also left a horticultural legacy, in his planting of the gardens at Benthall Hall from 1890–1906 — much of his garden design there is still extant and is now maintained by the National Trust as part of Benthall Hall.

== Family ==
Robert married the daughter of the Dean of Lichfield in 1883, and became a wealthy owner of property and land. His fortune led him to become a noted philanthropist of the time. He and his wife Caroline lived near Much Wenlock, Shropshire, at the 16th-century Benthall Hall; now a National Trust property.
