= James Bateman (horticulturist) =

British landowner and horticulturist

James Bateman's carte de visite, c. 1870

James Bateman (18 July 1811 – 27 November 1897) was a British horticulturist and author of books on orchids. He developed Biddulph Grange after moving there around 1840, from nearby Knypersley Hall in Staffordshire, England. He created the gardens at Biddulph with the aid of his wife Maria and his friend and painter of seascapes Edward William Cooke. From 1865 to 1870 he was the founding president of the North Staffordshire Field Club, an organisation which researched local natural history and folklore. He held strong creationist religious views, and built the Geological Gallery, Biddulph Grange to display his mapping of the six days of creation to the stratigraphical sequence of rocks and fossils. One of his books, Orchidaceae of Mexico and Guatemala, was one of the largest books ever printed.

== Biography ==
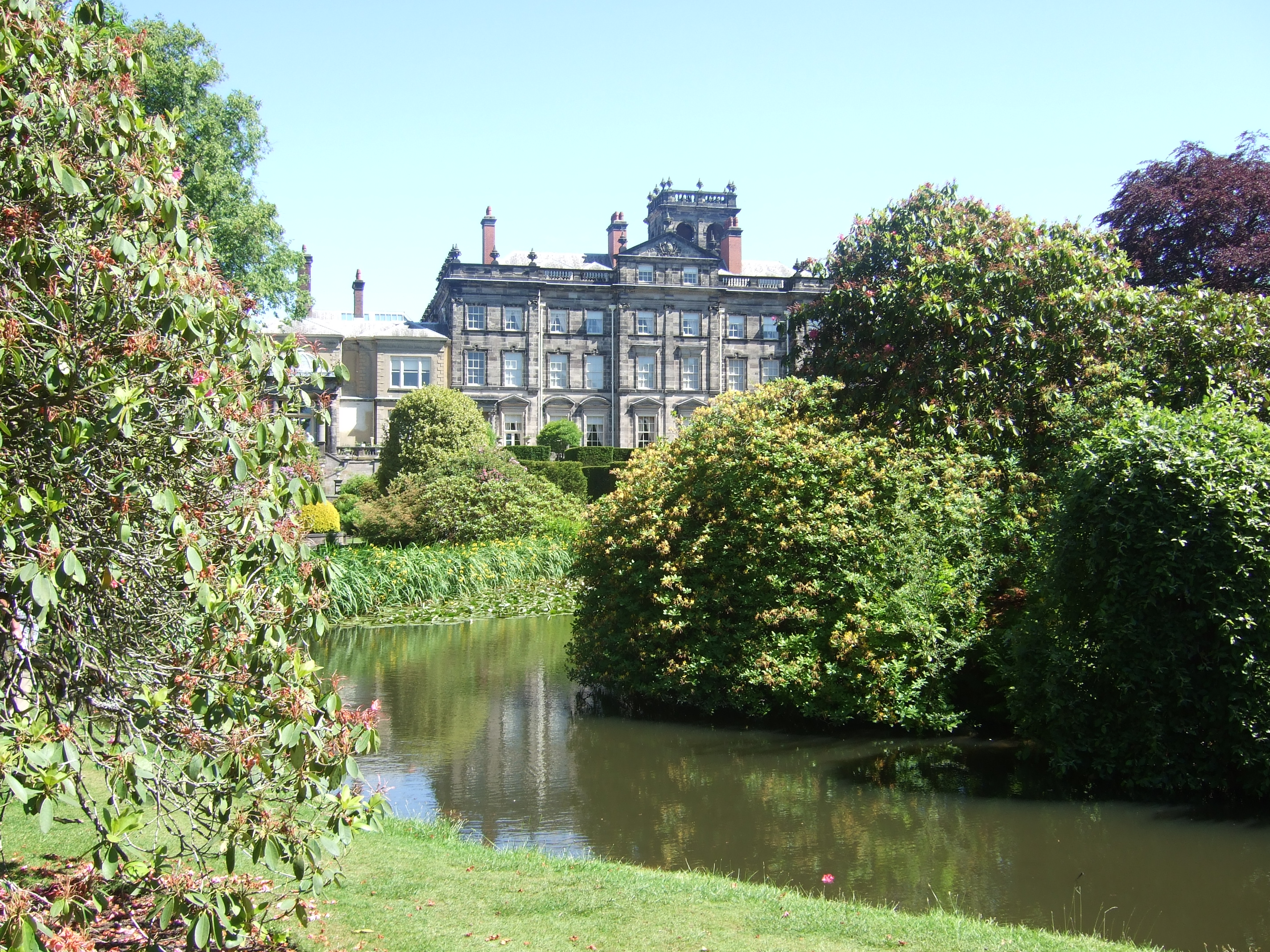
His home Biddulph Grange and gardens in Staffordshire

James Bateman was born at Redvales near Bury in Lancashire. He matriculated at Lincoln College, Oxford, in 1829, graduating from Magdalen College with a BA in 1834 and an MA in 1845. Over the next twenty years he made a great deal of money in iron, engineering and banking. He developed Biddulph Grange after moving there around 1840, from nearby Knypersley Hall in Staffordshire, England. In 1871, Bateman and his sons gave up the house and gardens at Biddulph, and he moved to Kensington in London. He later moved to Worthing in Sussex, where he died on 27 November 1897.

=== Plant collector and author ===
Bateman invested much effort in the task of creating a living collection of tropical plants. He became a Fellow of the Linnean Society in 1833, and a Fellow of the Royal Society in 1838. He was a Fellow of the Royal Horticultural Society. He wrote several books on orchids.

One of his books, Orchidaceae of Mexico and Guatemala, was too heavy for one person to carry, and measured 3 feet (0.91 m) wide by 4 feet (1.2 m) high. It had a subscription-only print run of 125 copies and was priced at 20 guineas. (Note: This would be worth over £3,000 in 2026.) In 1994, the botanical artist Wilfrid Blunt described it as "probably the finest, and certainly the largest, botanical book ever produced with lithographic plates", and praised the lithographer Maxim Gauci who made the 40 large illustrations. A copy sold for $75,000 at auction in 2013.

Orchidaceae of Mexico and Guatemala, 1837-43

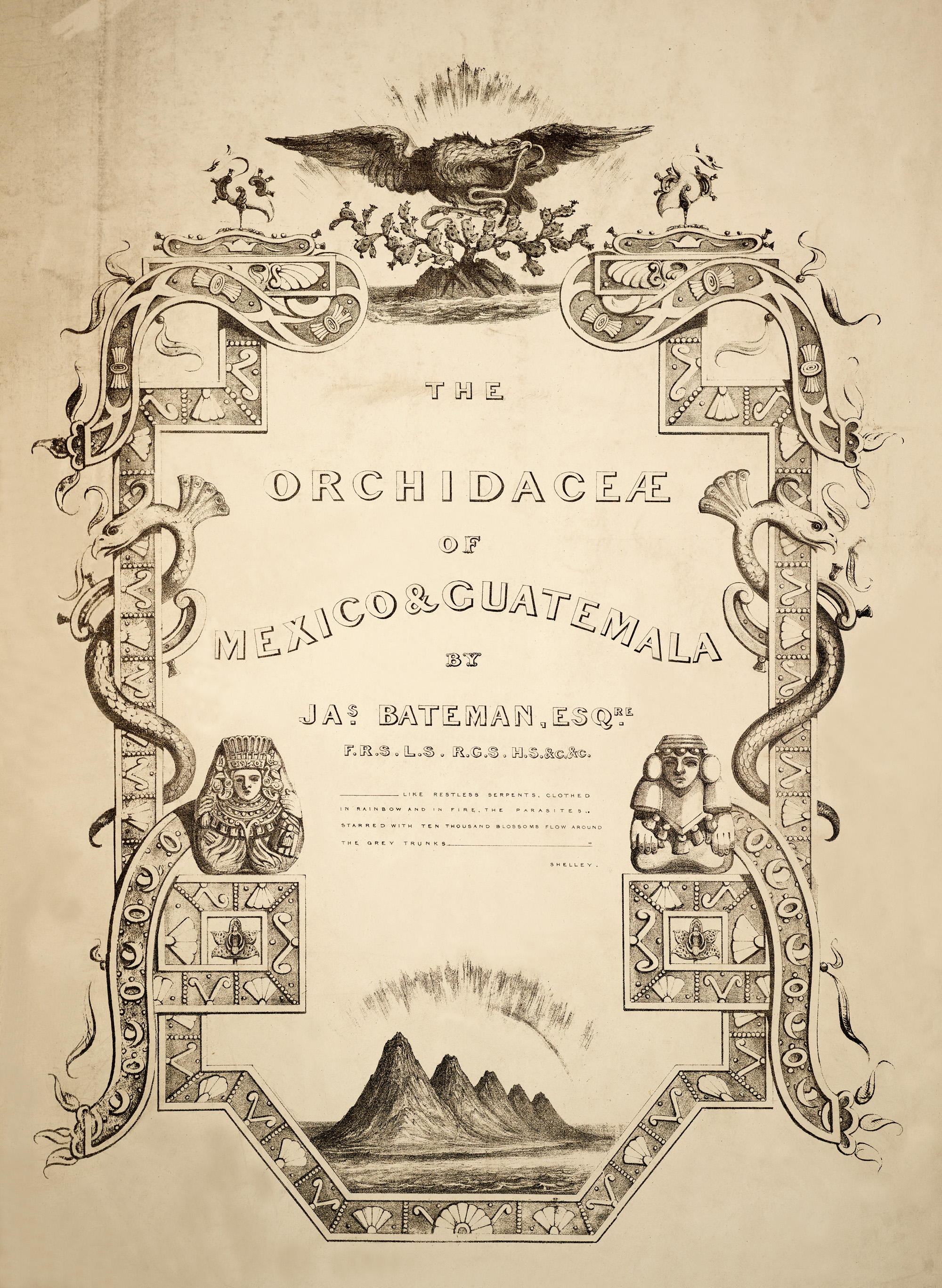
Title page

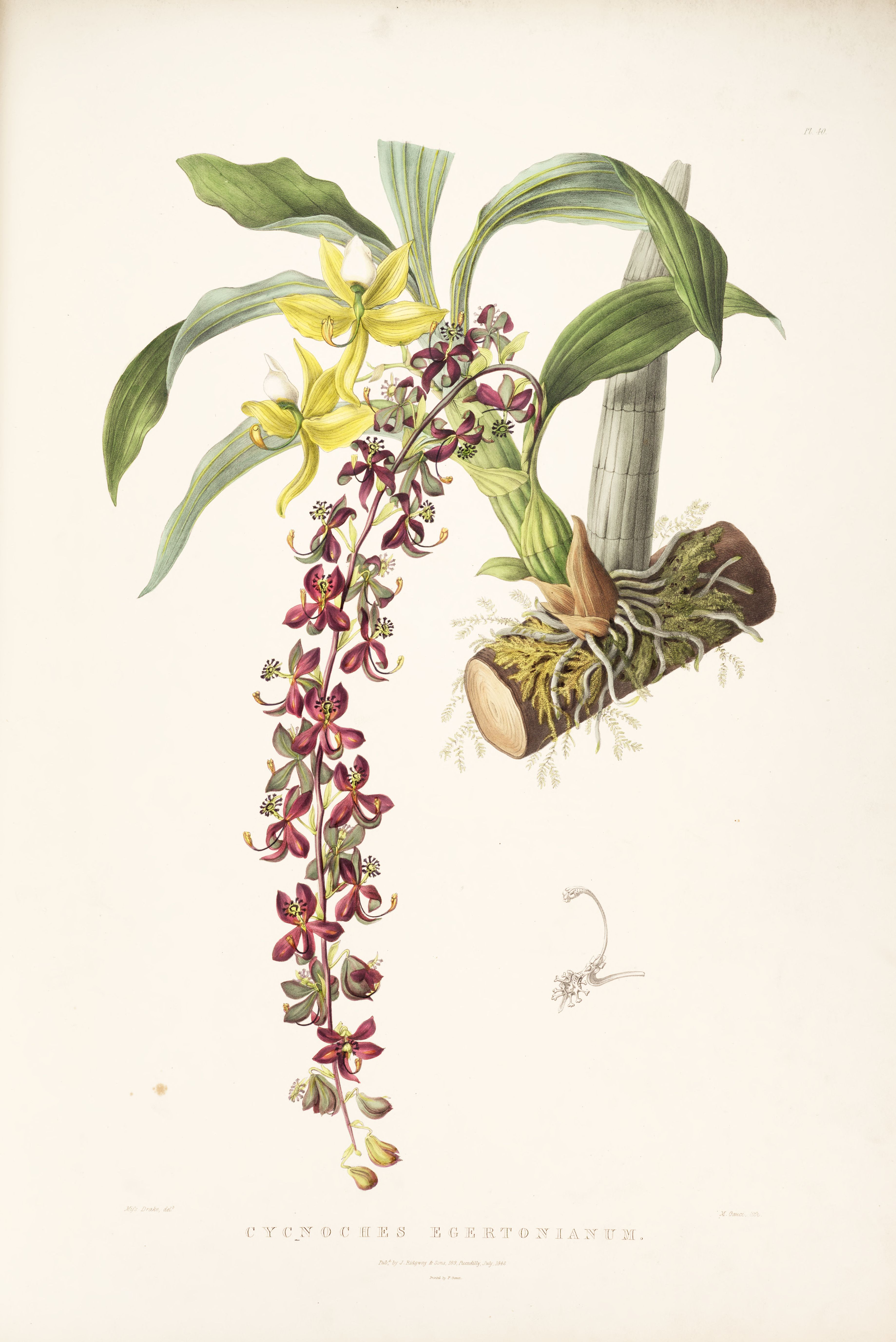
Drawing of Cycnoches egertonianum, an epiphytic orchid

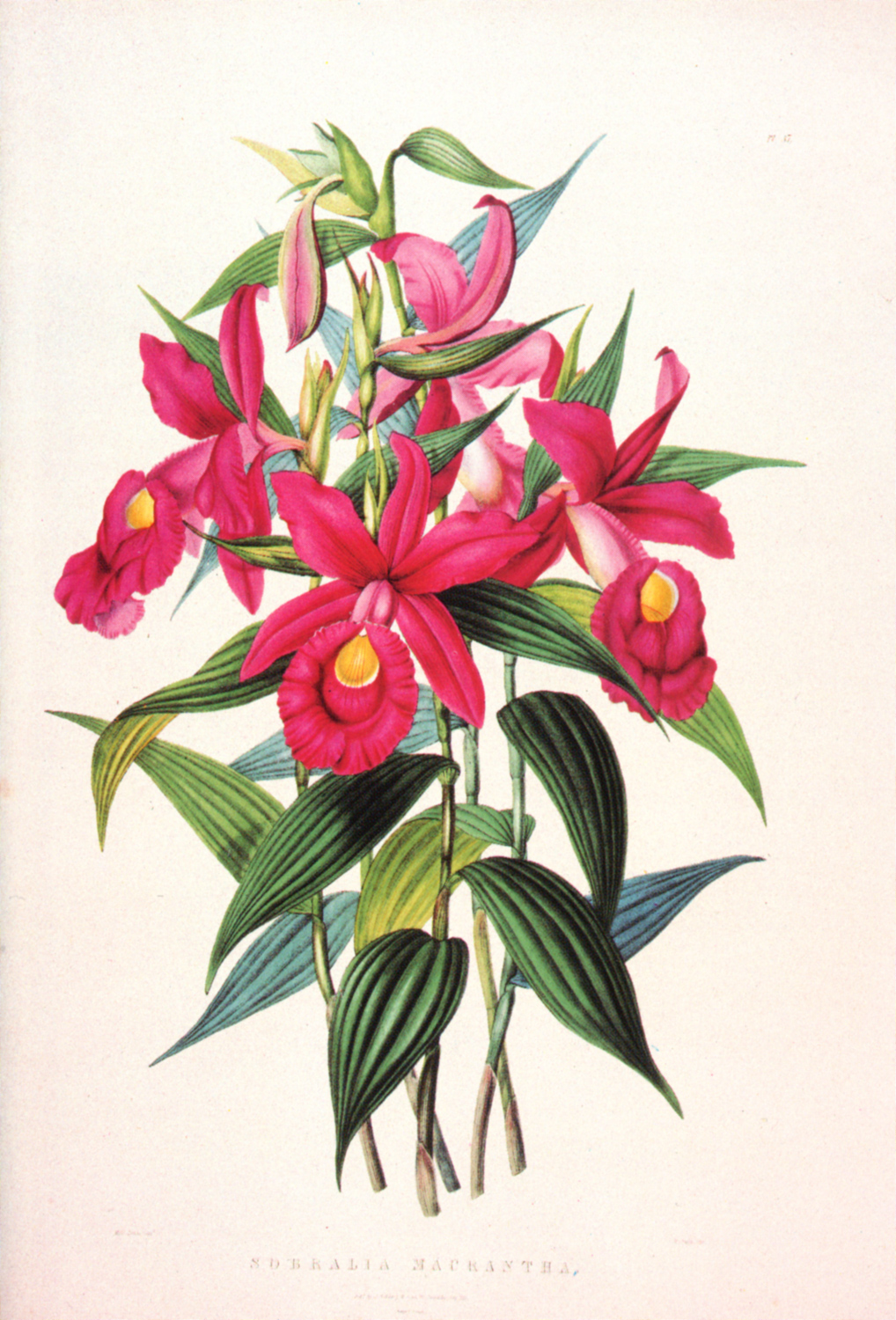
Sobralia macrantha

Epiphyte house at Knypersley Hall

Bateman became President of the North Staffordshire Field Society, and served on the Royal Horticultural Society's Plant Exploration Committee.

=== Garden designer ===
Bateman created the gardens at Biddulph with the aid of his botanist wife Maria and his friend and painter of seascapes Edward William Cooke. The gardens displayed Bateman's extensive collection of plants, sent to him by his plant collectors who travelled the world.

He designed several gardens around Britain, including the Derby Arboretum, described as "the first public park in England." In 1845 he planned the gardens around Warwick Castle.

=== Geology, evolution, and religion ===
The Geological Gallery, Biddulph Grange, from the door. The bays, with a stratigraphical sequence of rocks below and a selection of fossils from the same geological eras above, represent the six days of biblical creation.

Bateman expressed his strong creationist religious beliefs in the Geological Gallery at Biddulph Grange. Realising that a long sequence of rocks and fossils implied a great expanse of time before the supposed date of the creation of the world, he opened the gallery, a long straight corridor divided into six bays representing the six days of creation, with specimens from oldest to youngest in stratigraphical sequence, to set out his view that the rocks were created by God in six days.

He corresponded with the naturalist Charles Darwin, and on 25 January 1862 sent him a box of orchids. One of the orchids was Angraecum sesquipedale, which has a nectary some 30 centimetres (12 in) long. Darwin conjectured in a letter to the director of the Royal Botanic Gardens, Kew, Joseph Hooker, that this implied a pollinator with a tongue of that length, which must have co-evolved with the flower. The conjecture was shown to be correct with the 1907 discovery of the Madagascan form of a hawkmoth, Xanthopan morganii, and the 1992 observation of the moth's feeding from the flower.

Bateman however resisted Darwin's theory of evolution by natural selection. He was roundly criticised for this in the 1879 book Darwinism and Other Essays by his contemporary, the American philosopher John Fiske. Fiske wrote that Bateman's opposition was based on the "fallacy of supposing that the Darwinian theory can be overthrown simply by insisting upon the obvious fact that the intelligence and acquirements of man are enormously—almost incommensurably—greater than the intelligence and acquirements of the highest apes."

=== Family ===
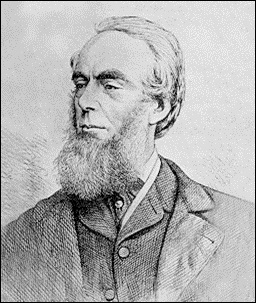
James Bateman

On 24 April 1838, he married Maria Sybilla, third daughter of Rowland Egerton Warburton and sister of Peter Egerton Warburton; they had three sons, John, Rowland, and Robert (a notable painter), and a daughter, Katherine.

== Publications ==
- The Orchidaceae of Mexico and Guatemala by James Bateman, printed for the author by J. Ridgway & Sons, 1837–1843. (dimensions: 3' × 4'.)
- A Second Century of Orchidaceous Plants, by James Bateman, London: L. Reeve & Co., 1867. "Large-4to (315 x 245 mm). pp. viii, with 100 beautifully handcoloured lithographed plates and descriptive text."
- A monograph of Odontoglossum by James Bateman, London: L. Reeve & Co., 1874. Facsimile of the title page

== See also ==
- Edward William Cooke
- Biddulph Grange
