= Biddulph Grange =

Landscaped garden in Biddulph, Staffordshire, England

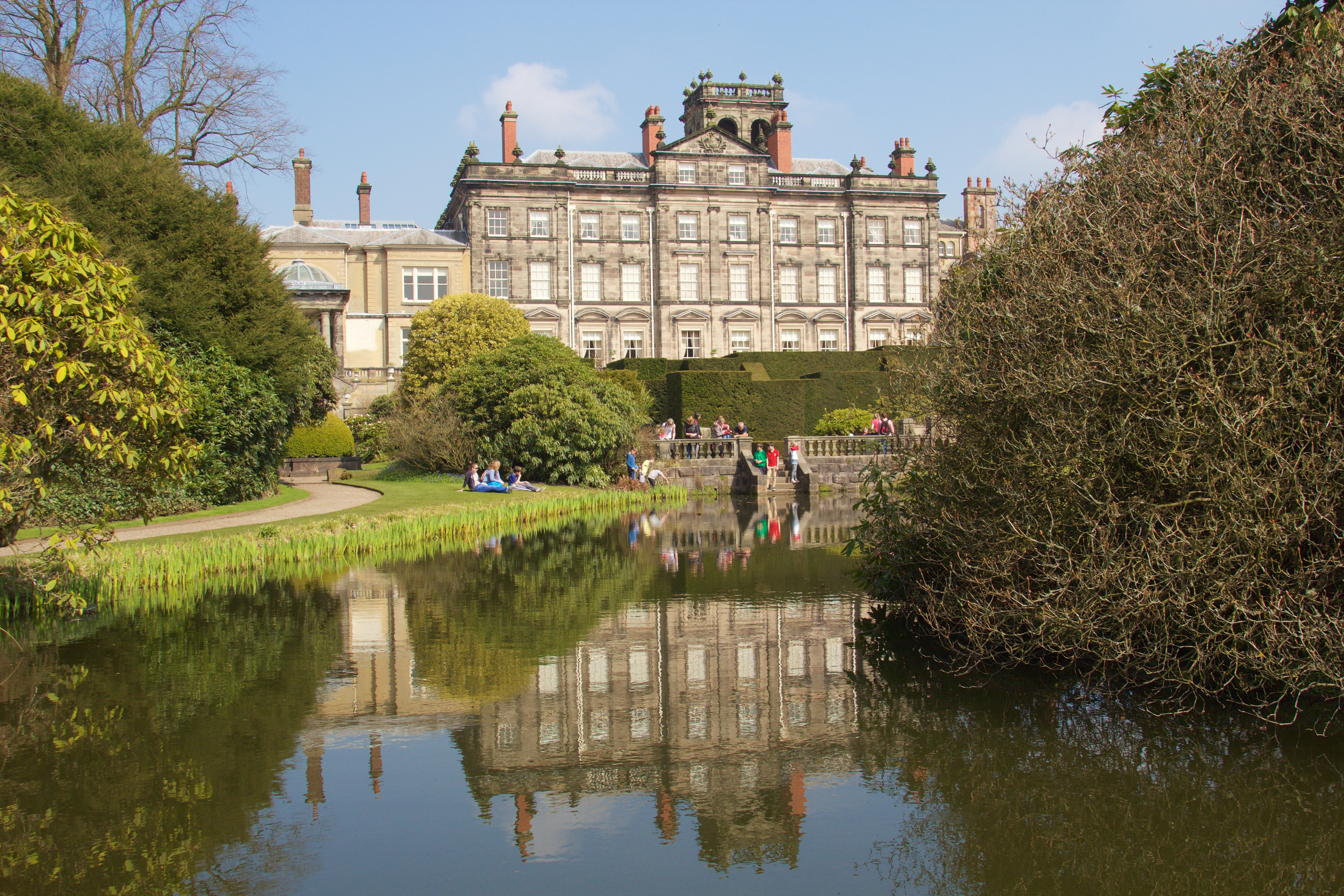
- Interactive map of Biddulph Grange
- Type: Landscaped Victorian garden
- Location: Grange Road, Biddulph, Staffordshire, England
- Coordinates: 53°7′47″N 2°9′44″W
- Area: 15 acres (6.1 ha)
- Founder: James Bateman
- Operator: National Trust
- Website: Official website

Biddulph Grange is a country house and a National Trust landscaped garden, in Biddulph near Stoke-on-Trent, Staffordshire, England. It was created by the English horticulturist James Bateman. The house includes the Geological Gallery which expresses Bateman's religious view of geology. The garden consists of an intricate arrangement of features with a lake, lawns, tunnels, hedges, and buildings depicting landscapes including 'China' and 'Egypt'.

Other land formerly owned by Bateman is now the nearby Biddulph Grange Country Park.

== History ==
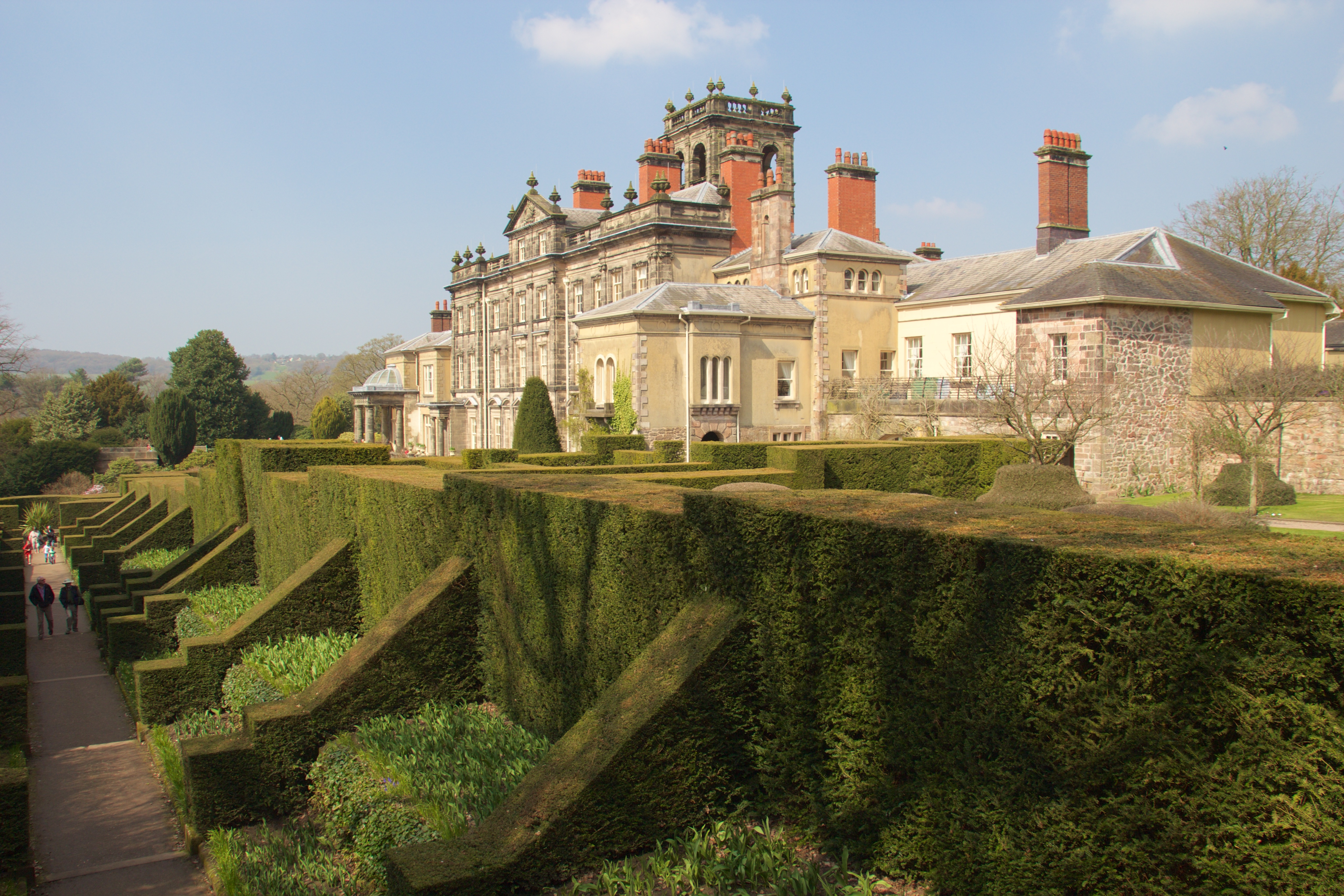
View along the restored Dahlia Walk

Biddulph Grange was developed by James Bateman (1811–1897), a wealthy horticulturist and landowner. He moved from nearby Knypersley Hall to Biddulph Grange in 1842, when he married. He created the gardens with the aid of his friend and marine painter Edward William Cooke. The gardens displayed Bateman's extensive collection of plants, sent to him by his plant collectors who travelled the world.

The garden was visited and mapped in 1862 by the landscape architect Edward Kemp.

Edward Kemp's 1862 map of Biddulph Grange in The Gardeners' Chronicle. At top: Wellingtonia Avenue; top centre: Arboretum; centre upper right: Pinetum; centre: 'China', Bowling Green; bottom: Terrace, Rhododendron Ground; centre: house, Dahlia Walk and (Italianate) Parterres (not labelled)

In 1868 Bateman moved to Kensington in London, selling Biddulph Grange to Robert Heath in 1872. The middle section of the house was later badly damaged by fire, and was rebuilt in 1897. In 1922 the house was sold to the North Staffordshire Cripples Aid Society. By 1925 the house was run by Lancashire County Council as an orthopedic hospital for children. During the 1930s, the greenhouses and outbuildings, and the end of the Geological Gallery, were demolished to make way for hospital wards.

The uncultivated 78 acres (32 ha) of Bateman's former estate became the Biddulph Grange Country Park. The garden was purchased by the National Trust in 1991, who proceeded to restore it.

== Description ==
Biddulph Grange is a private country house and an elaborately landscaped garden managed by the National Trust. It contains an exceptional range of garden elements including tunnels, rockeries, Italianate parterre terraces, a 'Scottish glen', China and Ancient Egypt gardens with statues and temples.

Bateman and Cooke chose to conceal the garden's many themed areas using thick bushes, long hedges, and piles of rocks. The effect is to create a tight jigsaw puzzle of interlocking elements. The 'Egypt' garden is themed with a pair of sphinxes in front of a dark tunnel that resembles a mastaba. Inside, lit in red, is a chamber containing a strange squatting statue of the Ape of Thoth.

=== Garden features ===
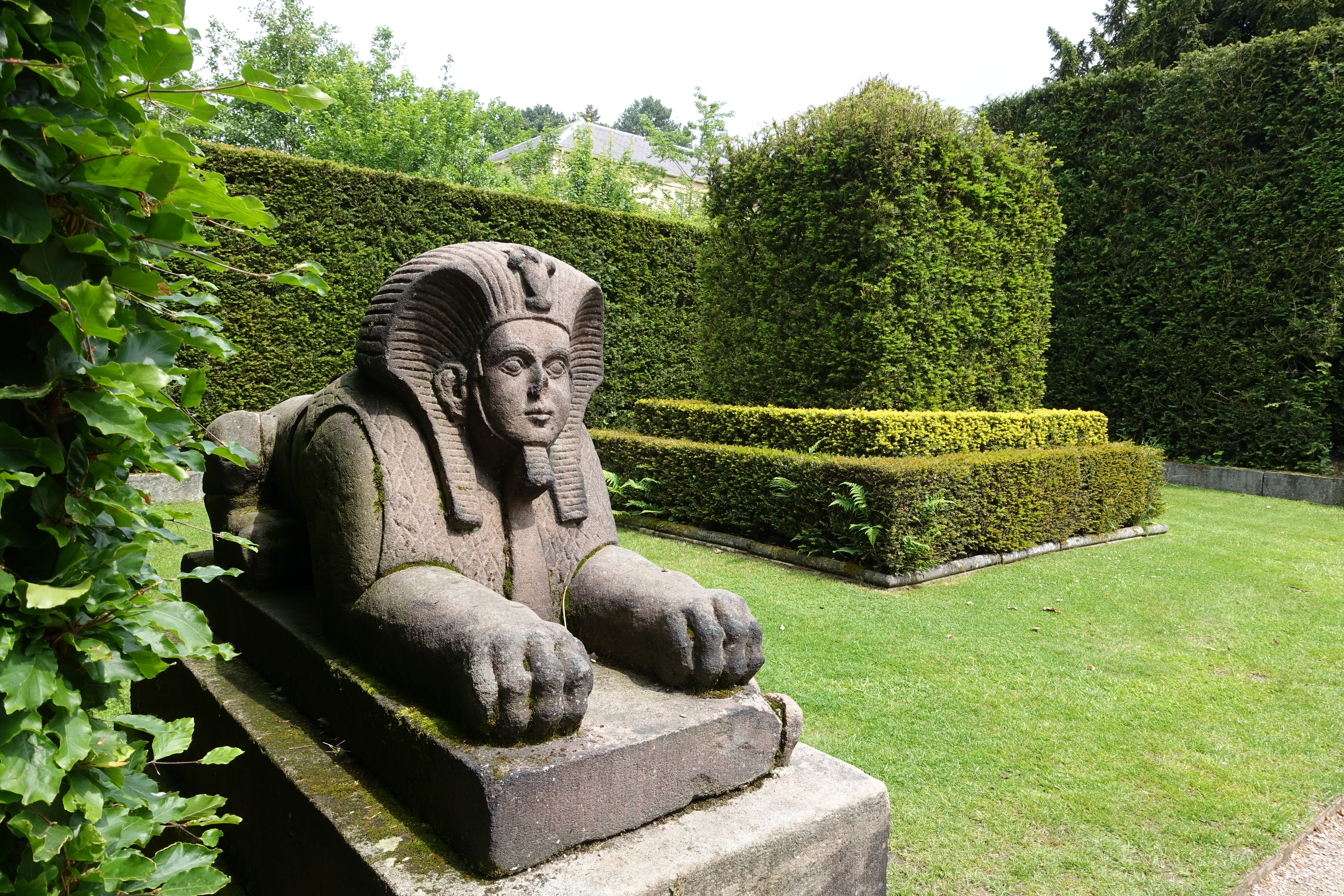
Sphinx in 'Egypt' garden

The garden is divided into many themed areas, including:

- Chinese garden, with a 'Great Wall of China', a red bridge and pagoda, and a gilded statue of a water buffalo
- 'Italy', with formal parterre terraces
- Egypt Court with topiary pyramid and obelisks
- The Pinetum, with Araucarias, cedars, cypresses, firs, pines, redwoods, and spruces, and some broadleaved trees
- Cheshire Cottage, a half-timbered house built in 1856, with the initials of James and Maria Bateman in the plasterwork
- Dahlia Walk, with large clipped yew hedges arranged as a wall with many buttresses, interspersed with large numbers of dahlias and tulips
- Wellingtonia Avenue of Sequoiadendron giganteum trees, replanted in the 1990s
- The Stumpery, created in 1856, the first of its kind in the world
Topiary pyramid in 'Egypt', over mastaba-like building

One of the formal parterres

Entrance to one of the tunnels
Chinese pagoda

Autumn lake scene in 'China' garden

Gilded water buffalo statue

=== Geological Gallery ===
The Geological Gallery, Biddulph Grange, from the door (and Day 6) to the far end

The house includes the Geological Gallery, open to the public, which expresses Bateman's religious view of geology. It consists of a long stone-built corridor with six bays representing the six days of creation. The bays contain rocks and fossils arranged in sequence.

== See also ==
- Listed buildings in Biddulph
- European Garden Heritage Network
