= Grade II* listed buildings in Staffordshire Moorlands =

There are over 20,000 Grade II* listed buildings in England. This page is a list of these buildings in the district of Staffordshire Moorlands in Staffordshire.

== Staffordshire Moorlands ==
Name	Location	Type	Completed (Note: The date given is the date used by Historic England as significant for the initial building or that of an important part in the structure's description.)	Date designated	Grid ref. (Note: The grid reference is based on the British national grid reference system, sometimes known as OSGB36, used by the Ordnance Survey.) Geo-coordinates	Entry number (Note: The "List Entry Number" is a unique number assigned to each listed building and scheduled monument by Historic England.)	Image
Base of Cross Shaft about 5m north of North Aisle of Church of St Peter	Alstonefield, Staffordshire Moorlands	Cross	10th century	15 March 1985	SK1328955359; 53°05′43″N 1°48′11″W	1374579	Base of Cross Shaft about 5m north of North Aisle of Church of St Peter More images
Charles Cotton's Fishing House	Alstonefield, Staffordshire Moorlands	Fish House	1674	1 February 1967	SK1274059224; 53°07′48″N 1°48′40″W	1188084	Charles Cotton's Fishing House More images
Hall Farmhouse	Alstonefield, Staffordshire Moorlands	Farmhouse	1587	1 February 1967	SK1323655473; 53°05′47″N 1°48′14″W	1374580	Upload Photo
Catholic Church of St John the Baptist	Alton, Staffordshire Moorlands	Roman Catholic Church	c. 1840	3 January 1967	SK0736142466; 52°58′46″N 1°53′31″W	1374686	Upload Photo
Church of St Leonard	Bradley in the Moors, Alton, Staffordshire Moorlands	Chapel of Ease	1750	3 January 1967	SK0590241336; 52°58′10″N 1°54′49″W	1037911	Church of St Leonard More images
Church of St Peter	Alton, Staffordshire Moorlands	Parish Church	12th century	3 January 1967	SK0736142342; 52°58′42″N 1°53′31″W	1191066	Church of St Peter More images
Hospital of St John	Alton, Staffordshire Moorlands	School	1986	3 January 1967	SK0739842450; 52°58′46″N 1°53′29″W	1037914	Upload Photo
St Johns Preparatory School	Alton, Staffordshire Moorlands	House	1847	3 January 1967	SK0731642478; 52°58′47″N 1°53′33″W	1037917	Upload Photo
The Malt House	Alton, Staffordshire Moorlands	House	Late 17th century	3 January 1967	SK0710742141; 52°58′36″N 1°53′44″W	1037891	Upload Photo
Biddulph Grange	Biddulph Grange Country Park, Biddulph, Staffordshire Moorlands	Farmhouse	1848-60	20 March 1974	SJ8923459207; 53°07′48″N 2°09′44″W	1037835	Biddulph Grange More images
Biddulph Old Hall	Biddulph, Staffordshire Moorlands	Farmhouse	Late 17th century	13 April 1951	SJ8936760197; 53°08′20″N 2°09′37″W	1374760	Biddulph Old Hall More images
Church of St Lawrence and Coffin Lids and Benches on South Side	Biddulph, Staffordshire Moorlands	Bench	15th century	13 April 1951	SJ8899659015; 53°07′41″N 2°09′57″W	1189902	Church of St Lawrence and Coffin Lids and Benches on South Side More images
Egyptian Portal and Two Pairs of Sphinxes	Biddulph Grange, Biddulph, Staffordshire Moorlands	Garden Building	c. 1856	20 March 1974	SJ8932359155; 53°07′46″N 2°09′40″W	1037838	Egyptian Portal and Two Pairs of Sphinxes More images
Knypersley Hall	Knypersley, Biddulph, Staffordshire Moorlands	House	Pre 18th century	22 August 1994	SJ8844456391; 53°06′17″N 2°10′27″W	1074943	Upload Photo
Prospect Tower and attached Wing	Knypersley, Biddulph, Staffordshire Moorlands	Wall	1828	20 November 1987	SJ8967755341; 53°05′43″N 2°09′20″W	1037810	Prospect Tower and attached Wing More images
Church of St Peter	Caverswall, Staffordshire Moorlands	Church	19th century	3 January 1967	SJ9516842788; 52°58′57″N 2°04′24″W	1374655	Church of St Peter More images
Hales Hall	Cheadle, Staffordshire Moorlands	Country House	1712	2 May 1953	SK0214244041; 52°59′37″N 1°58′10″W	1204735	Upload Photo
Mill House	Cheadle, Staffordshire Moorlands	Farmhouse	1635	2 May 1953	SK0153442375; 52°58′43″N 1°58′43″W	1037949	Upload Photo
Heath House	Checkley, Staffordshire Moorlands	Country House	c. 1836	3 January 1967	SK0264639255; 52°57′02″N 1°57′43″W	1374695	Upload Photo
New Tean Hall Mill	Checkley, Staffordshire Moorlands	Tower	1860	3 January 1967	SK0098939552; 52°57′12″N 1°59′12″W	1037964	New Tean Hall Mill More images
Orangery, Screen Wall and Potting Sheds Approximately 200 Metres North East of Heath House	Checkley, Staffordshire Moorlands	Serpentine Wall	c. 1830	8 August 1986	SK0275539296; 52°57′04″N 1°57′38″W	1037930	Upload Photo
Tean Hall	Checkley, Staffordshire Moorlands	House	17th century	3 January 1967	SK0101439544; 52°57′12″N 1°59′11″W	1280982	Tean Hall More images
Church of St Edward the Confessor	Cheddleton, Staffordshire Moorlands	Parish Church	13th century	3 January 1967	SJ9709252411; 53°04′08″N 2°02′41″W	1188783	Church of St Edward the Confessor More images
Finneylane Farmhouse	Cheddleton, Staffordshire Moorlands	Farmhouse	1610	15 December 1986	SJ9960953562; 53°04′45″N 2°00′26″W	1038109	Upload Photo
Furnaces about 30m south of Cheddleton Mill	Cheddleton, Staffordshire Moorlands	Furnaces	Late 18th century	15 December 1986	SJ9719752619; 53°04′15″N 2°02′36″W	1188754	Furnaces about 30m south of Cheddleton Mill
Mill Cottage adjacent to Cheddleton Mill (south)	Cheddleton, Staffordshire Moorlands	Mill House	Early 19th century	15 December 1986	SJ9721952606; 53°04′14″N 2°02′35″W	1038106	Upload Photo
Mill Cottage about 20m south-east of Cheddleton Flint Mill	Cheddleton, Staffordshire Moorlands	Mill House	Late 18th century	15 December 1986	SJ9720852591; 53°04′14″N 2°02′35″W	1294611	Upload Photo
Mosslee Hall	Cheddleton, Staffordshire Moorlands	Farmhouse	Remodelled C15/C16	2 May 1953	SJ9999650658; 53°03′11″N 2°00′05″W	1188604	Upload Photo
North Mill to Cheddleton Flint Mill	Cheddleton, Staffordshire Moorlands	Watermill	1756-65	15 December 1986	SJ9722952636; 53°04′15″N 2°02′34″W	1038107	North Mill to Cheddleton Flint Mill More images
Slip Drying Kiln and Sheds to Cheddleton Flint Mill	Cheddleton, Staffordshire Moorlands	Drying Kiln	Early 19th century	15 December 1986	SJ9720952620; 53°04′15″N 2°02′35″W	1188760	Slip Drying Kiln and Sheds to Cheddleton Flint Mill
South Mill to Cheddleton Flint Mill	Cheddleton, Staffordshire Moorlands	Flint Mill	Early to mid 19th century	15 December 1986	SJ9721852618; 53°04′15″N 2°02′35″W	1374593	South Mill to Cheddleton Flint Mill More images
Church of All Saints	Dilhorne, Staffordshire Moorlands	Parish Church	Late 13th century	3 January 1967	SJ9705943362; 52°59′15″N 2°02′43″W	1374702	Church of All Saints More images
Church of St Margaret	Draycott in the Moors, Staffordshire Moorlands	Parish Church	Late 13th century	3 January 1967	SJ9810340231; 52°57′34″N 2°01′47″W	1037947	Church of St Margaret More images
The Ashes	Endon and Stanley, Staffordshire Moorlands	Farmhouse	17th century	22 October 1952	SJ9316454486; 53°05′15″N 2°06′13″W	1038054	Upload Photo
Alton Towers and attached Garden Walls and Gatehouse	Alton Towers, Farley, Staffordshire Moorlands	Country House	c1810 - c1840	6 July 1951	SK0724943235; 52°59′11″N 1°53′36″W	1374685	Alton Towers and attached Garden Walls and Gatehouse More images
Memorial to the 15th Earl of Shrewsbury	Alton Towers, Farley, Staffordshire Moorlands	Commemorative Monument	c. 1830	3 January 1967	SK0740843297; 52°59′13″N 1°53′28″W	1374741	Memorial to the 15th Earl of Shrewsbury More images
The Conservatory and attached Wall, Steps and Urns	Alton Towers, Farley, Staffordshire Moorlands	Wall	c. 1824	3 January 1967	SK0751943356; 52°59′15″N 1°53′22″W	1191969	The Conservatory and attached Wall, Steps and Urns More images
The Pagoda Fountain and Bridge Pier	Alton Towers, Farley, Staffordshire Moorlands	Fountain	c. 1832	3 January 1967	SK0767043228; 52°59′11″N 1°53′14″W	1192054	The Pagoda Fountain and Bridge Pier More images
The Prospect Tower and Wall and Railings to the South	Alton Towers, Farley, Staffordshire Moorlands	Tower	c. 1824	3 January 1967	SK0774343326; 52°59′14″N 1°53′10″W	1192015	The Prospect Tower and Wall and Railings to the South More images
Church of St John (and attached School House)	Reaps Moor, Fawfieldhead, Staffordshire Moorlands	Gate	1842	5 June 1985	SK0838062115; 53°09′22″N 1°52′34″W	1190390	Church of St John (and attached School House) More images
Church of St Agnes	Hollinsclough, Staffordshire Moorlands	School	1840	1 February 1967	SK0657366555; 53°11′46″N 1°54′11″W	1252469	Church of St Agnes More images
Church of St Michael	Horton, Staffordshire Moorlands	Parish Church	15th century	1 February 1967	SJ9421557377; 53°06′49″N 2°05′16″W	1190357	Church of St Michael More images
Dairy House Farmhouse	Horton, Staffordshire Moorlands	Farmhouse	1635	22 October 1952	SJ9371758361; 53°07′21″N 2°05′43″W	1037790	Dairy House Farmhouse More images
Horton Hall	Horton, Staffordshire Moorlands	House	Mid 17th century	22 October 1952	SJ9408957441; 53°06′51″N 2°05′23″W	1374778	Horton Hall More images
Rudyard Hall	Horton, Staffordshire Moorlands	Manor House	Mid 17th century	1 February 1967	SJ9642559670; 53°08′03″N 2°03′18″W	1374756	Upload Photo
Castern Hall	Ilam, Staffordshire Moorlands	House	c. 1740	1 February 1967	SK1233152394; 53°04′07″N 1°49′03″W	1188780	Castern Hall More images
Gate Piers, Forecourt Walls and Steps to Castern Hall	Ilam, Staffordshire Moorlands	Gate	C20	1 February 1967	SK1231752373; 53°04′06″N 1°49′03″W	1188790	Upload Photo
Grave Cover about 20m south of West Tower of Church of Holy Cross	Ilam Park, Ilam, Staffordshire Moorlands	Grave Slab	13th century	15 March 1985	SK1326050661; 53°03′11″N 1°48′13″W	1188679	Grave Cover about 20m south of West Tower of Church of Holy Cross
Ilam Hall and Gardeners Cottage *	Ilam Park, Ilam, Staffordshire Moorlands	Country House	1821-1826	1 February 1967	SK1313750660; 53°03′11″N 1°48′20″W	1188713	Ilam Hall and Gardeners Cottage * More images
Mrs Watts-Russell Memorial	Ilam, Staffordshire Moorlands	Commemorative Monument	1840	1 February 1967	SK1353350845; 53°03′17″N 1°47′58″W	1038152	Mrs Watts-Russell Memorial More images
Church of St Leonard	Stocks Green, Ipstones, Staffordshire Moorlands	Parish Church	1789-92	3 January 1967	SK0178450219; 53°02′57″N 1°58′29″W	1038044	Church of St Leonard More images
Gazebo about 20m west of Whitehough	Ipstones, Staffordshire Moorlands	Gazebo	Early 18th century	2 May 1953	SK0132651279; 53°03′32″N 1°58′54″W	1374612	Gazebo about 20m west of Whitehough
Sharpecliffe Hall	Ipstones, Staffordshire Moorlands	House	Earlier than 1673	2 May 1953	SK0085952172; 53°04′00″N 1°59′19″W	1374611	Sharpecliffe Hall More images
Whitehough	Ipstones, Staffordshire Moorlands	Farmhouse	17th century	2 May 1953	SK0133751293; 53°03′32″N 1°58′53″W	1189010	Whitehough More images
Abbey Inn	Leek, Staffordshire Moorlands	House	1702	13 April 1951	SJ9794057787; 53°07′02″N 2°01′56″W	1268652	Abbey Inn More images
Church of St Luke	Leek, Staffordshire Moorlands	Parish Church	1848	7 June 1972	SJ9881956558; 53°06′22″N 2°01′09″W	1268593	Church of St Luke More images
Greystones	Leek, Staffordshire Moorlands	House	Late 17th century	13 April 1951	SJ9851456651; 53°06′25″N 2°01′25″W	1268542	Greystones More images
Nicholson Institute and Leek College of Further Education	Leek, Staffordshire Moorlands	Steps	1882-1884	7 June 1972	SJ9851256678; 53°06′26″N 2°01′25″W	1268544	Nicholson Institute and Leek College of Further Education More images
Parish Church of St Edward the Confessor	Leek, Staffordshire Moorlands	Church	1815	13 April 1951	SJ9832556630; 53°06′25″N 2°01′35″W	1268646	Parish Church of St Edward the Confessor More images
Church of St Matthew	Meerbrook, Leekfrith, Staffordshire Moorlands	Parish Church	1868	20 November 1987	SJ9890760834; 53°08′41″N 2°01′04″W	1374745	Church of St Matthew More images
Windygates Hall	Leekfrith, Staffordshire Moorlands	Farmhouse	1634	20 November 1987	SK0042061807; 53°09′12″N 1°59′43″W	1037800	Windygates Hall More images
Church of St Bartholomew	Longnor, Staffordshire Moorlands	Parish Church	c. 1781	1 February 1967	SK0887964984; 53°10′55″N 1°52′07″W	1038202	Church of St Bartholomew More images
Church of St Chad	Longsdon, Staffordshire Moorlands	Parish Church	1903-1905	1 February 1967	SJ9590554614; 53°05′19″N 2°03′45″W	1037805	Church of St Chad More images
Harracles Hall	Longsdon, Staffordshire Moorlands	Country House	Early 18th century	1 February 1967	SJ9557457297; 53°06′46″N 2°04′03″W	1191166	Upload Photo
Church of St Lawrence	Rushton Bank, Rushton, Staffordshire Moorlands	Church	15th century and Earlier	1 February 1967	SJ9343462073; 53°09′21″N 2°05′59″W	1191388	Church of St Lawrence More images
Broadmeadow Hall	Sheen, Staffordshire Moorlands	Farmhouse	Mid 17th century	2 August 1974	SK1135063349; 53°10′02″N 1°49′54″W	1374566	Broadmeadow Hall More images
Church of St Luke with Gargoyles to West and Effigy to East	Sheen, Staffordshire Moorlands	Steps	1850-1852	1 February 1967	SK1132761500; 53°09′02″N 1°49′56″W	1038180	Church of St Luke with Gargoyles to West and Effigy to East More images
Critchlow Memorial and Railings 3m south of Chancel of Church of St Luke	Sheen, Staffordshire Moorlands	Chest Tomb	c. 1853	5 June 1985	SK1134261486; 53°09′01″N 1°49′55″W	1374551	Upload Photo
The Old Rectory	Sheen, Staffordshire Moorlands	Vicarage	c. 1852	5 June 1985	SK1133361426; 53°08′59″N 1°49′55″W	1038184	Upload Photo
Church of St John Baptist	Upper Elkstone, Warslow and Elkstones, Staffordshire Moorlands	Church	1786	1 February 1967	SK0564058973; 53°07′40″N 1°55′02″W	1226791	Church of St John Baptist More images
Church of St James and St Bartholomew	Waterhouses, Staffordshire Moorlands	Parish Church	c. 1200	3 January 1967	SK0819251649; 53°03′43″N 1°52′45″W	1192380	Church of St James and St Bartholomew More images
Leehouse Farmhouse and attached Garden Wall and Troughs	Waterhouses, Waterhouses, Staffordshire Moorlands	Farmhouse	1751	2 May 1953	SK0826450282; 53°02′59″N 1°52′41″W	1192627	Upload Photo
Throwley Old Hall Remains	Throwley, Waterhouses, Staffordshire Moorlands	House	Early 16th century	2 May 1953	SK1098352558; 53°04′13″N 1°50′15″W	1374740	Throwley Old Hall Remains More images
Church of St Margaret	Wetton, Staffordshire Moorlands	Parish Church	14th century	1 February 1967	SK1087155394; 53°05′44″N 1°50′21″W	1227179	Church of St Margaret More images
