= Castern Hall =

18th-century country house in Staffordshire, England

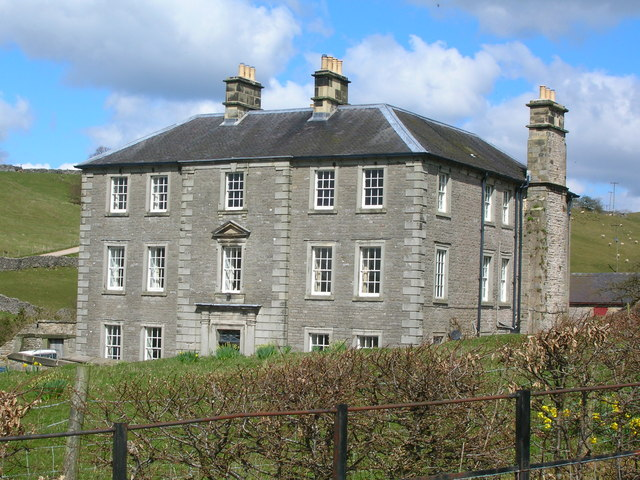
Castern(e) Hall

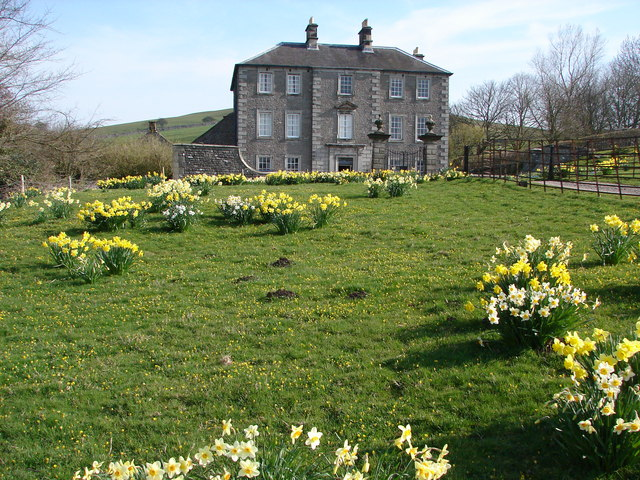
Daffodils at Castern(e) Hall in 2007

Castern Hall, also known as Casterne Hall, is a privately owned 18th-century country house in the Manifold Valley, near Ilam, Staffordshire, England.

== History ==
Excavations at Castern show that that the site has been occupied since the 12th century , The grange at Castern was owned by Burton Abbey until the Dissolution of the Monasteries. It was acquired by Roger Hurt, youngest son of Nicholas Hurt of Ashbourne, who settled there in the mid-16th century. Later, Nicholas Hurt (1649-1711) married the heiress of Alderwasley and in time Alderwasley Hall became the family's principal residence.

The Castern house was remodeled in about 1740 by Nicholas Hurt, who became High Sheriff of Derbyshire in 1756. The present three-story, five-bayed entrance front in the Georgian style dates from this period.

In the 18th and 19th centuries, the house was often rented out to tenants. The Alderwasley estate was sold in the 1930s and Castern became the family's principal residence once again before being sold again by the family.

The house was substantially featured in Agatha Christie's Poirot in the episode "The Mystery of Hunter's Lodge". Other movies and series that have been shot there were Jane Eyre (1983), The Hound of the Baskervilles (1988), Far from the Madding Crowd (1997) and Jonathan Creek: Frog Hollow (1999).

== See also ==
- Grade II* listed buildings in Staffordshire Moorlands
- Listed buildings in Ilam, Staffordshire
