= Throwley Old Hall =

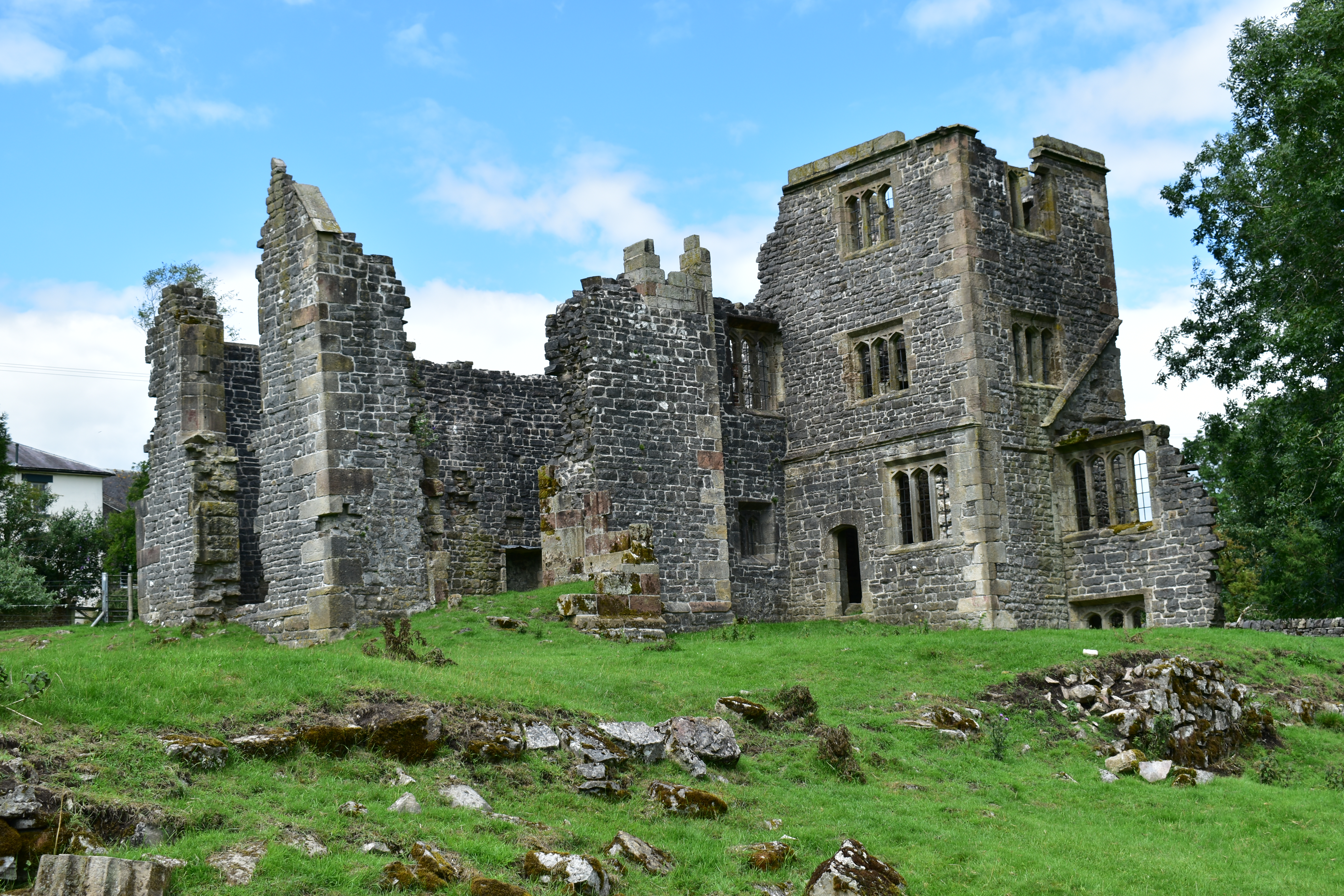
- Viewed from the south-east
- Interactive map of Throwley Old Hall

General information
- Type: Stately home
- Architectural style: Tudor architecture
- Location: Near Calton, Staffordshire grid reference SK 111 525
- Coordinates: 53°4′11″N 1°50′11″W
- Completed: Early 16th century

Listed Building – Grade II*
- Official name: Throwley Old Hall remains
- Designated: 2 May 1953
- Reference no.: 1374740

Scheduled monument
- Official name: Throwley Old Hall
- Designated: 21 December 1976
- Reference no.: 1006114

Throwley Old Hall is a ruined stately home near the village of Calton and adjacent to the River Manifold, in north-east Staffordshire, England.

It is a Grade II* listed building and a scheduled monument. The estate is privately owned.

The house is aligned north-east/south-west; it has two storeys, with a square tower, of three storeys, attached to the north-east corner.

S. C. Hall, writing in the mid-19th century, described the house when it was intact: "It is built of the limestone of the neighbourhood, quoined with larger gritstones; and its walls bear a very time-worn appearance. On the Eastern side, its gables, large bayed window of many lights, divided by stone mullions, terminating in depressed arches, and its strong square tower, carry us back to the Sixteenth Century the period of its erection." By 1921 the building's condition was similar to its present state.

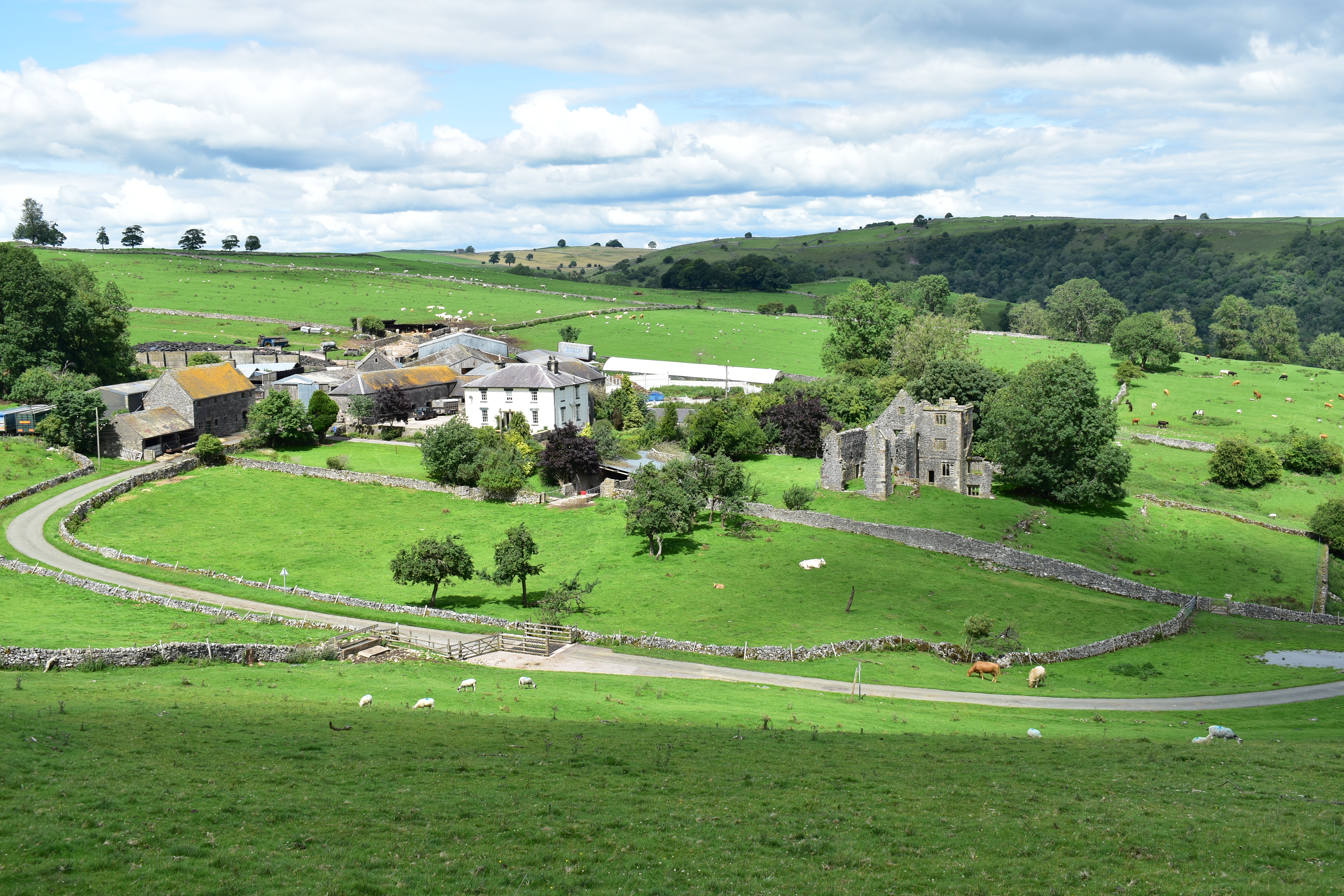
The ruins of Throwley Old Hall next to Throwley Cottages and the farm

== Meverell and Cromwell families ==
The 16th-century writer Sampson Erdeswicke wrote: "Throwley is a fair, ancient house, and goodly demesne; being the seat of the Meverells, a very ancient house of gentlemen and of goodly living, equalling the best sort of gentlemen in the Shire."

Oliver de Meverell was settled here by 1203. The surviving building dates from the early 16th century. The last Meverell at Throwley Hall was Robert Meverell (died 5 February 1626); there is an alabaster tomb in the Church of the Holy Cross, Ilam, containing the remains of Robert and his wife Elizabeth (died 5 August 1628). The inscription informs that their only child married Thomas Lord Cromwell, Viscount Lecale, later Earl of Ardglass (a descendant of Henry VIII's minister Thomas Cromwell).

== Subsequent ownership ==
After the Cromwell family, Throwley Hall was later owned by Edward Southwell, 21st Baron de Clifford; he sold it to Samuel Crompton in 1790, who passed it to his son Sir Samuel Crompton, 1st Baronet. It was afterwards owned by Earl Cathcart.

Francis Allen Parramore (1795–1862) lived at Throwley Hall from around 1836; his son, William Thomas Parramore (1840–1913) lived there until 1877, when he and his family went to live in Australia.
