= Beorhthelm of Stafford =

Legendary Anglo-Saxon saint

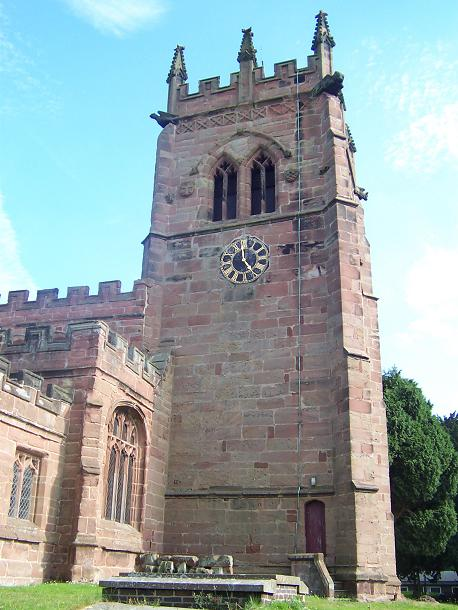
St Bertoline's Church, Barthomley

Beorhthelm (also Bertelin, Bertoline, Bertram and Bettelin) was an Anglo-Saxon saint about whom the only evidence is legendary. He is said to have had a hermitage on the island of Bethnei, which later became the town of Stafford. Later he went to a more hilly area, possibly near Ilam, where he died. Beorhthelm of Stafford is venerated as a saint in the Eastern Orthodox Church and Catholic Church, with a feast day on 10 August.

== Name ==
Beorhthelm's name appears in a very wide range of spellings, partly reflecting scribal error, partly folk-etymological identification with other names prominent in Christian tradition, such as Bartholomew. Jane Crawford concluded that his name was either Bertelm or Bertelin. More recently, John Blair has preferred the former option, using the standardised Old English spelling Beorhthelm. Nonetheless, some scholars stick with the spelling Bertellin this is used in the Life of this saint.

== Early sources ==
An early-eleventh-century Anglo-Saxon litany mentions a confessor as 'Sancte Byrhthelm', while a list of saints' resting-places put together by Hugh Candidus in Peterborough Abbey in the twelfth century and thought to have drawn on earlier sources places 'sanctus Berthelmus martyr' in 'Stefford'. Several churches were dedicated to him in the Middle Ages, and Alan Thacker has argued that these dedications date back to the tenth century, though the evidence is only circumstantial.

== Hagiography ==
The earliest account of Beorhtelm's life is a Vita Bertellini, found in the Nova Legenda Angliae printed in 1516 by Wynkyn de Worde, but scholars agree that this is based on a lost manuscript and that the text as we have it originated around the twelfth century. Bertram is said to have lived some time in the eighth century. The son of a Mercian king, he was a friend and pupil of Saint Guthlac. After Guthlac's death around 715, Beorthelm established a hermitage on the peninsula named Betheney. This account shows the conflation with the story of Beorhthelm with that of Beccel, a minor character in the Vita sancti Guthlaci (added into the account of Bertram via a now-lost adaptation of the Vita composed by Peter of Blois in the twelfth century). Bertram is said to have converted many to Christianity, and reputedly was able to work miraculous cures through his prayers. The ill-will of jealous detractors led him to relocate to Ilam, in Dovedale, where he eventually died. The most unusual miracle in this vita is the following story (as translated by Lindy Brady):

Bertellin, of pious, royal, and English descent, noble in lineage and appearance, even nobler in his orthodox faith, not wanting to stain his life with the wantonness of his father, he crossed the sea. And after he had stayed with a certain Irish king, he earned the favour of his affection more than any other man. But since for the sake of greater future penance, our Father—you who are in heaven—sometimes does not prevent some men from sinning, Bertellin was pierced by love for the king’s daughter, and he carried her off into a part of England since she was pregnant. (I mention this so that sinners will be familiar with the cause of his miraculous penance.) When they were hiding in the thick woods, as you might expect, behold! the time for giving birth appeared, then the end to the pain, and a river of grief followed for them. Oh, how mournful is childbirth! When Bertellin was seeking out the necessary aid of a midwife, the woman, together with her newborn, died in the teeth of wolves.)

This scene is thought to be depicted on the medieval fonts of the Church of the Holy Cross, Ilam in Staffordshire, and of St Mary's Church, Tissington in Derbyshire.

== Veneration ==
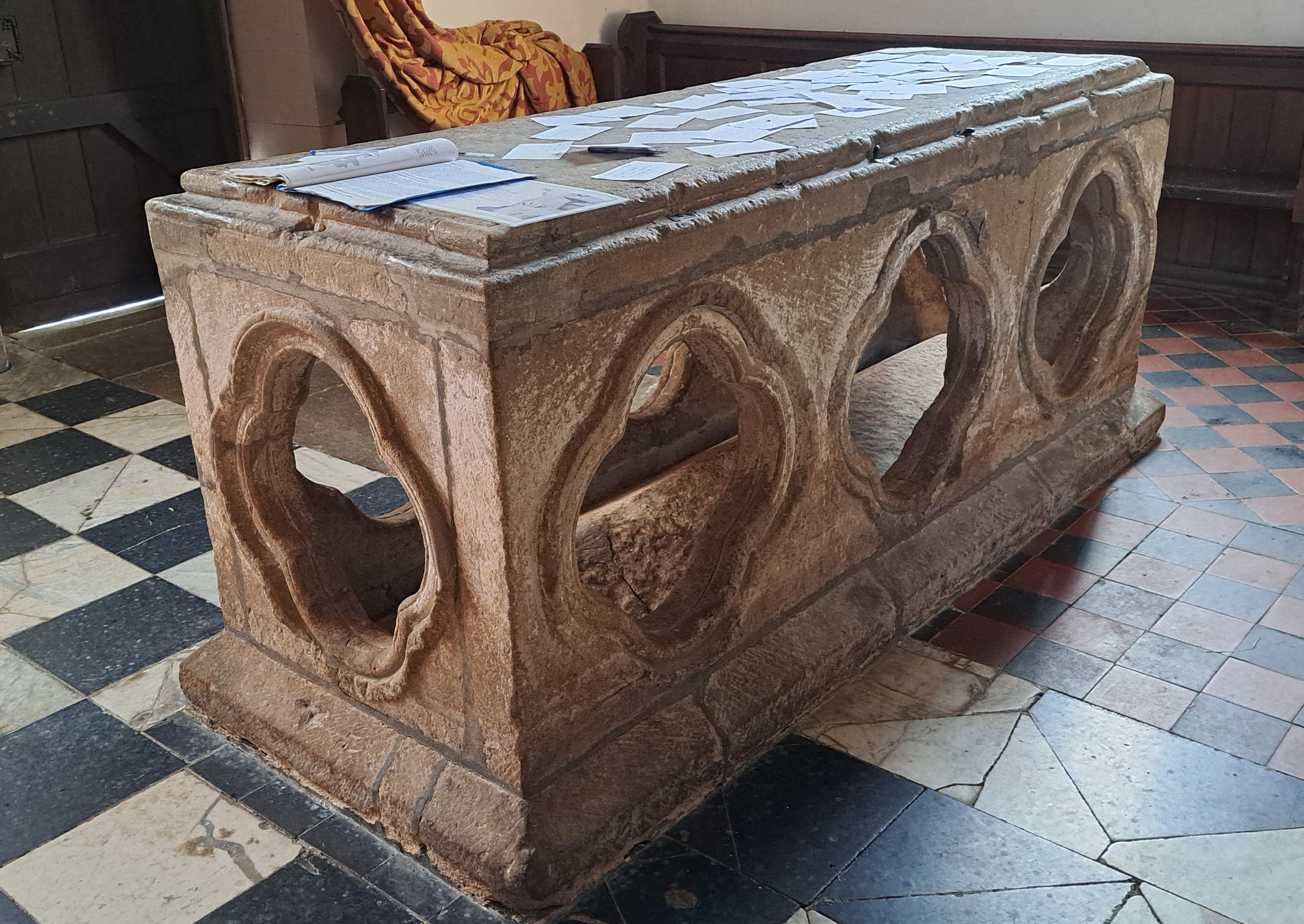
The altar tomb in the Church of the Holy Cross, Ilam

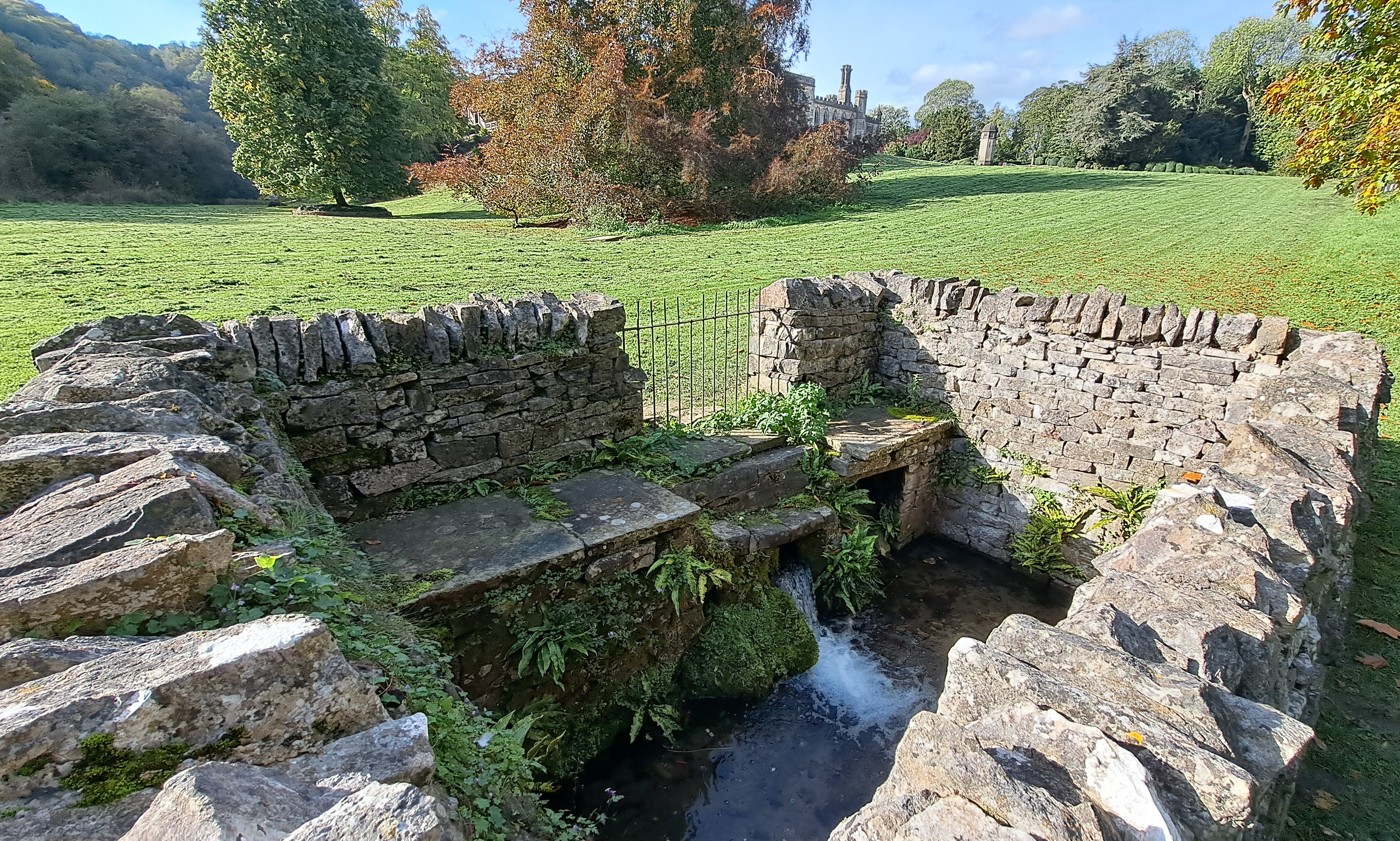
St Bertram's Well at Ilam

His shrine is in the Church of the Holy Cross, Ilam, Staffordshire, and became a point of pilgrimage in the Middle Ages. An altar tomb, which dates from either the thirteenth or fourteenth century, now marks the site of the shrine. The tomb has openings in its sides, known as foramina which allowed pilgrims to touch or kiss a relic. St Bertram's Well is near the church; the stone structure that surrounds the well is post-medieval.

He is the patron saint of Stafford. There are some remains of the medieval shrine of St Beorhthelm near the west end of St Mary's Collegiate Church in Stafford.

The priory of Augustinian canons founded in 1115 on the south bank of the River Mersey at Runcorn, Cheshire, initially dedicated to Beorhthelm, was adopted from the dedication to him of an Anglo-Saxon church already existing on the site. This priory was the predecessor of Norton Priory.

In Barthomley, now in Cheshire, there stands the only church dedicated to the saint, St Bertoline's Church, Barthomley.

== Identity with St Bertelme of Fécamp ==
Some modern sources speak of a St Bertelme of Fécamp, understood to be a different saint from St Beorhthelm. Lindy Brady, however, has shown that this figure is in fact St Beorhthelm himself, who was duplicated by scholarly confusion over the spelling of his name.

== Sources ==
- Bowkett, L.C. (1986) The Stafford Hinterland – An archaeological review from the Roman Invasion to circa 850 AD
