= Listed buildings in Ilam, Staffordshire =

Ilam is a civil parish in the district of Staffordshire Moorlands, Staffordshire, England. It contains 37 listed buildings that are recorded in the National Heritage List for England. Of these, three are listed at Grade I, the highest of the three grades, five are at Grade II*, the middle grade, and the others are at Grade II, the lowest grade. The parish contains the village of Ilam and the surrounding area. Many of the houses, cottages and the school in the village are listed. Near to the village is Ilam Hall, a former country house, which is listed together with associated structures. Near the hall is the listed Church of the Holy Cross, Ilam, with listed items in the churchyard, including two ancient cross shafts. To the north of the village is Castern Hall, another country house, which is listed together with associated structures. The other listed buildings include farmhouses and farm buildings, bridges, and a memorial in the form of an Eleanor Cross.

== Key ==
Grade	Criteria
I	Buildings of exceptional interest, sometimes considered to be internationally important
II*	Particularly important buildings of more than special interest
II	Buildings of national importance and special interest

== Buildings ==
Name and location	Photograph	Date	Notes	Grade
Cross Shaft 7 yards south of the church 53.05322°N 1.80334°W		10th century (probable)	The cross is in the churchyard of the Church of the Holy Cross. It is in stone, and consists of the socket stone, the shaft, and part of the head. The lower part of the shaft is circular and tapering, and rises to a collar, above which it is rectangular, and continues to taper. Below the collar is a carved band of foliage, and above it is interlace decoration on three sides and Greek key on the other. At the top is a circular boss.The cross is also a scheduled monument.	I
Cross Shaft 15 yards south of the church 53.05319°N 1.80357°W		10th century (probable)	The cross is in the churchyard of the Church of the Holy Cross. It is about 7 feet (2.1 m) high, in stone, and consists of the socket stone, the shaft, and part of the head. It has an oblong section, and tapers towards the top. On three sides there is curved interlace decoration and circular or spiral designs. The figures include two birds and three human bodies. The cross is also a scheduled monument.	I
Church of the Holy Cross; 53.05336°N 1.80352°W		11th century (probable)	The church was partly rebuilt in the 13th century, the south chapel was added in 1618, the north chapel in 1831, and in 1855–56 there was a major restoration by George Gilbert Scott. The church is built in stone with tiled roofs, and consists of a nave, a north aisle, a chancel, north and south chapels, and a west tower with a saddleback roof. The south chapel, St Bertram's Chapel, has a Tudor arched doorway and a hood mould ending in busts, and square-headed windows. The north chapel, a memorial chapel, is much larger, and has an octagonal plan.	I
Grave cover south of the church 53.05311°N 1.80363°W	—	13th century (probable)	The grave cover is in stone and has been re-used as a headstone. It has a roughly oblong shape, and tapers slightly. On the front is carved interlace and foliate cross decoration.	II*
Lower Damgate Farmhouse, stable and loft 53.07785°N 1.80948°W		Early to mid 18th century	A limestone farmhouse that has a tile roof with coped verges on kneelers. There are three storeys, a T-shaped plan, and a front of three bays. It has one casement window, and the other windows have chamfered mullions. To the left is a stable and loft dating from the 19th century, with external steps leading to an upper floor doorway.	II
Castern Hall; 53.06864°N 1.81751°W		c. 1740	The country house is a remodelling of a former house, and incorporates earlier material. It is in stone with rusticated quoins, a moulded eaves cornice, and a hipped slate roof. There are three storeys and five bays, the middle bay projecting slightly, and a rear wing on the left. The central doorway has Doric pilasters, an oblong fanlight, and a moulded hood cornice. The windows are sashes with raised surrounds, the window above the doorway has a triangular pediment, and the window above it has a keystone.	II*
Gate piers, walls and steps, Castern Hall; 53.06847°N 1.81770°W		c. 1740	The gate piers in front of the hall are in rusticated stone, and each pier has a square section, an overhanging moulded cap, and an urn finial with a gadrooned base and a ball finial. The walls enclose a rectangular forecourt, they are ramped down in the centre, and are in stone with quoins and coping. On the right side is a flight of steps with a flanking wall on the right, and the gates are in cast iron.	II*
Bridge View Cottage; 53.05492°N 1.79947°W		18th century (probable)	The house is in limestone, with quoins. and a tile roof with coped verges on kneelers. There are two storeys, a roughly T-shaped plan, a front of three bays, and a rear extension. The windows are mullioned with three lights, those in the ground floor with hood moulds.	II
St. Bertram's Bridge; 53.05217°N 1.80345°W		18th century	The bridge, running from the south of Ilam Park, crosses the River Manifold. It was restored in 1839, and is in stone, consisting of a single semicircular arch with a hump back. The bridge has a chamfered parapet band coming to a point over the arch. It is also a scheduled monument.	II
Ilam Hall and Gardener's Cottage; 53.05305°N 1.80540°W		1821–26	The hall is part of a former country house, later used for other purposes. It is in stone with slate roofs and in Gothic style. The east front is in three parts, with a three-storey tower on the left, a central range with a stair turret and an embattled parapet, and a porte-cochère that has an octagonal turret with a ball finial to the right. To the north is a service courtyard that has a central gatehouse with a four-centred arch, and to the north of this is the gardener's cottage. This is in limestone with a hipped slate roof, two storeys, an L-shaped plan, and a front of three bays. The windows in all parts are mullioned or mullioned and transomed.	II*
Bridge over River Manifold; 53.05441°N 1.79914°W		Early 19th century	The bridge carries a road over the River Manifold. It is in stone, and consists of three four-centred arches. The bridge has a moulded parapet band, a coped parapet, and semi-octagonal buttresses towards each end. The parapet wall continues for about 20 yards (18 m) to the west.	II
Castern Farmhouse; 53.07073°N 1.81782°W		Early 19th century (probable)	The farmhouse is in limestone with quoins and a tile roof. There are two storeys and an attic, and a T-shaped plan, with a front range of three bays, and a rear extension. The doorway has a flat hood, and the windows are mullioned with casements.	II
Rushley Bridge; 53.06162°N 1.81641°W		Early 19th century	The bridge carries a road over the River Manifold. It is in stone, and consists of three arches, the central arch larger and semi-elliptical, and the others smaller and semicircular. The bridge has voussoirs, buttresses on each side of the middle arch, and a plain parapet.	II
Townend Cottage; 53.05541°N 1.79855°W		Early 19th century (probable)	A farmhouse in limestone, with a bracketed gutter, overhanging eaves, and a tile roof. There are two storeys and two bays. The central doorway has a segmental head, and the windows are casements, also with segmental heads.	II
Upper Damgate Farmhouse; 53.07709°N 1.81221°W		Early 19th century (probable)	A limestone farmhouse that has a tile roof with coped verges. There are three storeys, two parallel ranges, and three bays. The doorway has a bracketed hood, and the windows are mullioned.	II
Coach house and stable block, Ilam Hall; 53.05277°N 1.80594°W		c. 1830	The coach house and stable block possibly contain earlier material, and were later used for other purposes. They are in limestone, with quoins, and a tile roof with coped verges on kneelers, and gables with pinnacles. There are two storeys, and a U-shaped plan with a main range, previously the coach house, of six bays, and one-bay wings, previously the stables. In the main range are five four-centred arches, in the outer bays and in the wings are doorways with Tudor arches, and the windows have moulded mullions and hood moulds.	II
Tower north of Ilam Hall; 53.05346°N 1.80511°W		c. 1830	The tower, possibly a former dovecote, is in stone, on a plinth, and it has an octagonal plan. Steps lead up to a doorway, and there are lancet windows in alternate faces. The top stage consists of panels alternately containing a blank shield, or a cruciform loop. Above are crested eaves, and an eight-sided dome surmounted by a ball finial.	II
Turret, loggia, steps and parapet, Ilam Hall; 53.05254°N 1.80519°W		c. 1830	The structures are in stone and form a roughly square plan. At the northeast corner is a D-shaped projection that leads to a flight of steps flanked by square piers with moulded caps. At the southeast corner is a square turret with a lancet window and an embattled parapet. Between these is a seven-bay loggia with four-centred arches and a corbelled, moulded cornice to an openwork parapet.	II
Gate, gatepiers and adjoining walls, Ilam Park; 53.05520°N 1.80165°W		c. 1830	The gate piers and walls at the entrance to the park are in stone, and the gate is in cast iron. To the right of the drive is a pedestrian gateway with an embattled parapet, flanked by octagonal turrets, the one on the right larger and also embattled. To the left of the drive is the stump of a turret and a short wall, both embattled, and to the left of this is a coped wall extending for about 30 yards (27 m).	II
Dovedale House; 53.05475°N 1.80219°W		c. 1840	A vicarage, later used for other purposes, it is in stone, it has a slate roof with coped verges, and is in Gothic style. There are two storeys and an attic, and a front of three bays, the middle bay containing a projecting two-storey gabled porch. The porch has a four-centred arch with an oriel window above. The windows are mullioned with hood moulds, and contain casements.	II
Mrs. Watts-Russell Memorial; 53.05467°N 1.79955°W		1840	The memorial is in the form of an Eleanor Cross standing in the centre of a road junction. It is in stone, with six sides, a base, and three stages. The lowest stage contains panels with trefoil heads and shafts with pointed crocketed hoods, The middle stage has niches containing statues under crocketed pointed hoods and crocketed finials, and in the top stage is a shaft surmounted by a cross.	II*
River Lodge; 53.06271°N 1.81003°W		1840	The house is in limestone and has a tile roof with gables and shaped bargeboards. It is in Gothic style, and has one storey and an attic, a front of two bays, and two rear ranges. The central doorway has a cambered lintel and sunken spandrels, and the windows are cross windows with mullions and transoms and hood moulds. On the south gable end is a canted bay window. There is an inscription above the door.	II
Beechenhill Farmhouse; 53.06992°N 1.80883°W	—	Mid 19th century	The farmhouse is in stone with quoins, and has a tile roof with coped verges. There are two storeys and two bays. The central doorway has a flat bracketed hood, and the windows are mullioned and contain casements.	II
House, cottage and cowhouse east of Beechenhill Farmhouse; 53.06992°N 1.80850°W	—	Mid 19th century	The buildings are in stone with tile roofs, and form an L-shaped plan. The house and cottage have two storeys and three bays, and contain pivoted and casement windows. The cowhouse to the right has three ground floor doors, a loft door and ventilation slits. The extension to the east has doors and a loft opening.	II
Coach house, stables and hayloft, Castern Hall; 53.06897°N 1.81751°W		Mid 19th century	The buildings are in stone with quoins and tile roofs, and form three ranges round a courtyard. The west range has two storeys and four bays, and contains a coach door, stable doors, windows, and external steps leading to a doorway in the upper storey. The north range has two storeys and three bays, and contains stable doors and a loft opening. The east range has one storey and contains doors.	II
Church Lodge; 53.05349°N 1.80295°W		Mid 19th century	The lodge is in limestone and has a hipped stone slate roof. There is one storey and a roughly T-shaped plan. The north front has two bays, the left bay projecting and gabled with coped verges and a finial. It contains two six-light mullioned and transomed windows with hood moulds. On the south front is a gabled porch, and an extension to the rear wing contains a Tudor arched doorway.	II
Cartshed, stables and granary west of Townend Cottage; 53.05555°N 1.79900°W	—	Mid 19th century	The buildings are in stone with quoins, the roofs are tiled with coped verges, and they have an L-shaped plan. The cartshed and stable have a single storey and contain a pair of carriage entries, and to the right are a projecting stable and granary with external steps lead to an upper floor doorway.	II
Stable and cartshed north west of Townend Cottage; 53.05555°N 1.79836°W	—	Mid 19th century	The building is in stone with quoins and a tile roof. There is one storey and a symmetrical front of four bays. The outer bays contain stable-like doors and fixed windows, and in the centre are two cart entries separated by a square brick pier. There is another fixed window in the left gable end.	II
Ilam School; 53.05577°N 1.80122°W		1854	The school, designed by George Gilbert Scott, is in limestone, with quoins, and a tile roof, and is in Gothic style. There is one storey and a front of three bays, the middle bay a projecting gabled porch, with shaped and painted bargeboards, and wooden lattice work in the gable. The porch contains a pair of doorways with segmental heads, and it is surmounted by a belfry with openwork superstructure, a spire and a weathervane. In the outer bays are double windows, and above the left bay is a dormer with shaped bargeboards.	II
Croft Cottage; 53.05603°N 1.80025°W		c. 1855	The cottage is in limestone and has a tile roof. There is one storey and an attic, two bays, a rear wing, and lean-to extensions on the sides. The windows are casements, and there are two corbelled-out gabled dormers. The gables have shaped bargeboards.	II
Dove Cottage and Manifold Cottage; 53.05510°N 1.80029°W		c. 1855	A pair of cottages designed by George Gilbert Scott, they are in limestone, with quoins, hung tiles in the attics, and a tile roof. There is one storey and attics. Dove Cottage to the right has three bays, with a two-storey gabled porch in the centre, containing a doorway with a shouldered head, and a gabled dormer above. In the ground floor are windows with chamfered surrounds and chamfered mullions containing casements, and in the attic are gabled dormers. To the left, Manifold Cottage is gabled and contains a canted bay window with a three-sided roof, and to its left is a projecting wing. All but one of the gables has shaped bargeboards.	II
Fountain Cottages; 53.05521°N 1.79999°W		c. 1855	A pair of cottages designed by George Gilbert Scott, they are in limestone, with quoins, hung tiles in the attics, and a tile roof. There is one storey and attics, a front of five bays, and projecting wings on the sides. On the front are two projecting gabled bays that contain canted bay windows with hipped roofs, and between them are gabled dormers. The gables have shaped bargeboards.	II
Gatehouse Lodge; 53.05526°N 1.80182°W		c. 1855	The lodge at the entrance to Ilam Park was designed by George Gilbert Scott. It is in limestone, with quoins and a tile roof. There is one storey, a T-shaped plan, and two bays, the left bay forming a gabled cross-wing. The cross-wing contains a five-light bay window, and the gable has bracketed lattice work, shaped bargeboards, and a finial. In the angle is a gabled porch, also with lattice work and bargeboards. The windows are leaded casements and the lights have trefoil heads.	II
Home Farmhouse; 53.05547°N 1.79975°W		c. 1855	The farmhouse is in limestone, with quoins, and a tile roof with crested ridge tiles. It consists of a main block with two storeys and two bays, a single-storey kitchen wing to the left, a two-storey extension at right angles further to the left, and a rear wing. The windows are casements, and the gables have shaped bargeboards.	II
School House; 53.05594°N 1.80158°W		c. 1855	The house, which was designed by George Gilbert Scott, has a ground floor in stone with quoins, the upper parts are timber framed, and the roof is tiled. There are two storeys, two bays under a gable, and a lean-to porch on the right. In the ground floor are two three-light mullioned windows containing leaded casements, and in the upper floor is a five-light oriel window. The gable is jettied, and has diamond-pattern framing, and cusped bargeboards. In the porch is a doorway with an ogee head.	II
The Cottage; 53.05512°N 1.80053°W		c. 1855	A cottage designed by George Gilbert Scott, it is in limestone, with quoins and a tile roof. There is one storey and an attic, and three bays, the middle bay forming a projecting two-storey gabled porch containing a shoulder-headed doorway. The windows are casements, those in the outer bays with chamfered surrounds and chamfered mullions, and in the attic are gabled dormers. The gables have shaped bargeboards.	II
Gate piers and wall, Townend Cottage and other cottages 53.05519°N 1.79870°W	—	c. 1855	The wall is in stone with a coped parapet, and extends for about 300 yards (270 m), with one interruption. It contains five pairs of gate piers, each square with stop chamfered edges, and a gabled cap with a roll-moulded ridge.	II
