= Church of the Holy Cross, Ilam =

Anglican church in Staffordshire, England

Coordinates: 53°03′12″N 1°48′13″W

Church of the Holy Cross
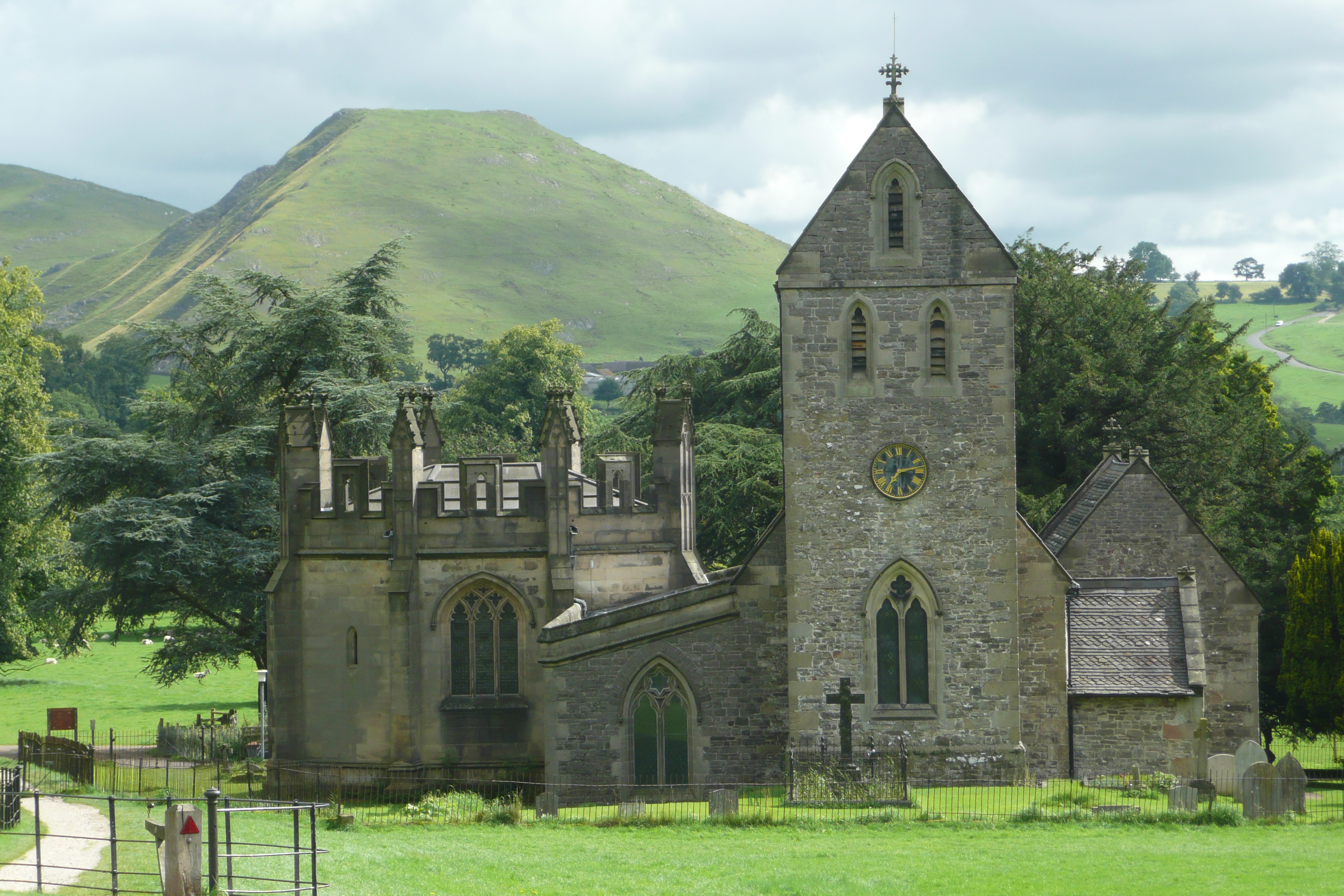
- Ilam Church with Thorpe Cloud behind
- Church of the Holy Cross
- OS grid reference: SK 13269 50697
- Location: Ilam, Staffordshire
- Country: England
- Denomination: Church of England

Architecture
- Heritage designation: Grade I listed building
- Designated: 1967

Administration
- Diocese: Lichfield
- Parish: Ilam

The Church of the Holy Cross is the Church of England parish church of Ilam, Staffordshire, England. It is within the grounds of Ilam Park. The church is a Grade I listed building, and has been since 1967.

== History ==
Although it is almost certain that there was both a settlement and church in Ilam in the 11th century, neither were recorded in the Domesday Book.

The church likely dates from the 11th century. During the 13th century, it was partially rebuilt, and the building was extended both in 1618 and, later, in 1831. In the years 1855 and 1856, Sir George Gilbert Scott restored the church.

== St Bertram's Shrine ==
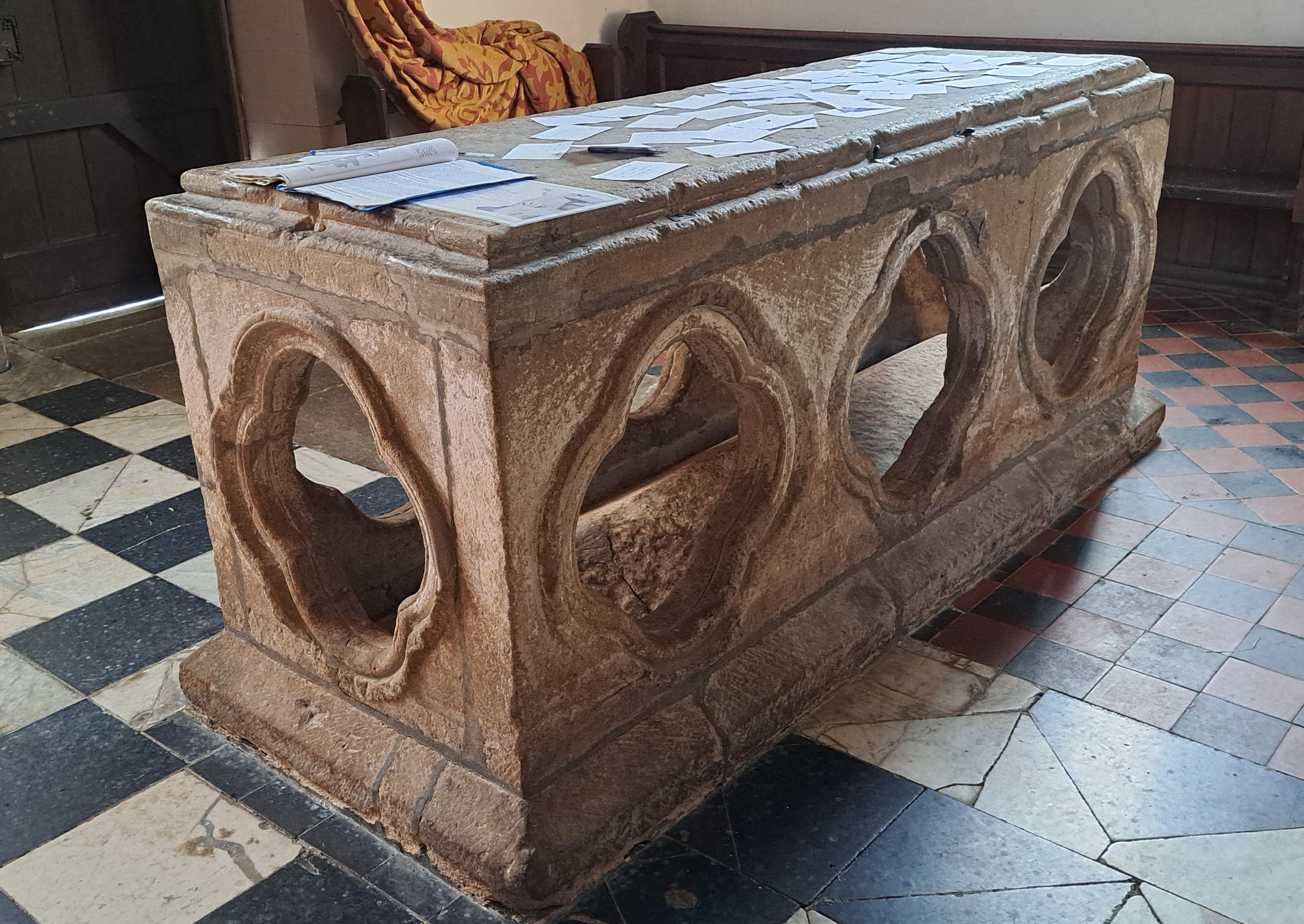
The 13th-century altar tomb

A shrine to Beorhthelm of Stafford (also called St Betram, St Bertram or St Bertelin) was established, after his death in the 8th century, at his grave. An altar tomb, which dates from either the 13th or 14th century, now marks the site of the shrine. The tomb has special openings in its sides that are known as foramina, which allowed pilgrims to touch or kiss a relic. People often put injured limbs through the openings in the hope that they would be healed. The shrine became a popular pilgrimage site in the Middle Ages, and some pilgrims still visit it. The chapel in which the shrine is located was built in 1618.

== Notable features ==
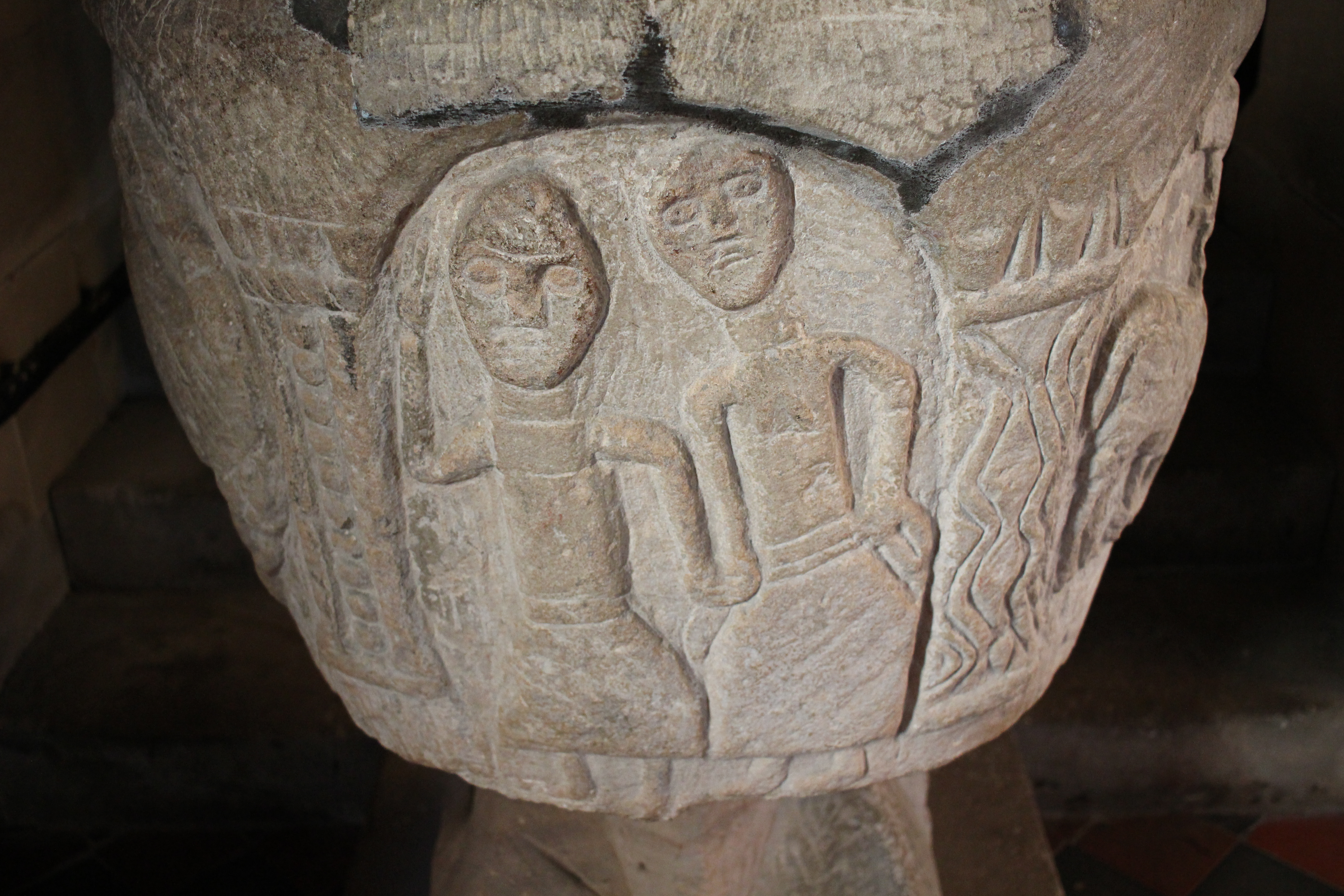
A carving on the church font

=== Anglo-Saxon crosses ===
Within the churchyard, there are two stone cross shafts that date from the Anglo-Saxon period.

=== Church font ===
The historic church font depicts episodes from the life of St Bertram. Although the style of the font is Romanesque, it is possible that it dates from the Anglo-Saxon period.

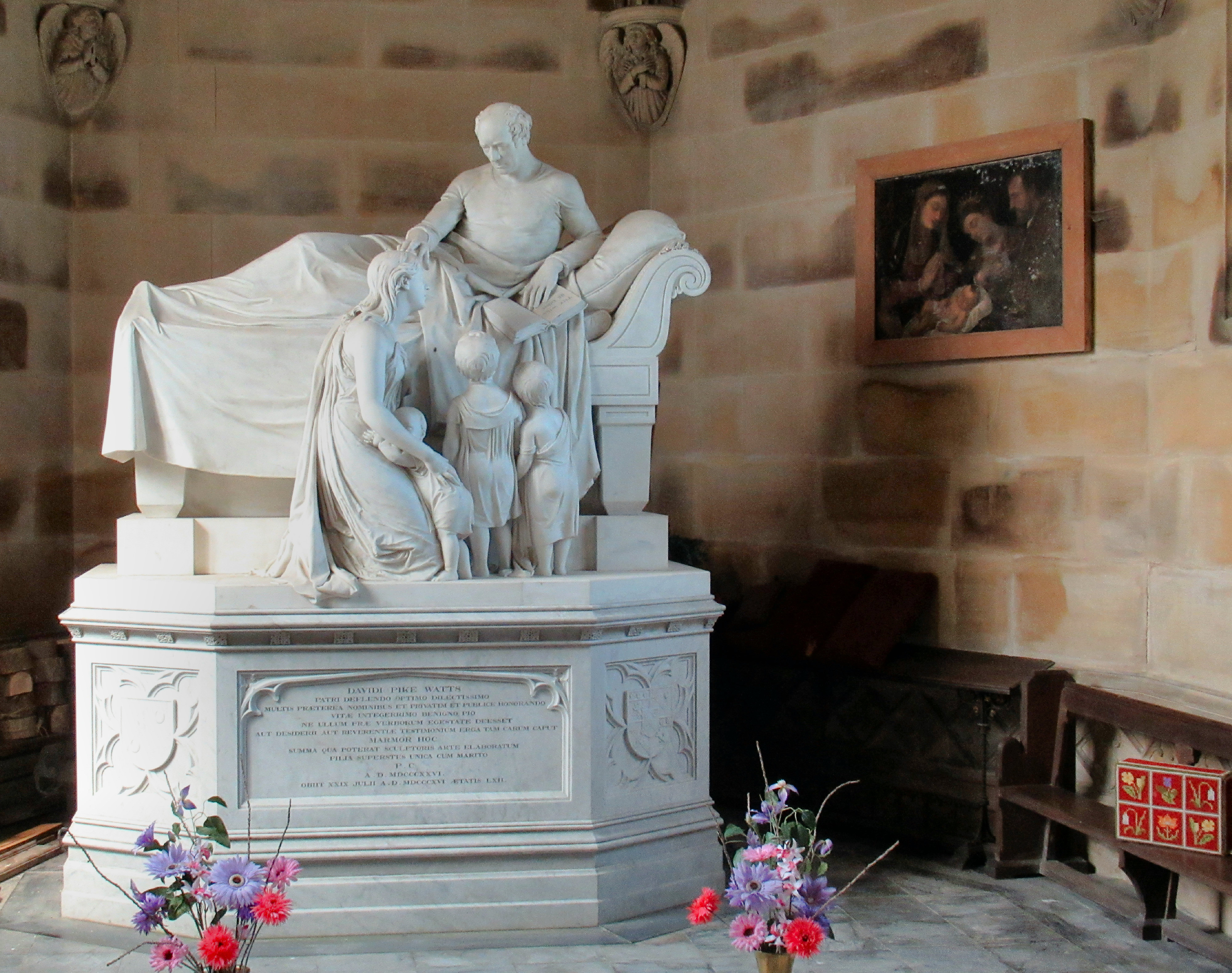
The memorial to David Pike Watts

=== David Pike Watts Chapel ===
The large octagonal north chapel houses a carved memorial to David Pike Watts, a rich brewer who bought Ilam Hall in 1809. The memorial was carved by Sir Francis Chantrey; it was completed in 1831.

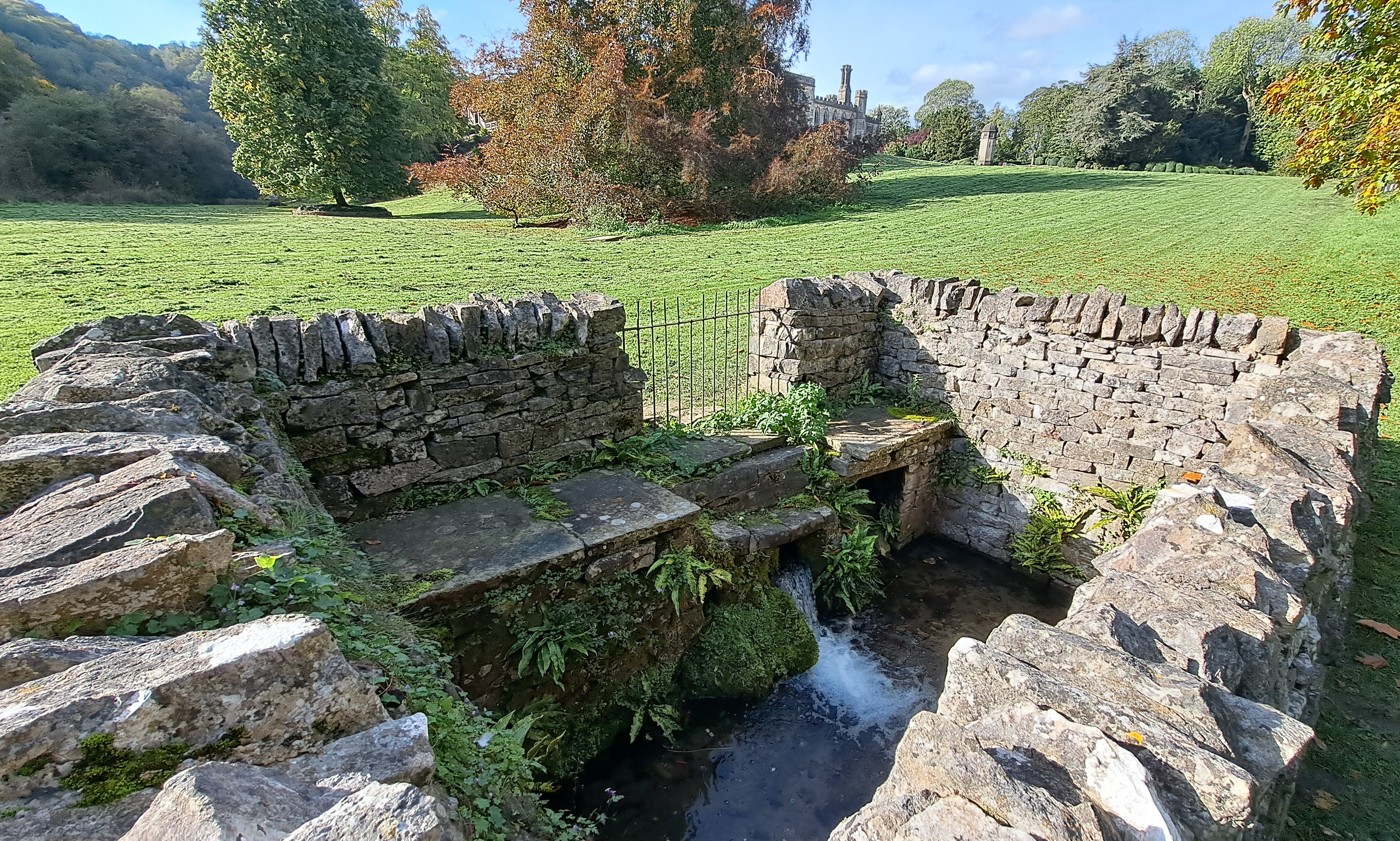
The holy well

== St Bertram's Well ==
Also known as St Bertram's Pool, the holy well is located near to the church. It is thought that the water from this well has probably supplied Ilam with clean water since Anglo-Saxon times. The stone structure that currently surrounds the well is post-medieval.

== See also ==
- Listed buildings in Ilam, Staffordshire
