= Ilam Park =

National Trust property in Ilam, Staffordshire

Coordinates: 53.055°N 1.807°W

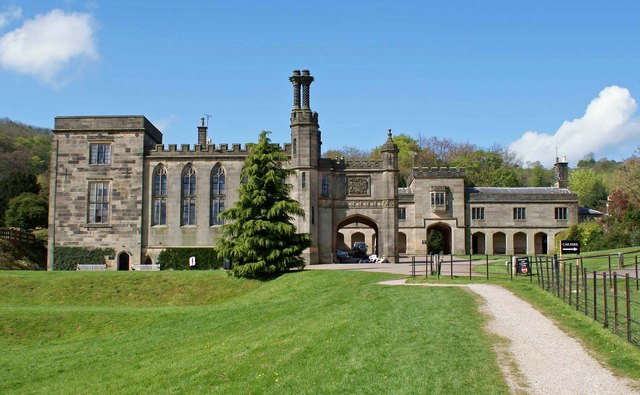
Ilam Hall (in 2009)

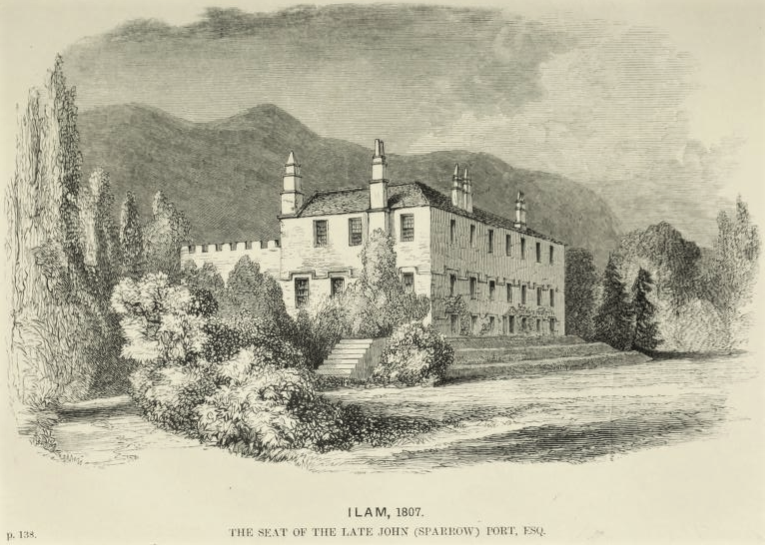
The old Ilam Hall in 1807

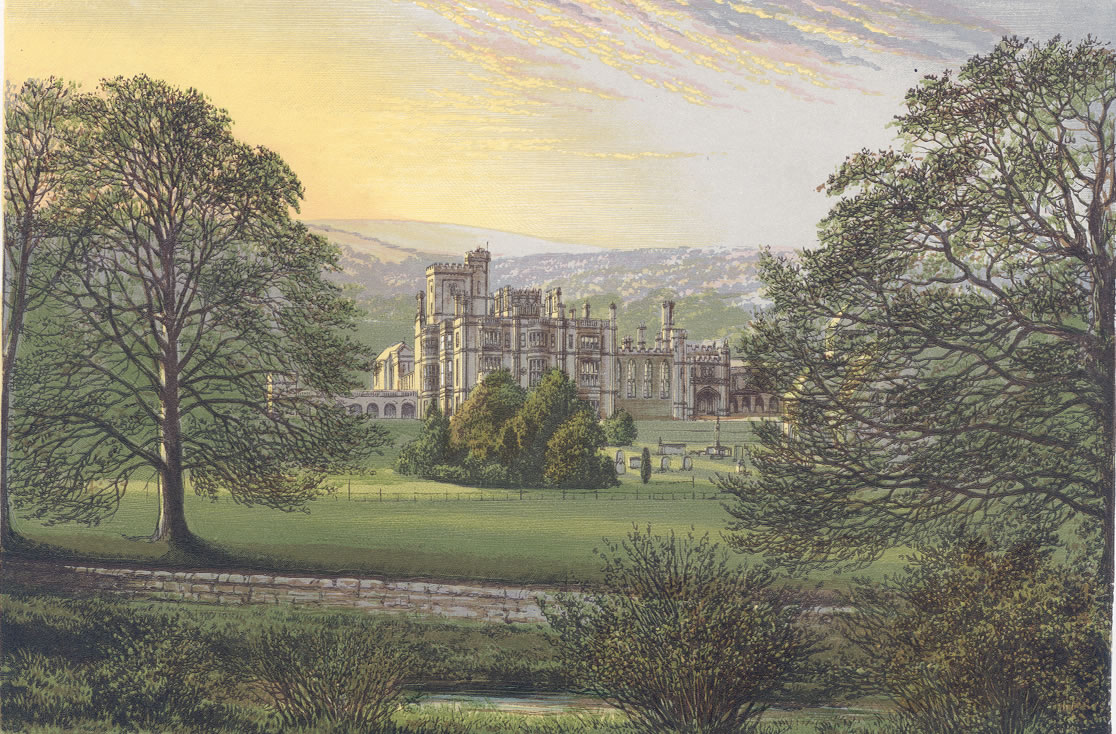
Ilam Hall circa 1880

Ilam Park is a 158-acre (0.64 km^{2}) country park situated in Ilam, Staffordshire, England, on both banks of the River Manifold, five miles (8 km) north west of Ashbourne, Derbyshire, and in the ownership of the National Trust. The property is managed as part of the Trust's White Peak Estate. Ashbourne, the post town, is in Derbyshire and thus so is Ilam's postal address, but the Park and Ilam are in Staffordshire. (The county boundary is the River Dove).

The property consists of Ilam Hall and remnants of its gardens, an ancient semi-natural woodland — Hinkley Wood — designated as a Site of Special Scientific Interest (SSSI), noted for its small-leaved and large-leaved limes and their hybrids.

== Ilam Hall ==
The estate was owned from the 16th century, for over 250 years, by the Port family. John Port had the first hall built in 1546. Both William Congreve and Samuel Johnson stayed at the hall when it was owned by the Port family. Congreve wrote his first play, The Old Bachelor there. After the death of John Port, son of Burslem Sparrow and Frances Newell (daughter and heiress of George Newell and Prudence Port) it was sold to David Pike Watts in 1809. On his death in 1816, the old hall was inherited by his daughter who had married Jesse Russell. Her husband (as Jesse Watts-Russell, High Sheriff of Staffordshire in 1819 and Conservative MP for the rotten borough of Gatton) commissioned James Trubshaw to build a new Hall to designs by John Shaw. The Hall, now a Grade II* listed building, was built between 1821 and 1826. The Reverend Bernard Port, son of John & Mary Port, continued to live in Ilam vicarage until his death in 1854.

Jesse Watts-Russell, a wealthy industrialist, was responsible for the Swiss look of Ilam village; he found that the valley and surrounding hills reminded him of the Alps, and consequently had some new cottages built in the Swiss style and rehoused most of the villagers (who were living in estate-owned houses). His son, John Watts-Russell, moved to New Zealand in 1850 and built another Ilam Hall. The farm/homestead that he created later grew and became the Ilam area of Christchurch.

By the early 1930s the hall had been sold for demolition. The demolition was well advanced when Robert McDougall of Cheadle Hulme bought the estate for the National Trust, on the understanding that the remaining parts (the entrance porch and hall, the Great Hall and the service wing) be used as an international youth hostel. Ilam Hall has been leased to the Youth Hostels Association (England & Wales) (YHA) since 1935. The grounds are open to the public, and are a starting point for one of the prettiest river walks in the area.

The hall is in stone with slate roofs and in Gothic Revival style. The east front is in three parts, with a three-storey tower on the left, a central range with a stair turret and an embattled parapet, and a porte-cochère that has an octagonal turret with a ball finial to the right. To the north is a service courtyard that has a central gatehouse with a four-centred arch, and to the north of this is the gardener's cottage. This is in limestone with a hipped slate roof, two storeys, an L-shaped plan, and a front of three bays. The windows in all parts are mullioned or mullioned and transomed.

The Church of the Holy Cross, Ilam is in the park.

== See also ==
- Listed buildings in Ilam, Staffordshire
- List of youth hostels in England and Wales
