= Ilam, Staffordshire =

Village in Staffordshire, England

Coordinates: 53°03′18″N 1°47′59″W

Ilam
- Village and Civil Parish
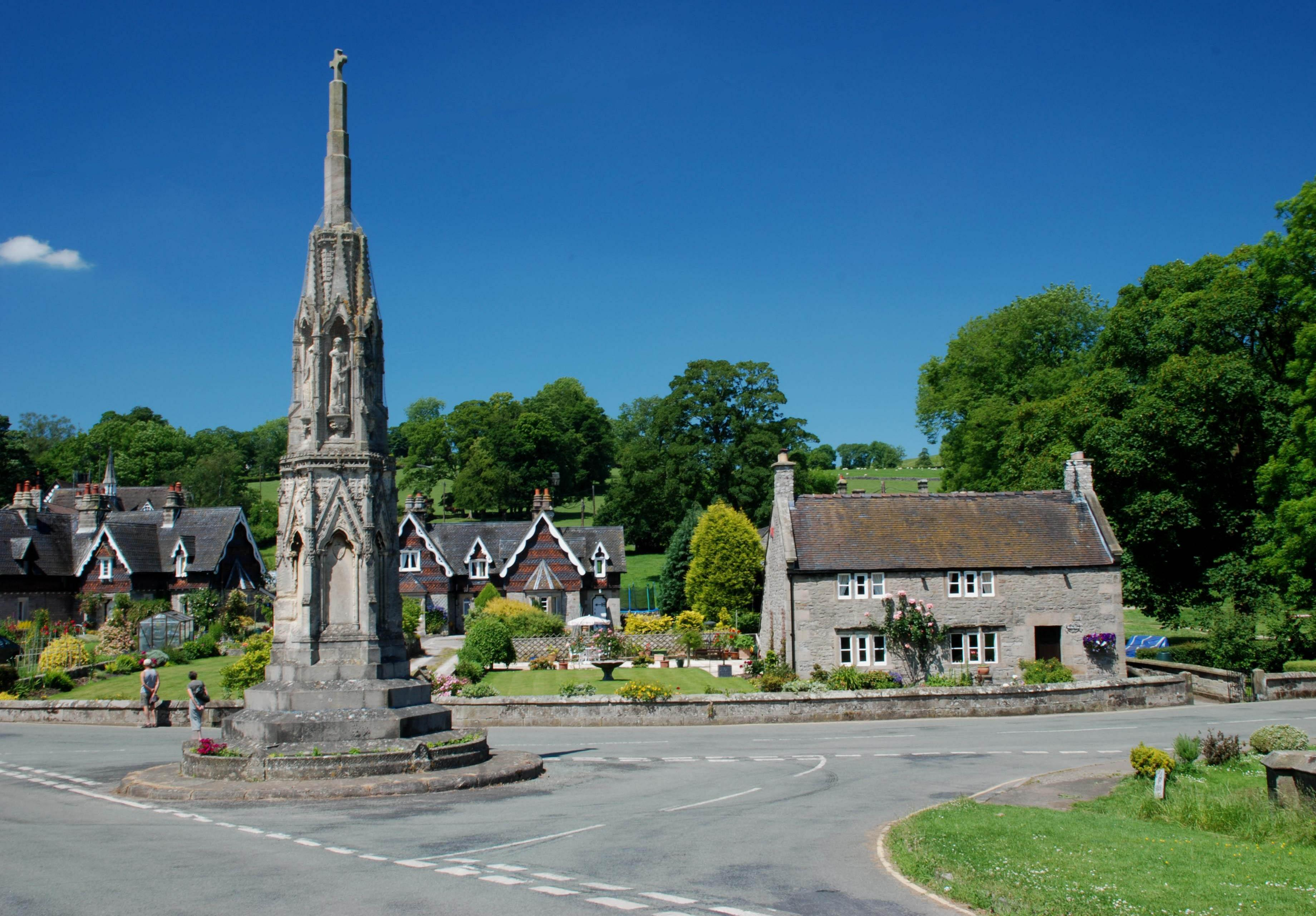
- Ilam Cross

- Location within Staffordshire
- Population: 402 (2011 Census)
- District: Staffordshire Moorlands
- Shire county: Staffordshire
- Region: West Midlands
- Country: England
- Sovereign state: United Kingdom
- Post town: ASHBOURNE
- Postcode district: DE6
- Police: Staffordshire
- Fire: Staffordshire
- Ambulance: West Midlands
- UK Parliament: Staffordshire Moorlands
- Website: https://ilamparishcouncil.co.uk/

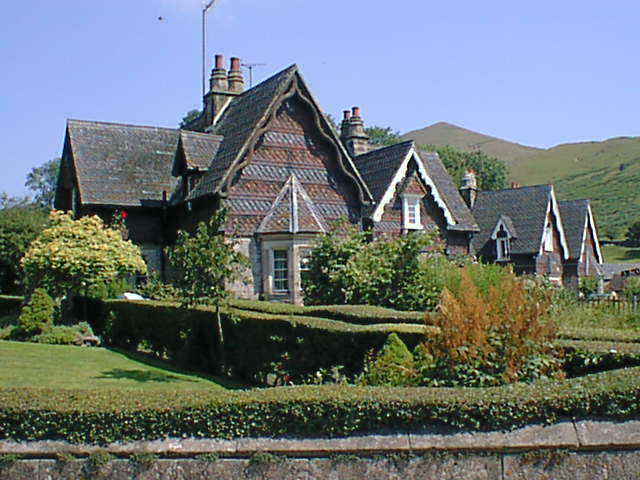
Cottages in the village of Ilam.

Ilam ( /ˈaɪləm/) is a village in the Staffordshire Peak District of England, lying on the River Manifold. The population of the civil parish as taken at the 2011 census was 402.

== Ilam village ==
Ilam is best known as the location of the neo-Gothic Ilam Hall, a stately home built in the 1820s, partly demolished in the 1930s. It is now a YHA youth hostel owned by the National Trust. It is set in large parklands that are open to visitors and is a Grade II* listed property, as "Ilam Hall and Gardeners Cottage".

Many of the cottages are in a style that reminds visitors of a picturesque Swiss village, with chalet-style houses and matching school house. This concept was started in the 1800s by Jesse Watts-Russell, who inherited a fortune on the death of his father, a wealthy soap manufacturer. He built the current Ilam Hall and his family resided there for decades.

Ilam is about 4 miles from Ashbourne at the entrance to the scenic Manifold Valley. Ilam lies close to the popular Dovedale valley.

While most of the buildings in the village are from the past two centuries, Ilam dates from Anglo-Saxon times or earlier.

Recently the village has attracted praise for its commitment to eco- friendly policies. Ilam became the first community in the United Kingdom to phase out incandescent light bulbs, cutting annual carbon emissions by 4 tonnes. The initiative was part of the Ilam Climate Change Project, supported by the Marches Energy Agency.

== Geography ==
Ilam is situated in the Manifold Valley near the southern end where it joins the River Dove. The Dove forms the county boundary between Staffordshire and Derbyshire. Upstream from Ilam is the famous Dovedale walk to Milldale. At the Ilam end, the walk crosses the Dove on a famous line of stepping stones. A wide and picturesque curve of the Manifold provides an ideal setting for Ilam Hall. The Peak District Boundary Walk runs through the village along the same route as the Manifold Trail footpath.

=== River Manifold ===
The River Manifold flows underground from Wetton Mill, and rises again at Ilam in the grounds of the hall. The flooded underground section contains a population of European bullhead fish. At some times of the year, the river bed is completely dry apart from the occasional pool.

== Ilam Hall ==
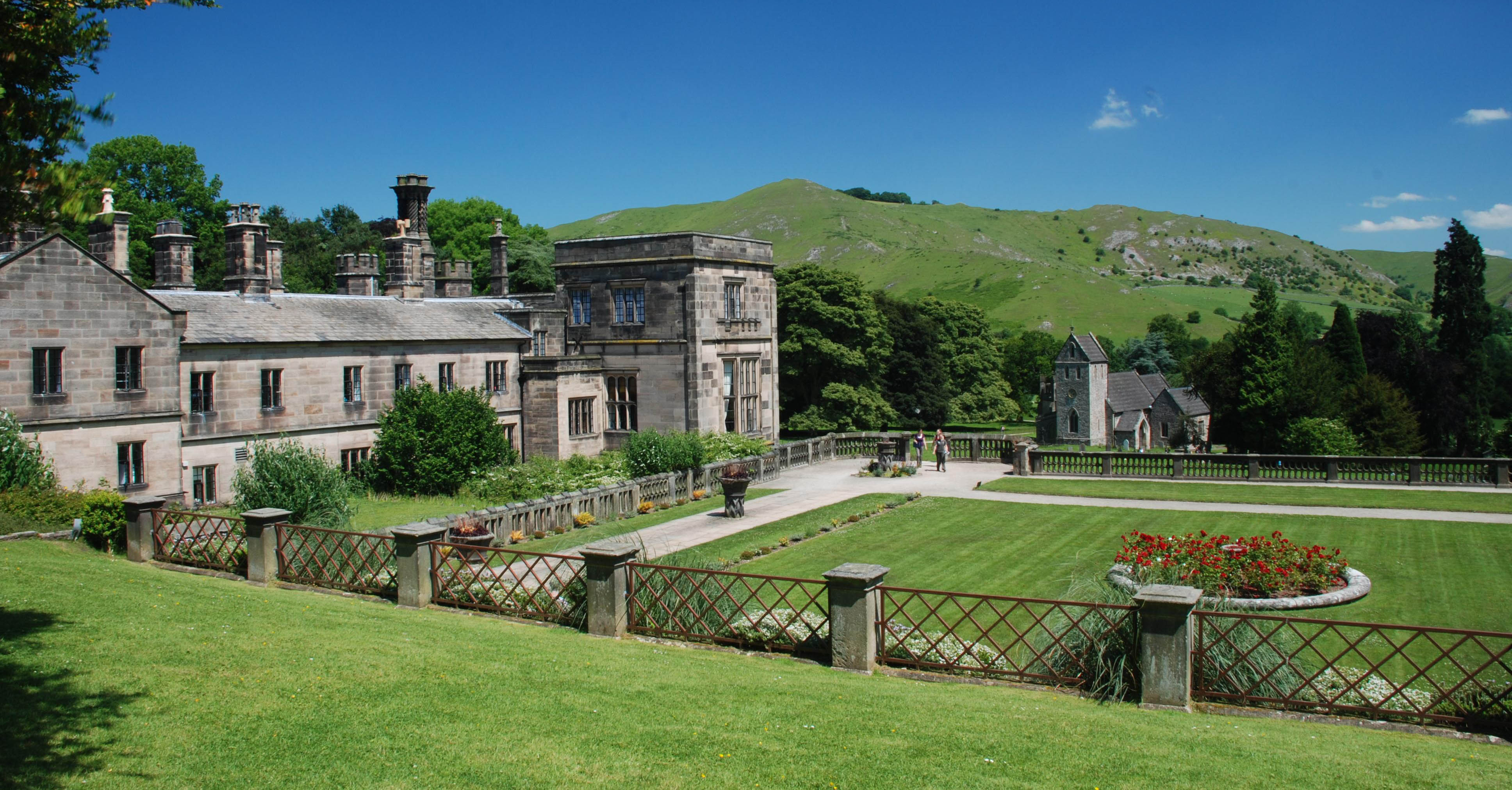
Illam Hall

John Port had the first hall built in 1546. Both William Congreve and Samuel Johnson stayed at the hall when it was owned by the Port family. Congreve wrote his first play, The Old Bachelor there and Paradise valley inspired Johnson to write his novel Rasselas.

In 1820 the estate was bought by Jesse Watts-Russell, a wealthy industrialist. It was Watts-Russell who was responsible for the Swiss look of Ilam; he found that the valley and surrounding hills reminded him of the Alps, and consequently had some new cottages built in the Swiss style and rehoused most of the villagers (who were living in estate-owned houses anyway). He also built the school in 1857 and funded it, at a time when schooling was not compulsory.

His son, John Watts-Russell, moved to New Zealand in 1850 and built another Ilam Hall. The farm/homestead that he created later grew and became the Ilam area of Christchurch. The site of the homestead was one of the main social centres of early Christchurch society. The present homestead was built in 1914 after a fire destroyed the first two buildings.

The Conservative politician Robert William Hanbury (1845–1903), lived and was buried there.

In 1934 Robert McDougall bought the hall and gave it to the National Trust to become a youth hostel and it is still run as such today. The grounds are open to the public and are a starting point for one of the prettiest river walks in the area.

== Church of the Holy Cross ==
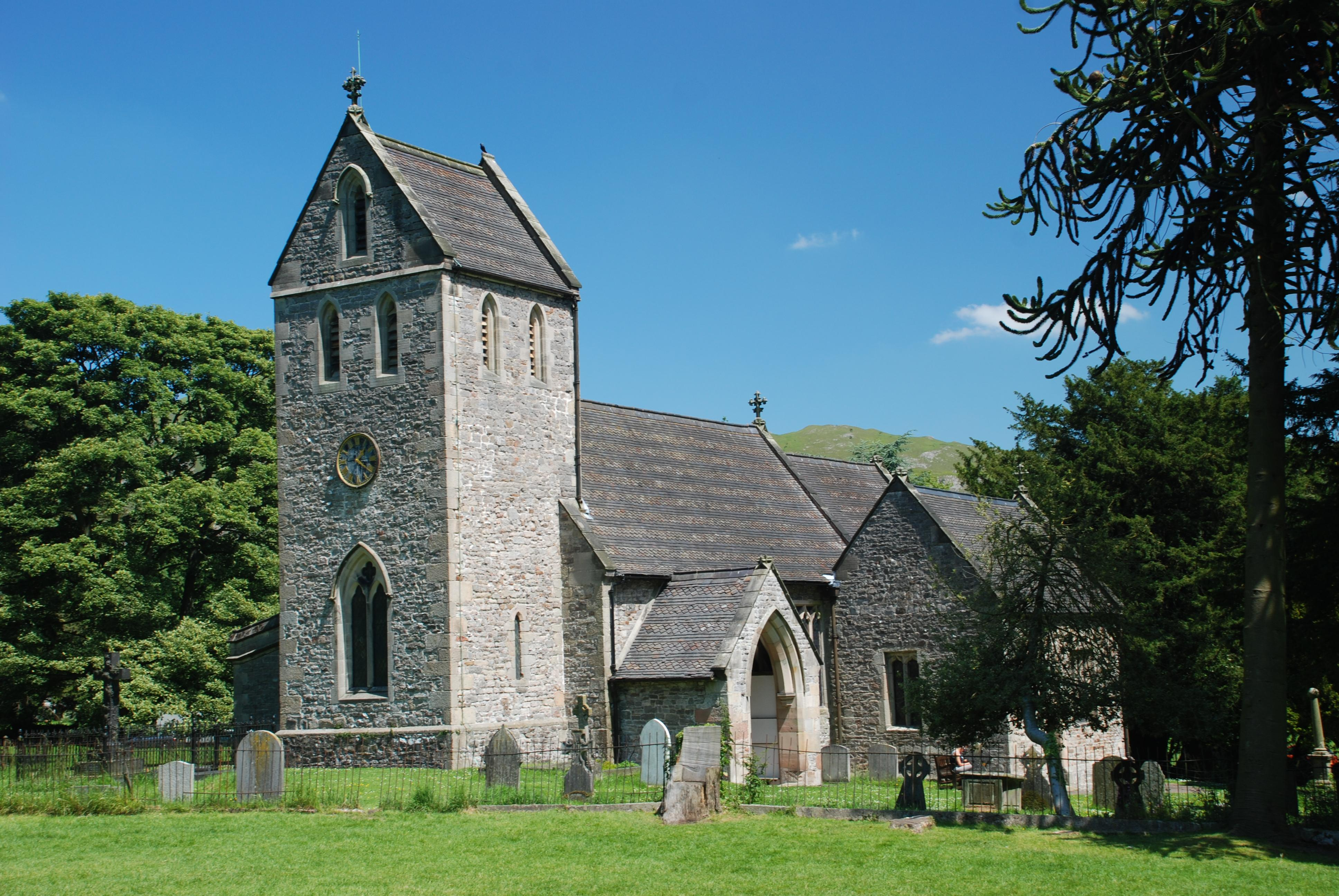
Church of the Holy Cross

Originally Anglo-Saxon, the church is now mainly 17th and 19th century following restoration in those two centuries.

Some of its origins can be seen in its carved stone Anglo-Saxon font, and in two stone cross shafts in the churchyard. Arthur Mee records that the church was restored in the 19th century by Sir Gilbert Scott, with three chapels, but "still has the 13th century base of its tower, and a wall of the same age. Its most ancient jewel is the wonderful font, so old that it is Saxon or Norman, the round bowl carved with humans and dragons." This font is thought to depict a scene from the legend of Saint Beorhthelm of Stafford.

It is in the Chapel of St Bertram, built in 1618 by the Meverell, Port and Hurt families, that the remains and shrine of the St Bertram (or Bertelin) can be found. St Bertram was an 8th-century son of a Mercian king who renounced his royal heritage for prayer and meditation after his wife and child were killed by wolves. He is said to have converted many to Christianity, and his shrine became a point of pilgrimage in the Middle Ages, it being reputed to be able to work miraculous cures. The chapel contains the Meverell Monument of two reclining figures, above is a memorial for their daughter.

In the David Pike Watts Memorial Chapel, built in 1831, is a large sculpture by Sir Francis Chantrey. The Memorial Window to Josephine Dora Granville is by Ward and Hughes (1884), depicting the presentation of Jesus in the Temple.

Wingfield Cromwell, 2nd Earl of Ardglass (1624 – 1668) is buried there.

== Dovedale House ==
The former vicarage, Dovedale House, is now run as a residential youth centre. Owned by the Church of England, it is under the management of the Diocese of Lichfield. It is a large old house near the entrance of Ilam Hall. It was opened as a residential centre in 1967.

== Village cross ==
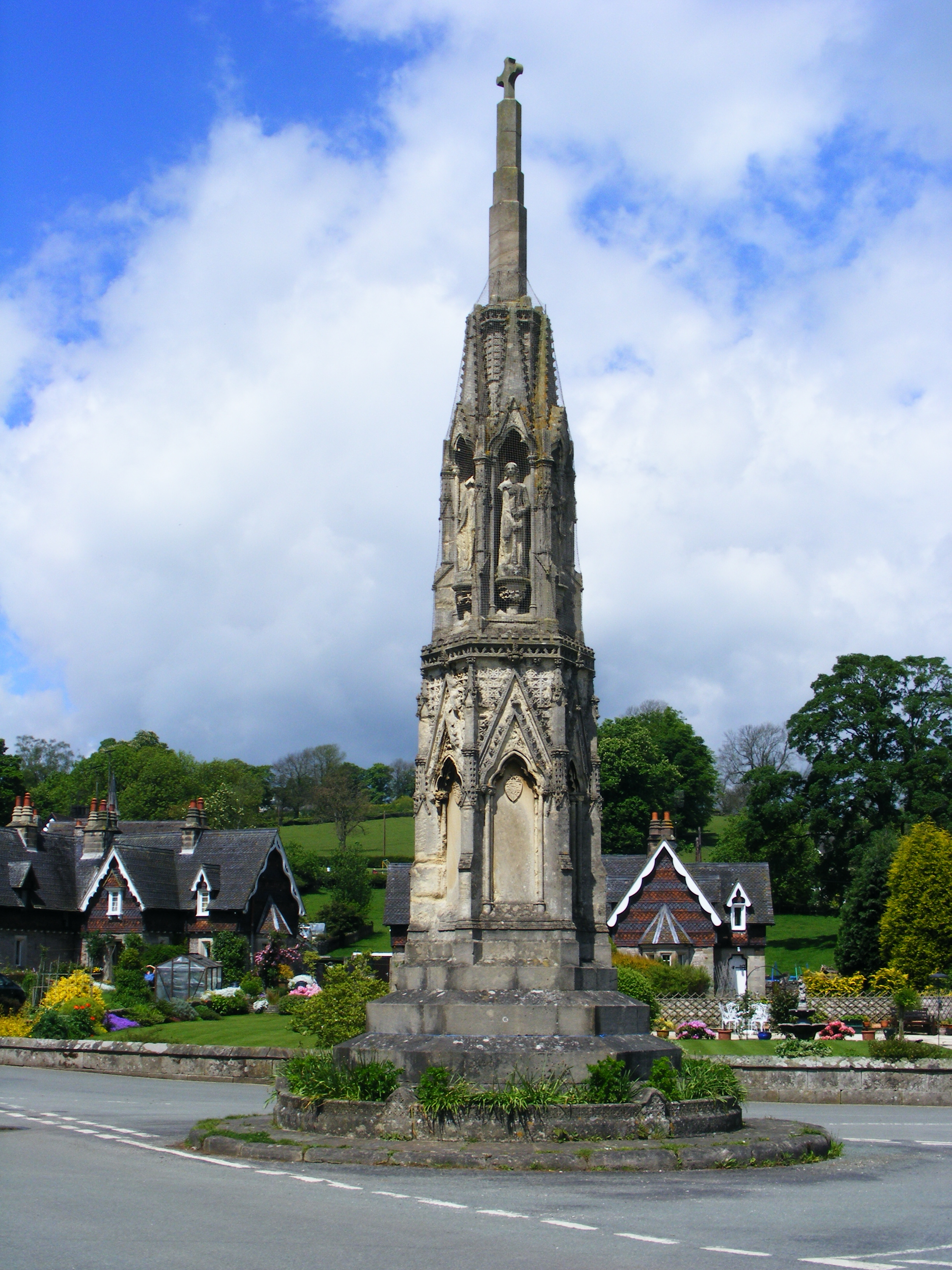
Ilam Cross

A conspicuous landmark is the Grade II* listed Mary Watts-Russell Memorial Cross; Mary was the wife of Jesse Watts-Russell. Standing as a roundabout at the road junction where a lane branches off towards Blore, this is an ornate gothic-style obelisk of local limestone in the style of an Eleanor Cross. Standing on a three-step plinth, it has two tiers of statues surmounted by a spire with a cross at the top. In style, it bears some resemblance to the decorated facade of Lichfield Cathedral.

A restoration was completed in 2011.

== Manifold Valley Agricultural Show ==
The Manifold Valley Agricultural Show has for a number of years been held within the parish. This show has usually been held on the second Saturday of August. The wide range of categories and activities provides a valuable social focus for this largely agricultural area. The venue is farmland owned by and above Casterne Hall just under a mile north of the village, on the plateau about halfway towards Stanshope. The road continues towards Wetton and Alstonefield.

== See also ==
- Listed buildings in Ilam, Staffordshire
- Staffordshire Moorlands Pan

== Additional photos ==
Given the condition of Ilam Cross before restoration, the following details of the faces are included for archive purposes.

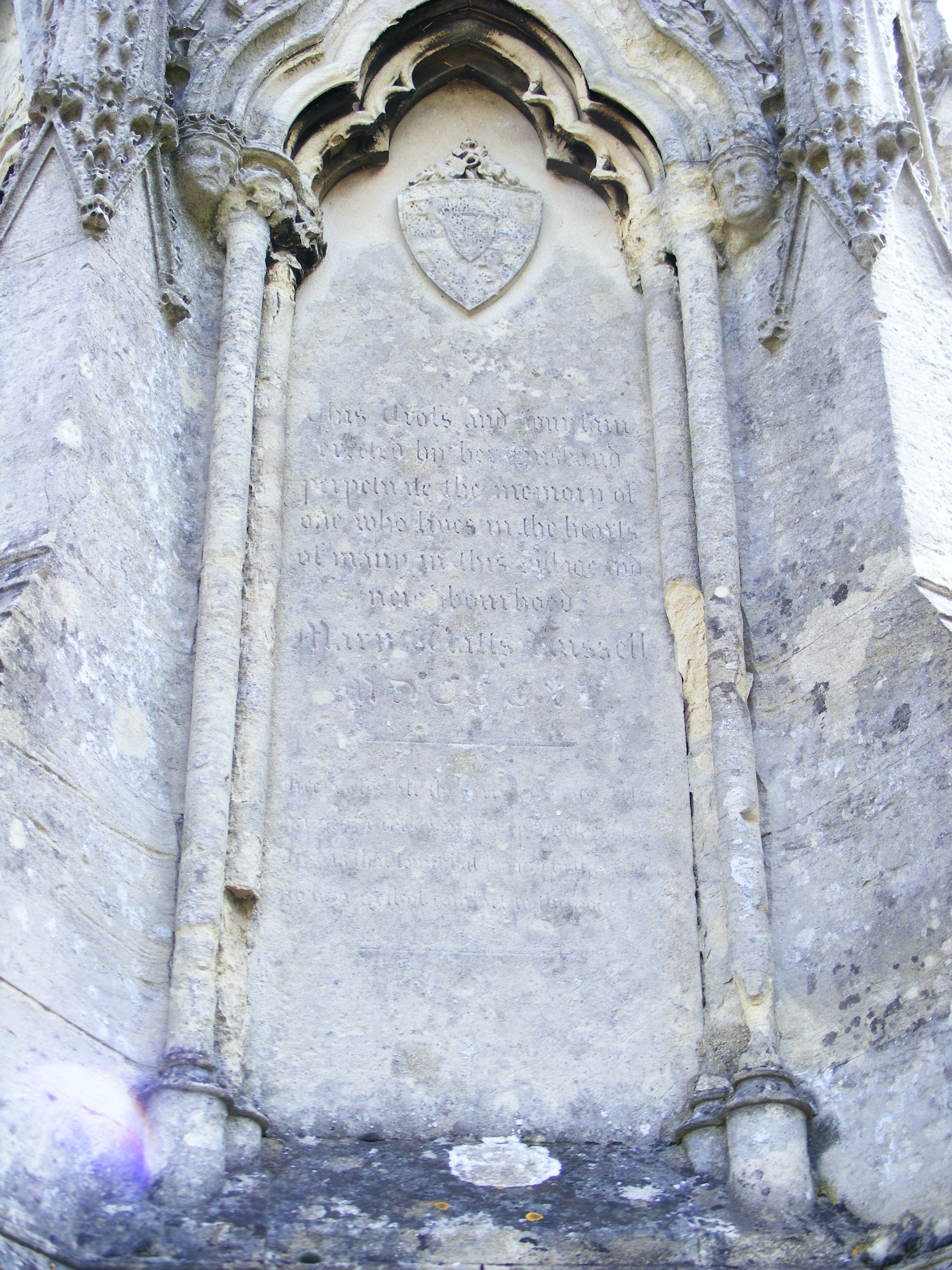
Face of Ilam Cross with main inscription

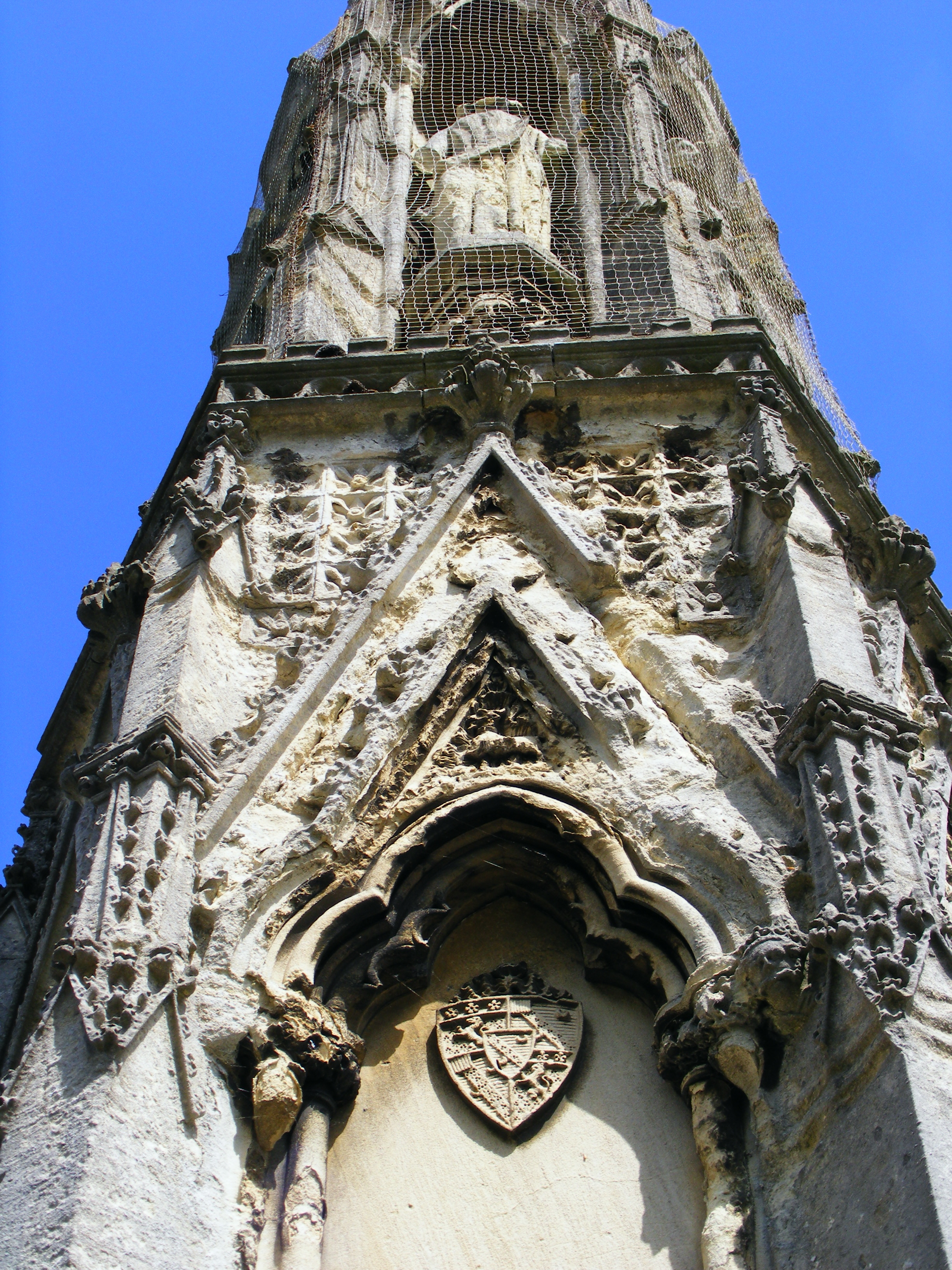
Face of Ilam Cross

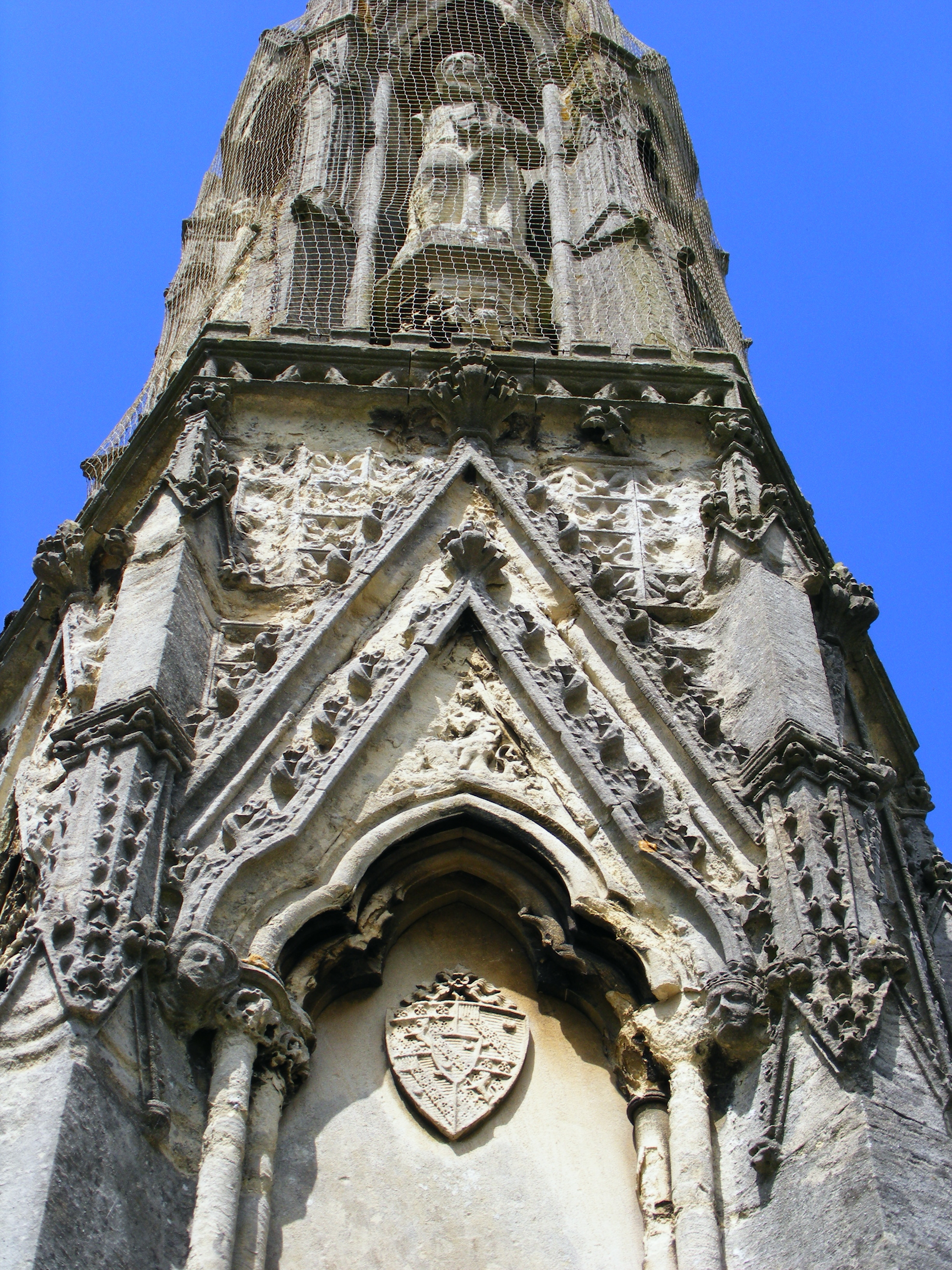
Face of Ilam Cross

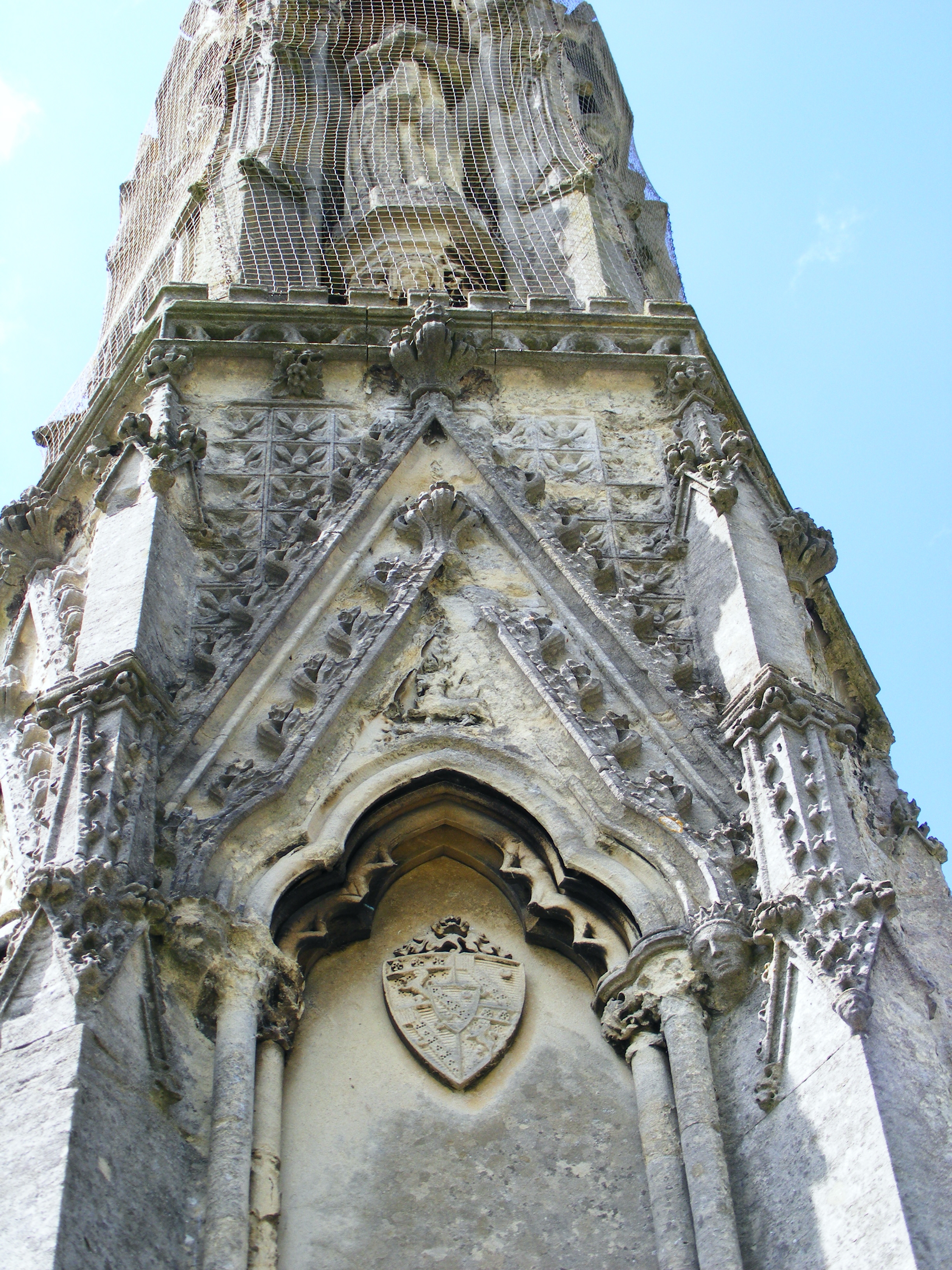
Face of Ilam Cross

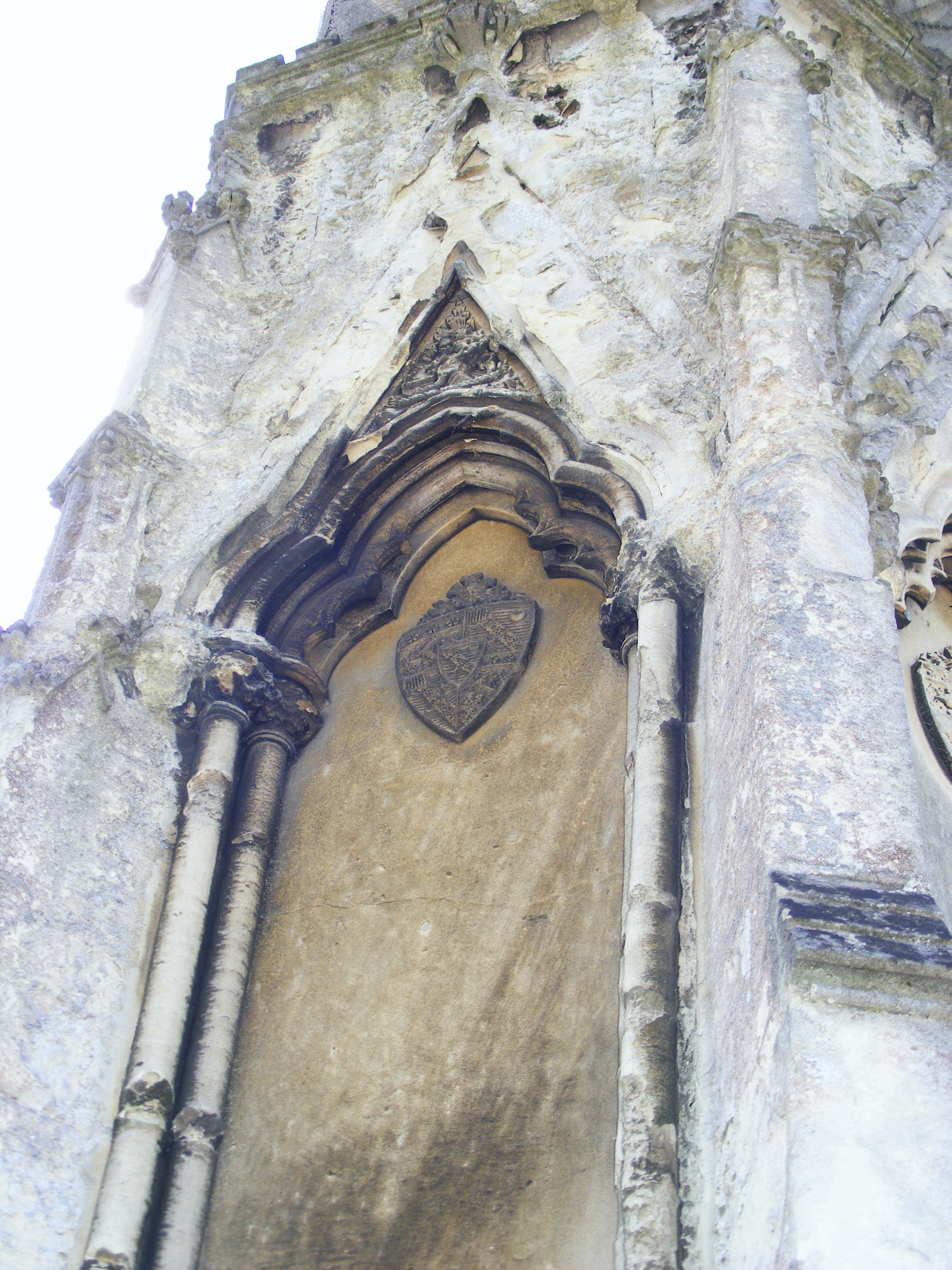
Face of Ilam Cross

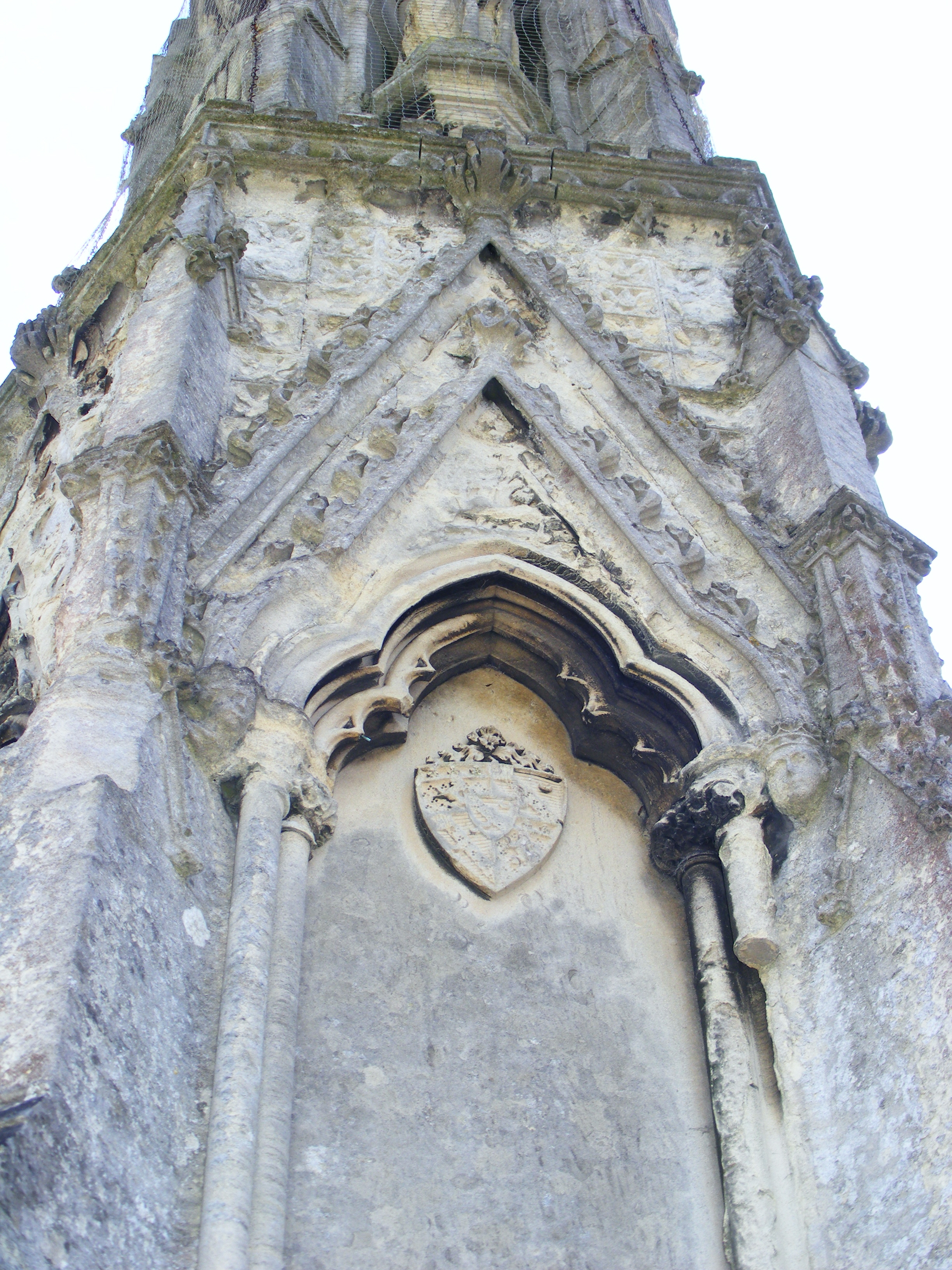
Face of Ilam Cross

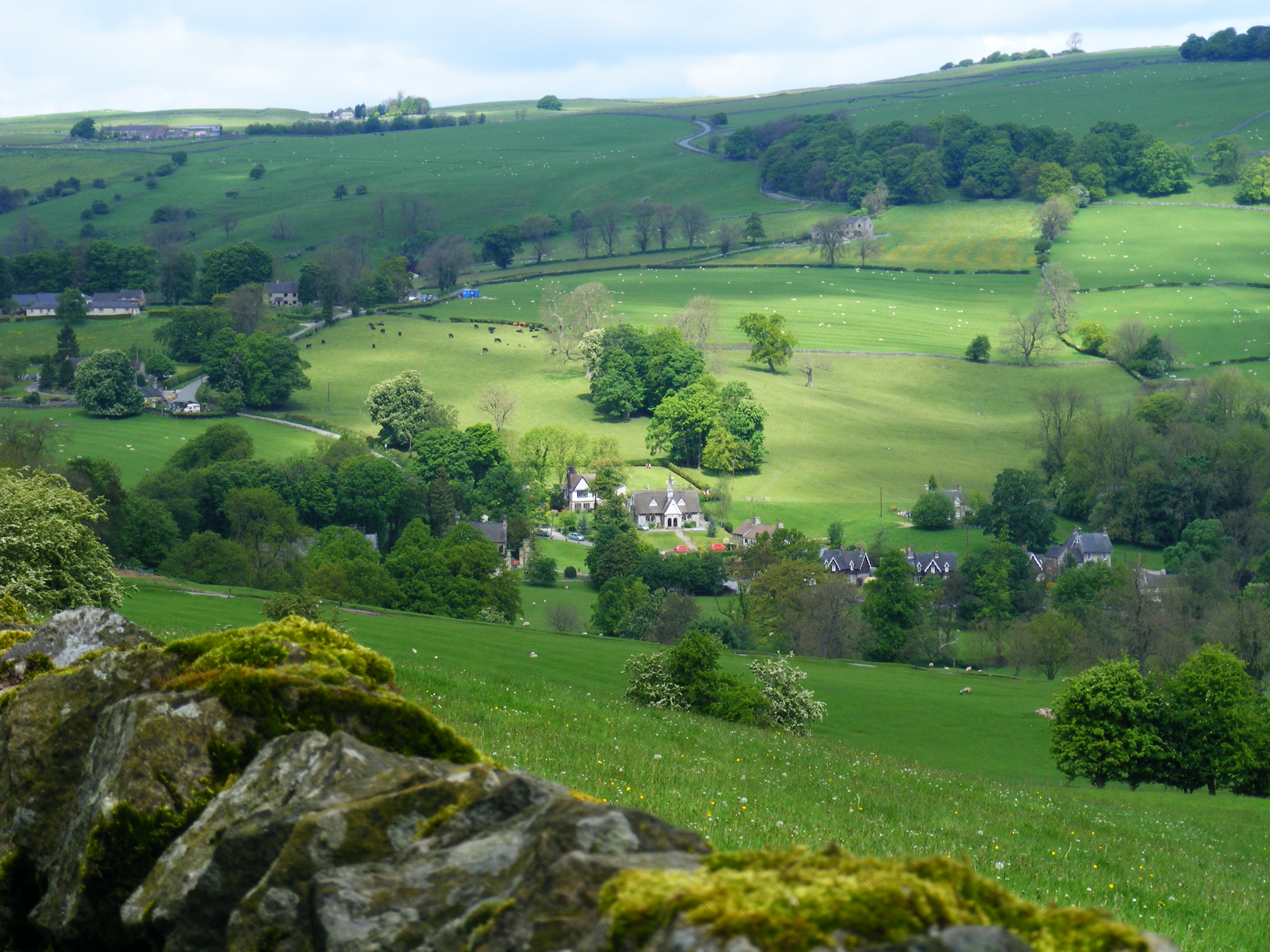
General view of Ilam from the south

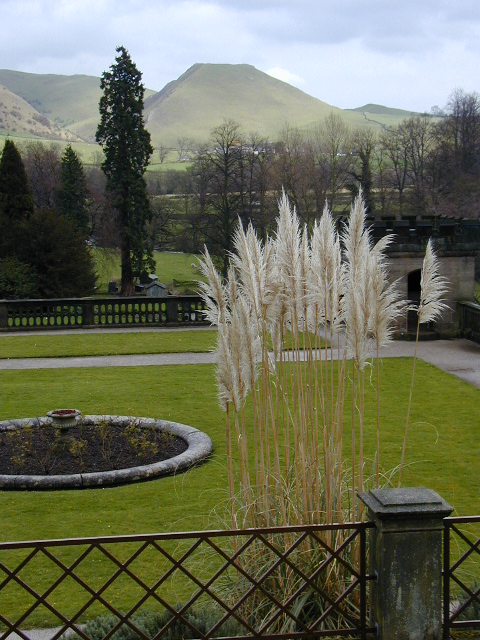
Ilam Hall gardens, looking towards Thorpe Cloud

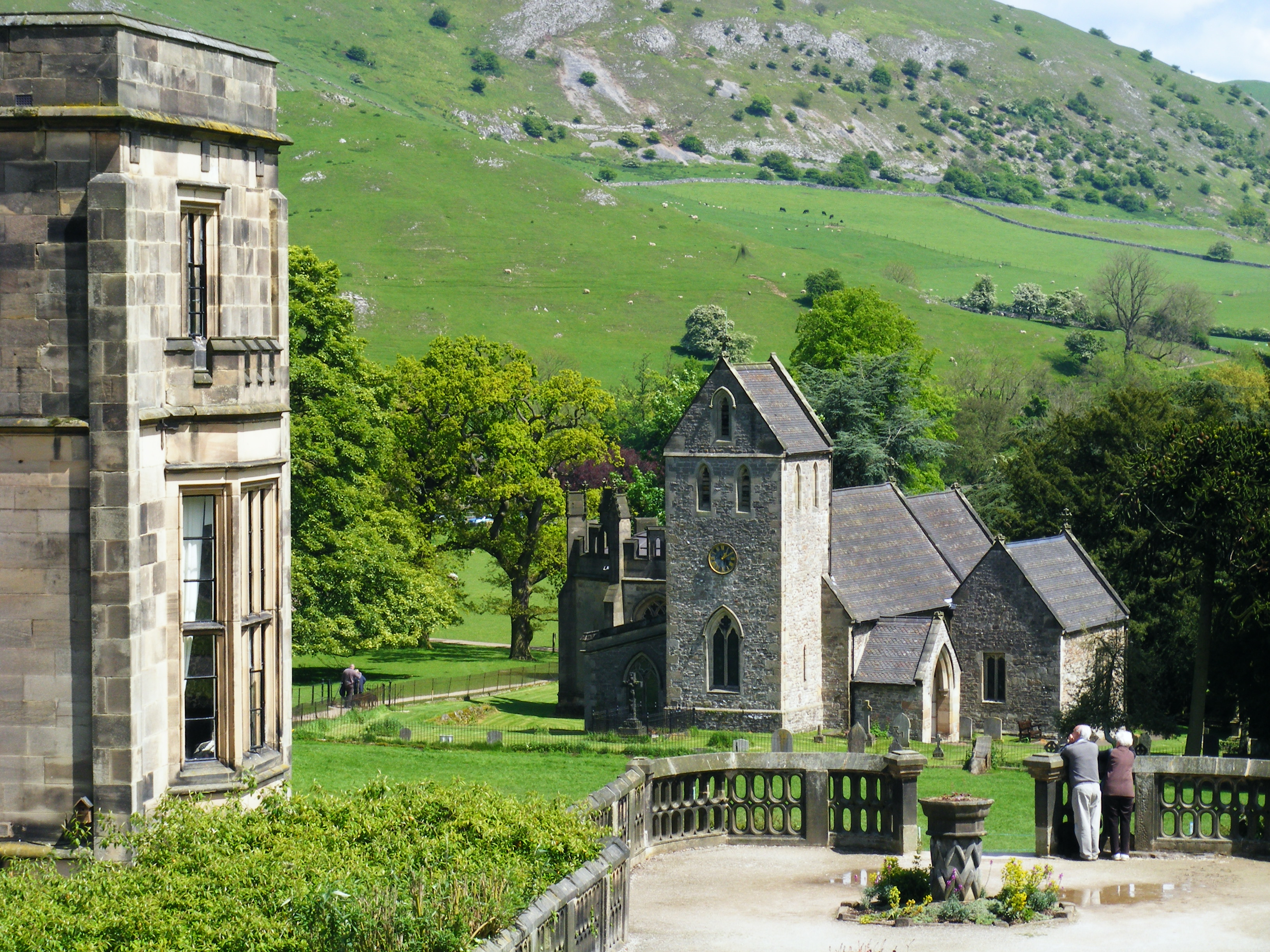
Ilam Church viewed from Ilam Hall
