= Sparrowlee railway station =

Disused railway station in Staffordshire, England

Sparrowlee
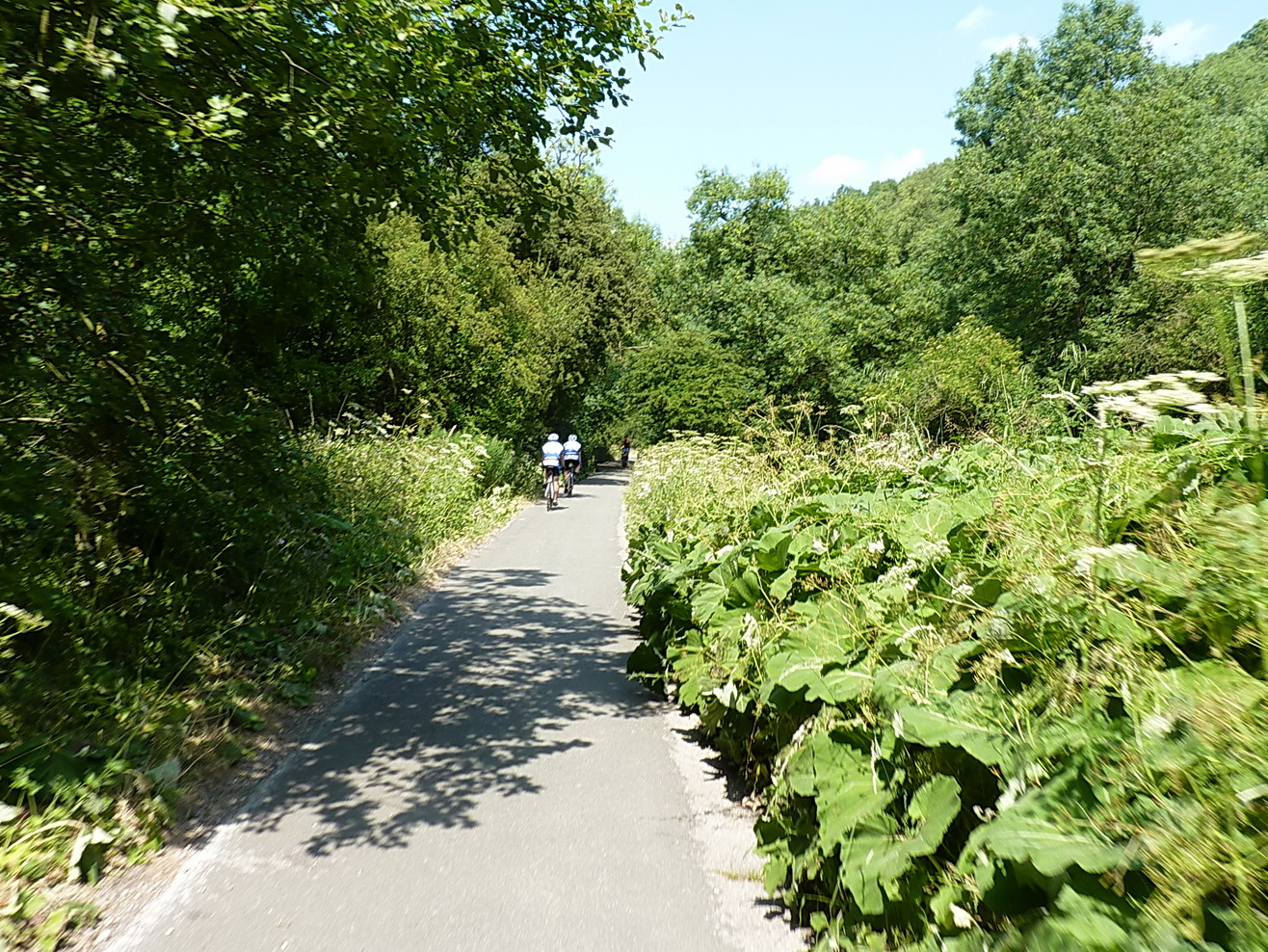
- The Manifold Way passing near Sparrowlee station

General information
- Location: Waterfall, Staffordshire Moorlands; England
- Coordinates: 53.0626°N 1.8607°W
- Platforms: 1

Other information
- Status: Disused

History
- Original company: Leek and Manifold Light Railway
- Post-grouping: London, Midland and Scottish Railway

Key dates
- 29 June 1904: Opened
- 12 March 1934: Closed
Location

Sparrowlee a railway station on the Leek and Manifold Valley Light Railway, a 2 ft 6 in (762 mm) narrow gauge line which ran for 8 miles between Hulme End and Waterhouses, in Staffordshire, and was initially operated by the North Staffordshire Railway before being taken over by the LMS. It served the village of Waterfall in Staffordshire, England.

The station was opened on 29 June 1904 and was the first halt when travelling north along the valley of the River Hamps between Waterhouses and Beeston Tor, the next station, and the start of the route along the River Manifold The station, which was simply a small halt with a grand sign, only in fact served Lee House Farm, for there was no such settlement of this name, and no other community to serve aside from Waterfall which was a distance away. A waiting room was consequently not provided, but a siding was provided for the farm's use, and this included a 60-foot standard gauge section, for the use of standard gauge wagons which were carried on special low transporter wagons.

The line closed in 1934, and the route of the railway past the station is now designated the Manifold Way, a walk- and cycle-path.

== Route ==
Preceding station	Historical railways	Following station
Waterhouses	Leek and Manifold Valley Light Railway	Beeston Tor
