= Butterton railway station =

Disused railway station in Butterton, Staffordshire

Butterton
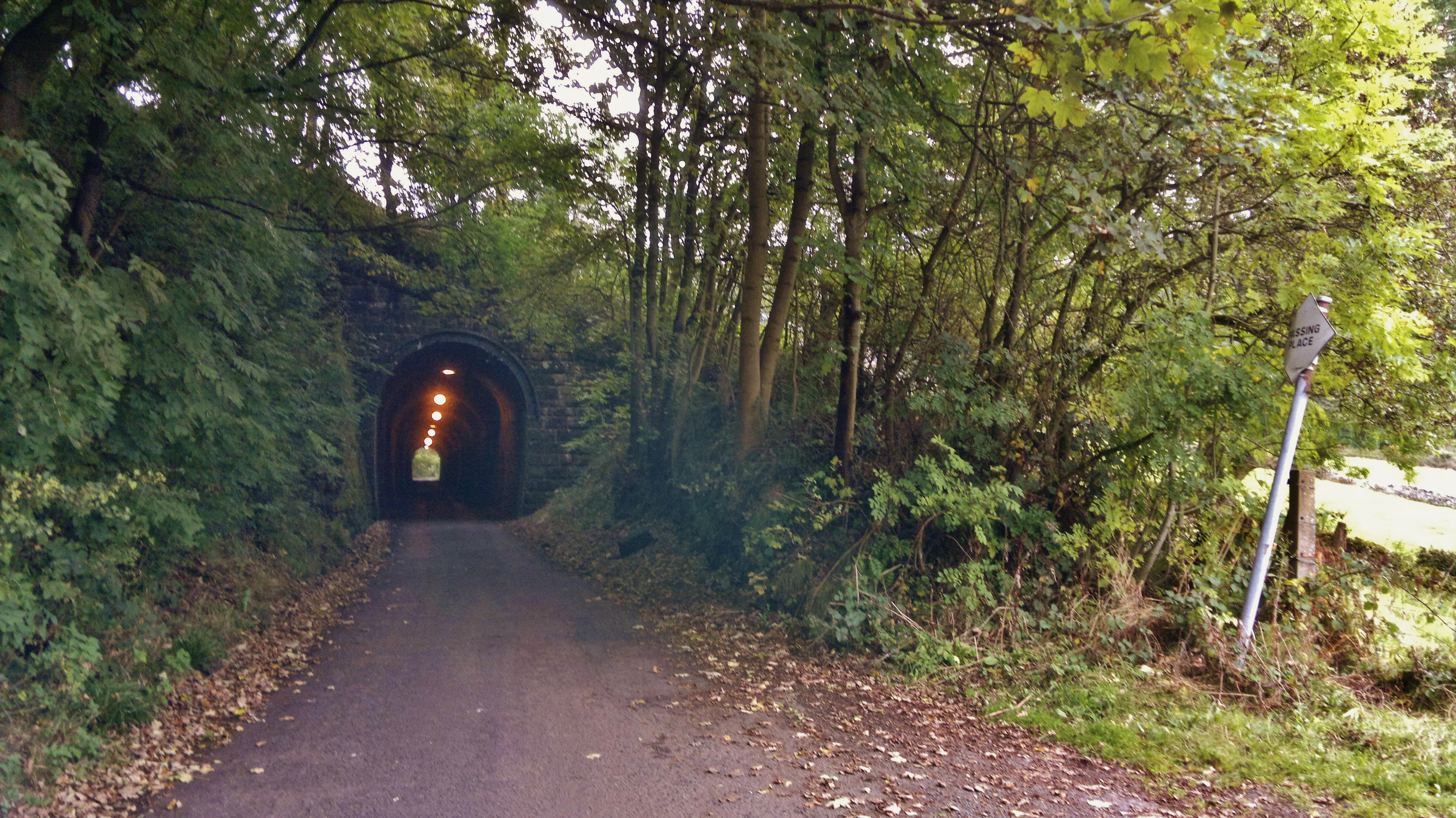
- The site of the station and the Swainsley Tunnel

General information
- Location: Butterton, Staffordshire Moorlands; England
- Coordinates: 53.1176°N 1.8653°W
- Platforms: 1

Other information
- Status: Disused

History
- Original company: Leek and Manifold Light Railway
- Post-grouping: London, Midland and Scottish Railway

Key dates
- 29 June 1904: Opened
- 12 March 1934: Closed
Location

Butterton railway station was a station on the Leek and Manifold Light Railway. It served the village of Butterton in Staffordshire, England. The site is now part of the Manifold Way including the Swainsley Tunnel.

== Route ==
Preceding station	Historical railways	Following station
Wetton Mill	Leek and Manifold Valley Light Railway	Ecton
