= Wetton, Staffordshire =

Village in Staffordshire, England

Coordinates: 53.096°N 1.838°W

Wetton
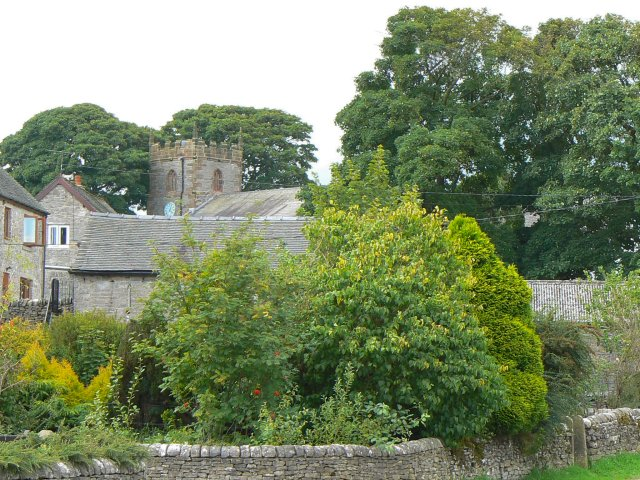
- Wetton village and church

- Location within Staffordshire
- OS grid reference: SK110555
- District: Staffordshire Moorlands
- Shire county: Staffordshire
- Region: West Midlands
- Country: England
- Sovereign state: United Kingdom
- Post town: Ashbourne
- Postcode district: DE6
- Dialling code: 01335
- Police: Staffordshire
- Fire: Staffordshire
- Ambulance: West Midlands
- UK Parliament: Staffordshire Moorlands

Wetton is a village in the Staffordshire Moorlands in Staffordshire, England. It is in the Peak District and at the top of the east side of the Manifold Valley. The population recorded in the 2001 Census was 157. At the time of the 2011 Census the population was recorded under Ilam. This article describes the location, some of the main features of the village, and a number of places of historical or general interest in or near the village. These include Long Low, Wetton, a prehistoric burial site unique to England.

Because the post town is Ashbourne, Derbyshire, many sources of tourist information wrongly describe Wetton as being in Derbyshire.

== Location ==
Wetton is a small village in the Staffordshire Peak District. It is about 2 miles west of Alstonfield and 8½ miles east of Leek. It stands high above the Manifold valley and contains mostly stone-built properties. The village has an inn, and a church, part of which dates back to the 14th century. The church is unusual in that it has an external staircase to its belfry.

== Wetton village ==
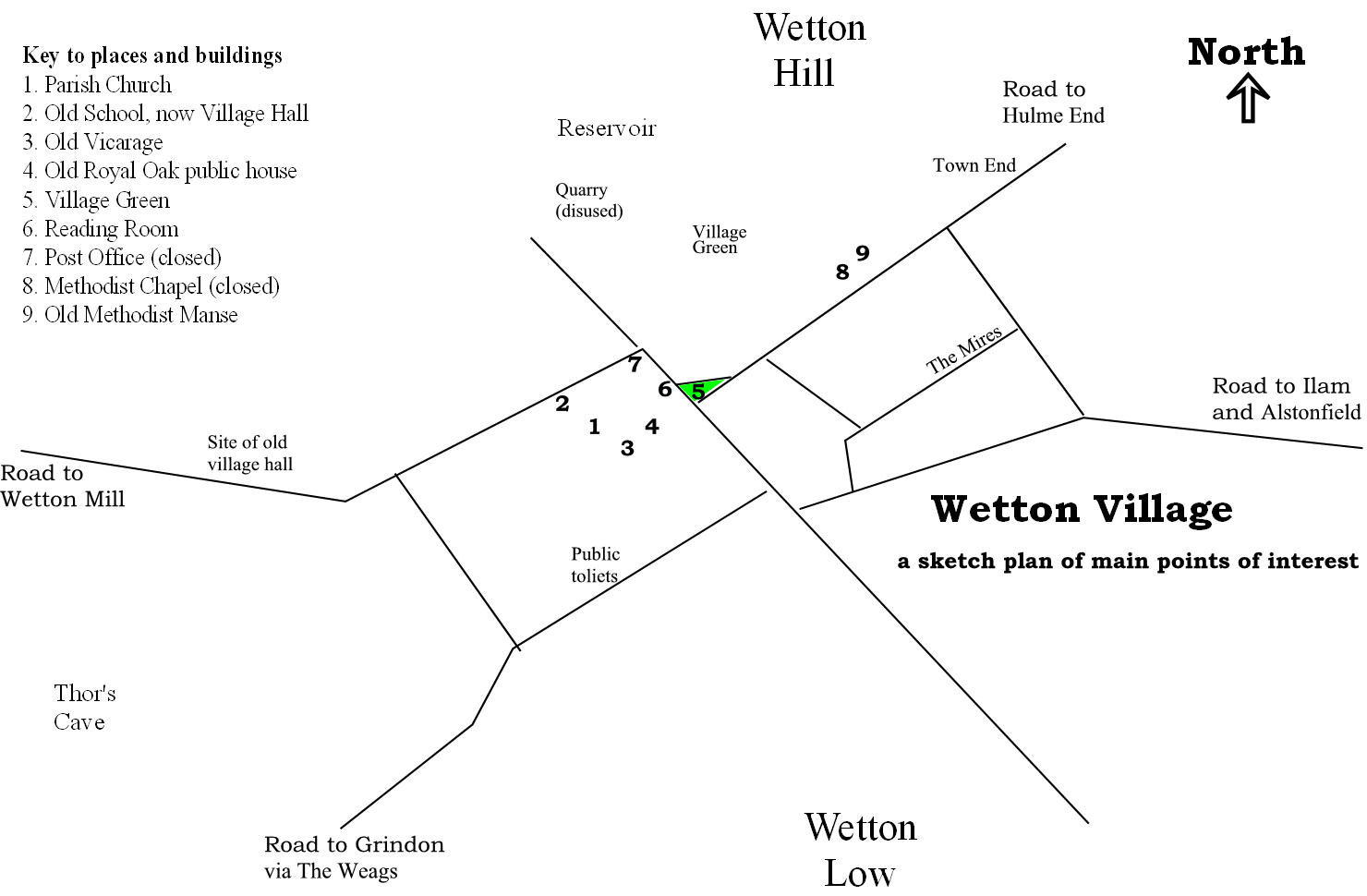
Sketch of Wetton Village with main features

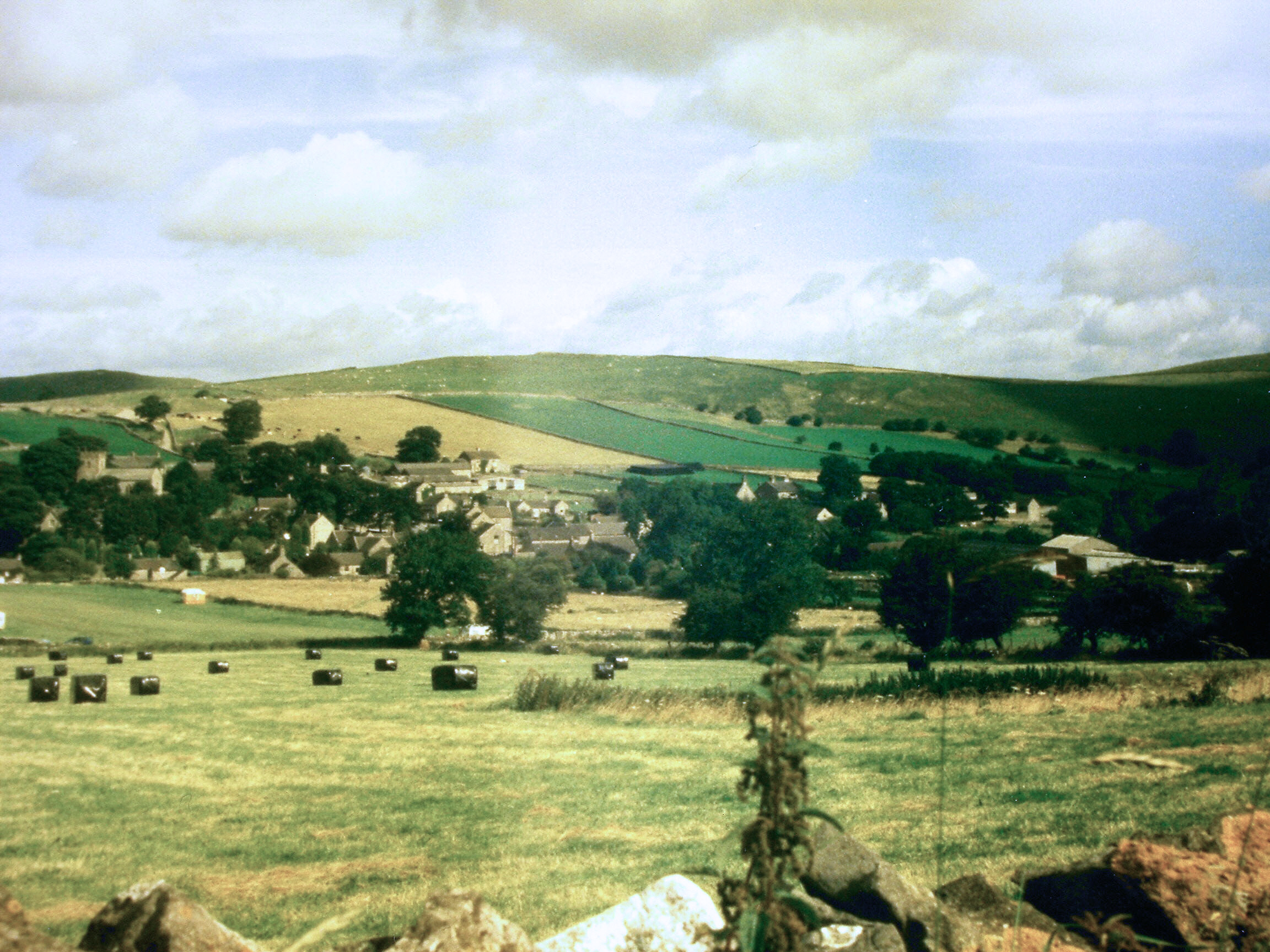
Wetton village viewed from Wetton Low with Wetton Hill in the background

Wetton village is primarily a collection of farmhouses, with the gaps filled in by cottages and a few larger houses. Towards the centre of the village are the village green, Ye Olde Royal Oak public house, the church, and the former vicarage.

The village gives its name to Wetton Mill (or Wettonmill), a nearby hamlet on the River Manifold, and Wetton Hill (grid reference SK104563), which are both in the care of the National Trust.

There are many burial chambers or mounds in the area, including those on Wetton Hill, at Wetton Low, 1 kilometre (0.62 mi) south of the village, and Long Low, 2 kilometres (1.2 mi) to the south-east.

=== St Margaret's Parish Church ===
(1) on sketch plan.

The parish Church of St Margaret is the most obvious public building in the village. It is now in the Benefice of Alstonefield, in the Diocese of Lichfield. The present building was rebuilt in 1820, but the tower dates from the 14th century.

=== Reading Room ===
(6) on sketch plan.

The Reading Room, by the churchyard gate opposite the village green, has not been used for many decades. This may have been the "Club House" referred to by Rev. J. B. Dyson in his 1853 history of Methodism in the Leek Circuit as an early venue for Methodist meetings.

=== School ===
(2) on sketch plan.

The village school closed because of falling pupil numbers. The building is now in use as the Village Hall and also houses a tea room. The old village hall, situated on the road to Wetton Mill, was a corrugated iron construction which was unusable by the 1960s. Children from Wetton now travel to Ilam or Warslow, along with those from nearby Alstonefield.

=== Methodist Chapel and Manse ===
(8) (9) on the sketch plan.

The former Chapel and Manse are next to Town End Farm, which is the last farm on the north-east of the village.

=== The Old Police House ===
The village police house, with its cell, is now a residential home. It is between the village green and the former Methodist Chapel. Staffordshire Police rented the property from the Duke of Devonshire from 1876 for use as a police station. The cell was added in 1889, and the station was closed in 1941. The Charge Book is held in Staffordshire records office and this indicates that between 1890 and 1941 some 28 persons were detained overnight for various alleged offences. The adjoining property is the former schoolmistress's house.

=== The Royal Oak ===
(4) on sketch plan.

The Royal Oak public house is famous for the annual toe wrestling competition. It is said that this sport began there in 1976, but was not raised to a championship event until 1993. For many years the event took place at the Bentley Brook Inn at Fenny Bentley near Ashbourne, Derbyshire, but it returned to Wetton in 2015.

== History ==
The various tumuli point to prehistoric Stone Age and Bronze Age settlements. Many local caves and cave-shelters have been excavated and have yielded evidence of inhabitation stretching far back into prehistory. For instance, items found in Thor's Cave, and now in the museum at Buxton, show evidence of early cave dwellers at the site.

Wetton is not recorded in the Norman Domesday Book of 1086, unlike neighbouring Alstonefield, Warslow and Stanshope. The earliest reference is to Wetindona in a document from the late 12th century. The name may derive from Old English meaning 'wet hill'.

The English Heritage listing document for Wetton church has: "Early 14th century [tower, on which] ... gargoyles at belfry stage ... parapet band with gargoyles".

The remains of an Anglo-Saxon settlement, with earlier evidence of Roman occupation, were found in nearby Borough Fields by the geologist Samuel Carrington in the mid-18th century, and excavated by his friend Thomas Bateman who was then the leading local antiquary. A full account of their excavations was given in Bateman's book Ten years’ diggings (1861). Carrington and Bateman were enshrined in literature some years later as the leading characters "Hornblower" and "Flaxdale" in Eliza Meteyard's novel Dora and her Papa (1869), by which time Carrington was the Schoolmaster and Parish Clerk at Wetton.

=== Industry ===
With the advent of the Mill at Wetton Mill, there was a surge in corn-growing along the valley tops. The number of disused lead mines in the area point to a range of other industries from around the 16th and 17th centuries.

In the late Victorian period the most significant heavy industry was related to the construction of the Leek and Manifold Light Railway and mining at Ecton.

=== Methodism ===
When the Wetton and Longnor Wesleyan Methodist Circuit was formed in 1870, Wetton was chosen for the Manse. In 1932, the Circuit incorporated various Primitive Methodist Chapels. The Circuit was disbanded in 1969. The first Wesleyan Methodist building was opened in 1828. The Primitive Methodists held meetings in Wetton, but did not establish a Chapel there. However, the Methodist Chapel at Ecton was Primitive Methodist, resulting from the industrial mission work from Ramsor and later the Leek Primitive Methodist Circuit. After the completion of the railway in 1904, a building at Ecton became the Methodist Chapel there.

== Places of interest ==
There are a number of places of interest within the parish.

=== Manifold Valley ===
The main tourist destination is the Manifold Valley. Several places may be noted (starting upstream).

==== Ecton ====
At the northern end of Wetton parish, Ecton is most famous for the copper mine.

==== Swainsley ====
A little downstream from Ecton, this is the site of the only tunnel on the former railway. This was built because one of the owners of the railway lived there and did not want to be disturbed by passing trains.

==== Wetton Mill ====
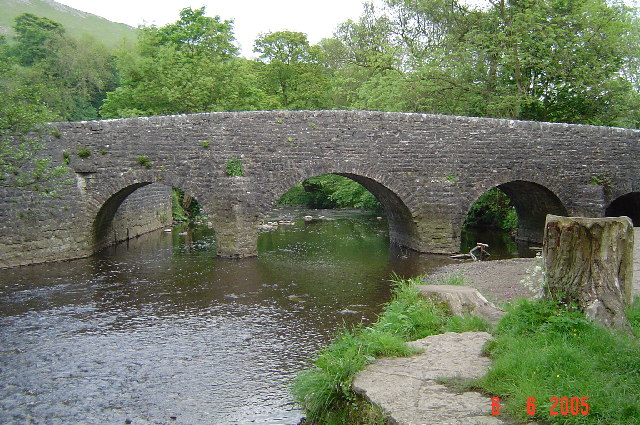
The bridge over the river Manifold at Wetton Mill

Wetton Mill was a watermill for grinding corn, and the remains of a millstream, along with a grindstone, may still be seen. The mill is long since disused, but the tea room is popular with tourists. There is ample parking by the mill, on the site of the old halt, and the café is a popular stopping point for walkers using the Manifold Way and the many other rural walks that can incorporate parts of it. Immediately downstream from the mill are several "swallow holes" where the River Manifold begins to flow underground to Ilam.

The conclusion of the 14th-century chivalric romantic poem Sir Gawain and the Green Knight is thought to be set in the district. This is partly because the dialect in which the poem is written is now accepted by scholars as closely resembling that of the district, and also partly due to the extensive local work of R. W. V. Elliot in the 1970s. This has led some to try to identify precisely the actual location of the story's climax. Mabel Day (1940) proposed Nan Tor Cave, "at the bottom of the valley where the Hoo Brook runs into the Manifold at Wetton Mill" (near the site of the Wetton Mill train station), as a candidate for the Green Chapel. Her idea was later examined in detail by Robert Kaske (1972).

==== Thor's Cave ====
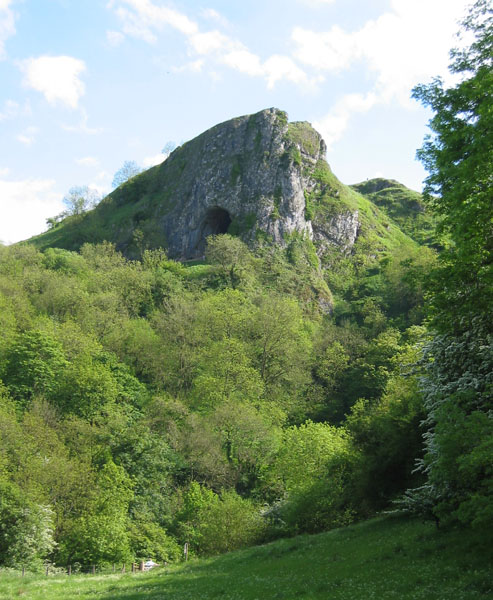
Thor's Cave

Thor's Cave is a prominent landmark, both in the valley and for some distance around. The cave is clearly visible from the moorland above Warslow. The main cave is near the top of a cliff overlooking the river; at the base of the cliff are a number of small caves only just above river level, which may be reached when the river bed is dry.

==== The Weags ====
The bridge where the road from Wetton to Grindon crosses the river is known as Weags Bridge. The valley sides are steep at this point, and the road has hairpin bends on both sides. As with much of the Manifold valley, the road is unsuitable for coaches.

==== Beeston Tor ====
Beeston Tor is a prominent rock face opposite the confluence of the River Hamps. This is popular with rock climbers.

==== Leek and Manifold Light Railway ====
Wetton was served by three railway stations at Thor's Cave, Redhurst Crossing and Wetton Mill which were opened by the narrow gauge (2' 6") Leek and Manifold Valley Light Railway on 27 June 1904, whilst being entirely operated by the North Staffordshire Railway. The main purposes of the railway were to provide (1) more rapid transport for milk and dairy products from farms around the valley to customers in Leek and The Potteries, and (2) easier transport for the copper being mined at Ecton.

The village of Wetton was a good mile from the station, and the fact that the line followed the valley bottom whereas the settlements served by the railway were mostly on the hill-tops above was a contributary factor in its demise. The line closed in 1934, but in 1937 the route was reopened as the Manifold Way, a fully tarmacked 8-mile walk- and cycle-path which runs from Hulme End in the north to Waterhouses in the south.

=== Hills and other features ===
==== Wetton Hill ====
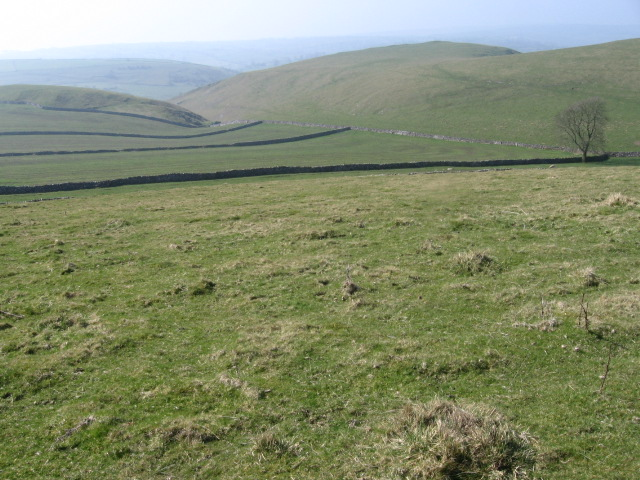
View near Wetton Hill

With a peak at 1221 feet above sea level, Wetton Hill is a prominent landmark. Views from the summit include Rugeley power station, some 25 miles south (now demolished).

==== Wetton Low ====
Wetton Low is another peak, almost due south of the village. The name Low comes from its use as a burial ground, with several tumuli. There are also a number of disused lead mines in this area, some in the form of adits. At one time a wooded area of the valley side near the Low was designated as a nature reserve.

==== Long Low ====
Long Low is a Neolithic and Bronze Age burial site of a rare form, unique to Britain. It is about a mile south east of the village, with Wetton Low about mid-way from Long Low to the village.

== See also ==
- Listed buildings in Wetton, Staffordshire

== Notes ==
1. The Wetton page of the Discover Derbyshire, Peak District web site (apparently claiming parts of Staffordshire as being across the border) has a very useful description of the village.
