= Swainsley Tunnel =

Railway tunnel in Staffordshire, England

Coordinates: 53.116°N 1.866°W

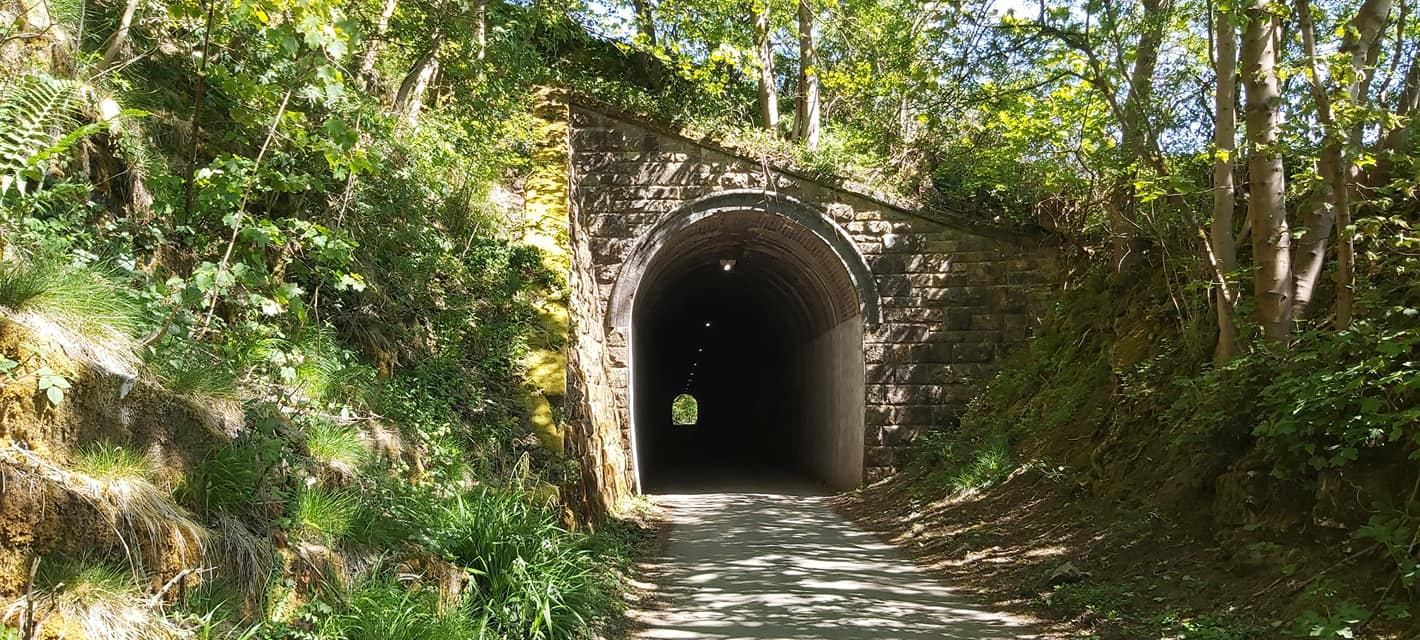
- The southern entrance to the tunnel
- Interactive map of Swainsley Tunnel

Overview
- Status: Open

Operation
- Opened: 1904
- Closed: 1934 (as railway tunnel)
- Traffic: Automotive/cyclists/pedestrians

Technical
- Length: 150 m (490 ft)

Swainsley Tunnel is a tunnel on the route of the former Leek and Manifold Light Railway, which connected the market town of Leek with Hulme End, via Waterhouses, in Staffordshire, England. It was in use as a railway tunnel between 1904 and 1934. It now forms part of the Manifold Way trail.

== History ==
Swainsley Tunnel is between Ecton and Butterton. It opened in 1904 as part of the line of the Leek and Manifold Light Railway. It was built at the insistence of Sir Thomas Wardle, a director of the L&MLR and owner of the nearby Swainsley Hall, who did not want the line to spoil the view from his house. The tunnel is 164 yards (150 m) long. Its bore is large for a narrow-gauge railway and was designed to cater for standard-gauge conveyances atop narrow-gauge wagons. The line closed in 1934 and the tunnel fell into disuse.

The trackbed was gifted to Staffordshire County Council and reopened in 1937 as a walking and cycling trail, the Manifold Way. Staffordshire Council allowed motor vehicles to use the tunnel from 1951, and it remains a shared bicycle, automobile and pedestrian tunnel on the trail. Because of its narrow width, there are enforced regulations on car users and a weight limit of three tons. The tunnel is a popular site for illegal street racing by both motorcyclists and motorists; Staffordshire Police have made the tunnel subject to a Section 59 Notice, which allows them to seize vehicles if drivers are found to be driving through in an unsafe or aggressive manner.
