= Bank barrow =

Type of tumulus

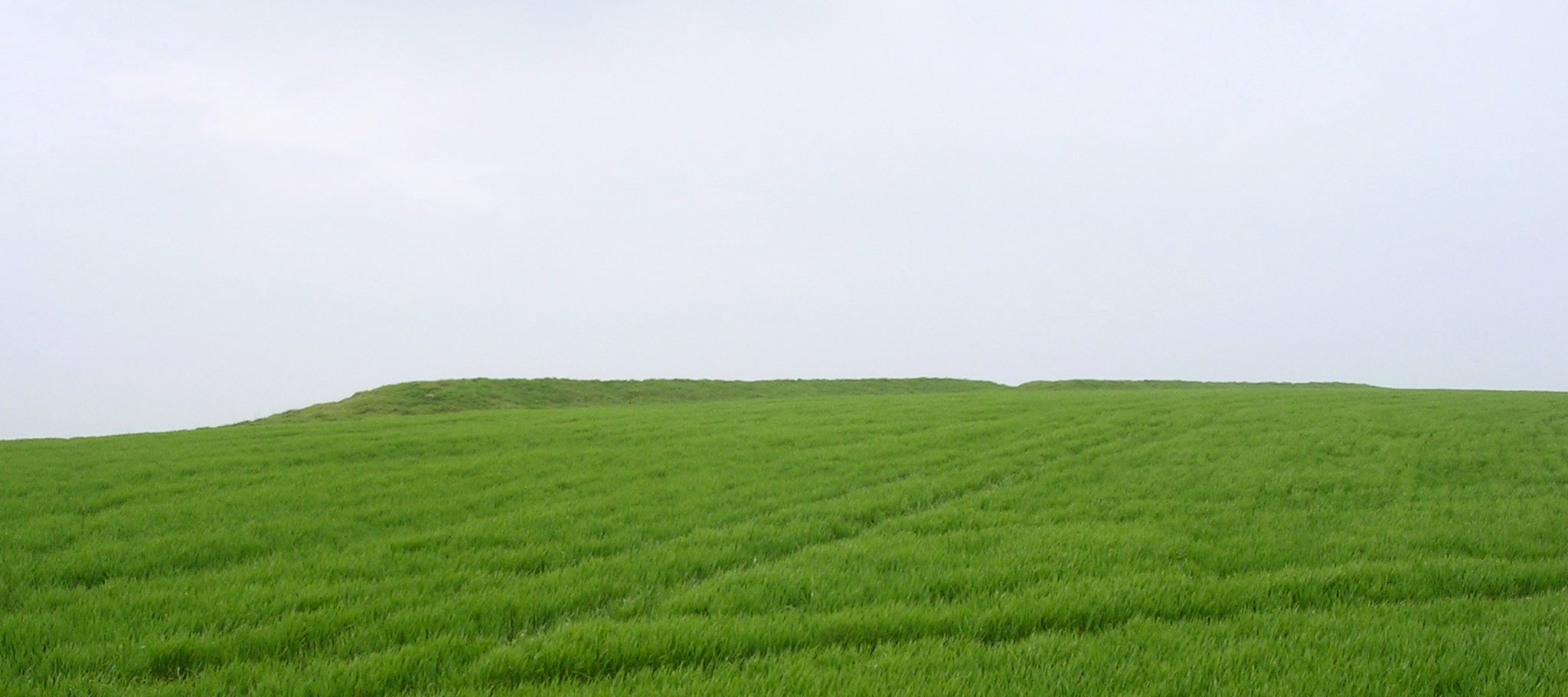
Long Bredy bank barrow on Martin's Down, Dorset, U.K.

A bank barrow, sometimes referred to as a barrow-bank, ridge barrow, or ridge mound, is a type of tumulus first identified by O.G.S. Crawford in 1938.

In the United Kingdom, these take the form of a long, sinuous, parallel-sided mound, approximately uniform in height and width along its length, and usually flanked by ditches on either side. They may be the result of a single phase of construction, or be the result of the addition of one or more linear extensions to the bank of a pre-existing barrow. Although burials have been found within the mound, no burial chambers as such have been identified in bank barrows. These ancient monuments are of middle Neolithic date.

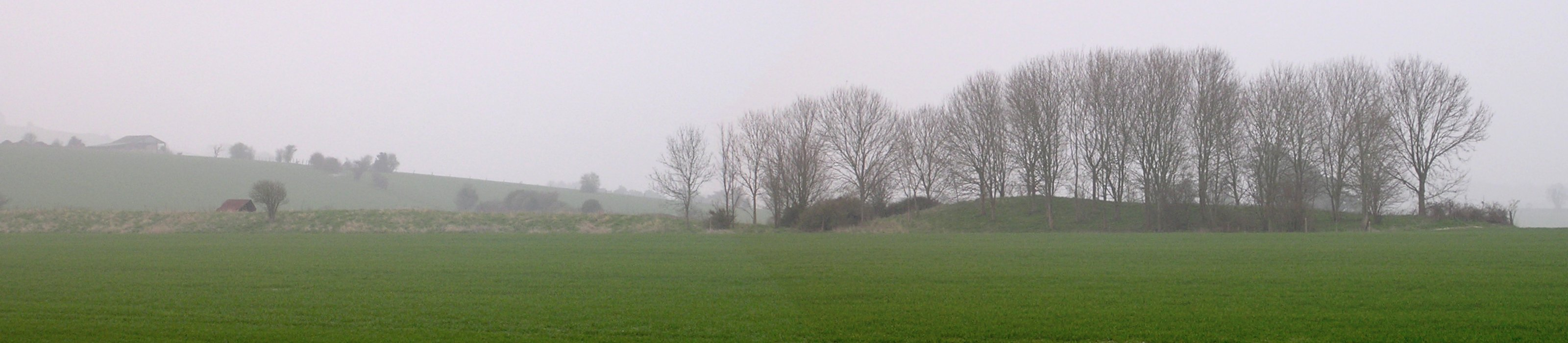
A possible bank barrow near Pentridge in Dorset, U.K. The barrow comprises two distinct parts: the taller narrower part (tree-covered) to the north-east and the wider flatter part (grass-covered) to the south-west. These parts are 50m and 90m long, respectively. Although they have been considered to be two cojoined long barrows, probing and aerial photography has revealed them to have a common continuous ditch (now ploughed out). Another suggestion is that the western part is a classic long barrow, with the eastern part as a tail that was added later.

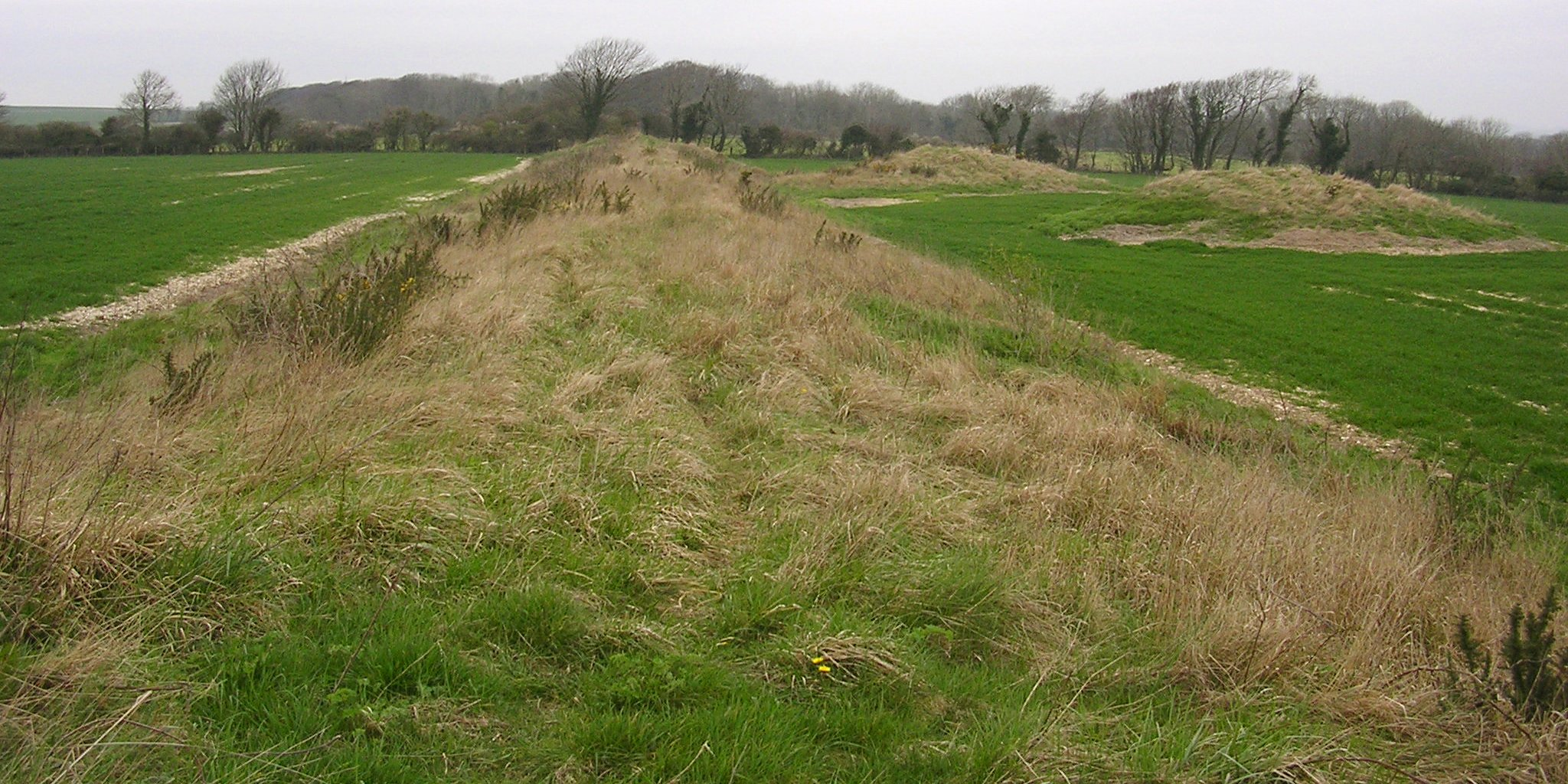
A view along the 180 metre-long Broadmayne bank barrow in Dorset, U.K.

Fewer than ten bank barrows remain in the United Kingdom. Examples may be found at

- Maiden Castle, Broadmayne and Martin's Down in Dorset; and
- Long Low near Wetton in Staffordshire.

== References and further reading ==
- Ashbee, Paul (1984). The Earthen Long Barrow in Britain: An Introduction to the Study of the Funerary Practice and Culture of the Neolithic People of the Third Millennium B.C. Geo Books. ISBN 0-86094-170-1.
- Sharples, Niall M (1991). English Heritage Book of Maiden Castle. B. T. Batsford Ltd. ISBN 0-7134-6083-0.
