= Wetton Mill railway station =

Disused railway station in Staffordshire, England

Wetton Mill
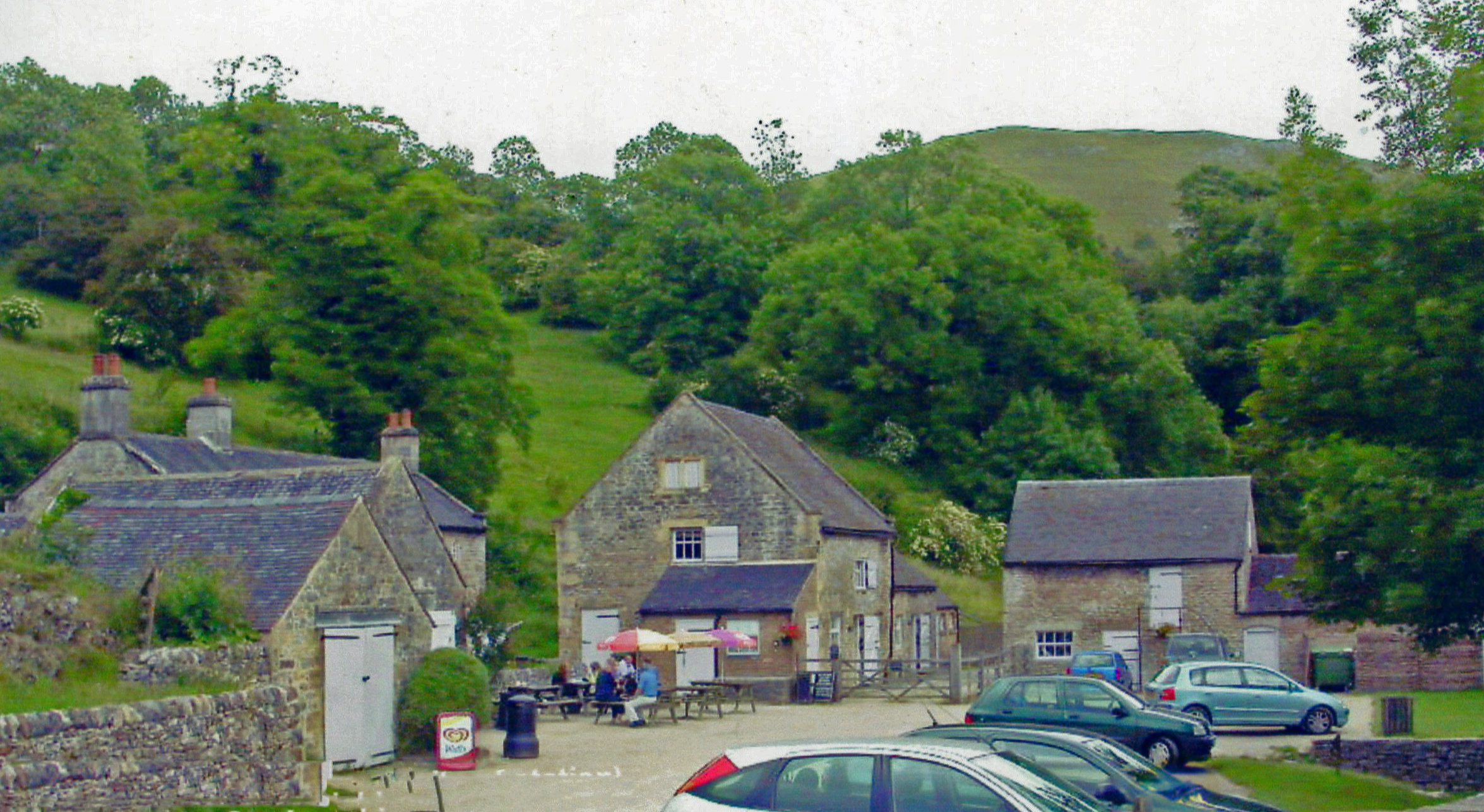
- Site of the former station

General information
- Location: Wetton, Staffordshire Moorlands; England
- Coordinates: 53.1018°N 1.8600°W
- Platforms: 1

Other information
- Status: Disused

History
- Original company: Leek and Manifold Light Railway
- Post-grouping: London, Midland and Scottish Railway

Key dates
- 29 June 1904: Opened
- 12 March 1934: Closed
Location

Wetton Mill was a railway station on the Leek and Manifold Light Railway serving the nearby Wetton Mill in Wetton, Staffordshire. It was in operation from 1904 to 1934. A painting of the station dating from 1905 by the railway artist C. Hamilton Ellis is now held by the National Railway Museum at York. The site now forms part of the Manifold Way.

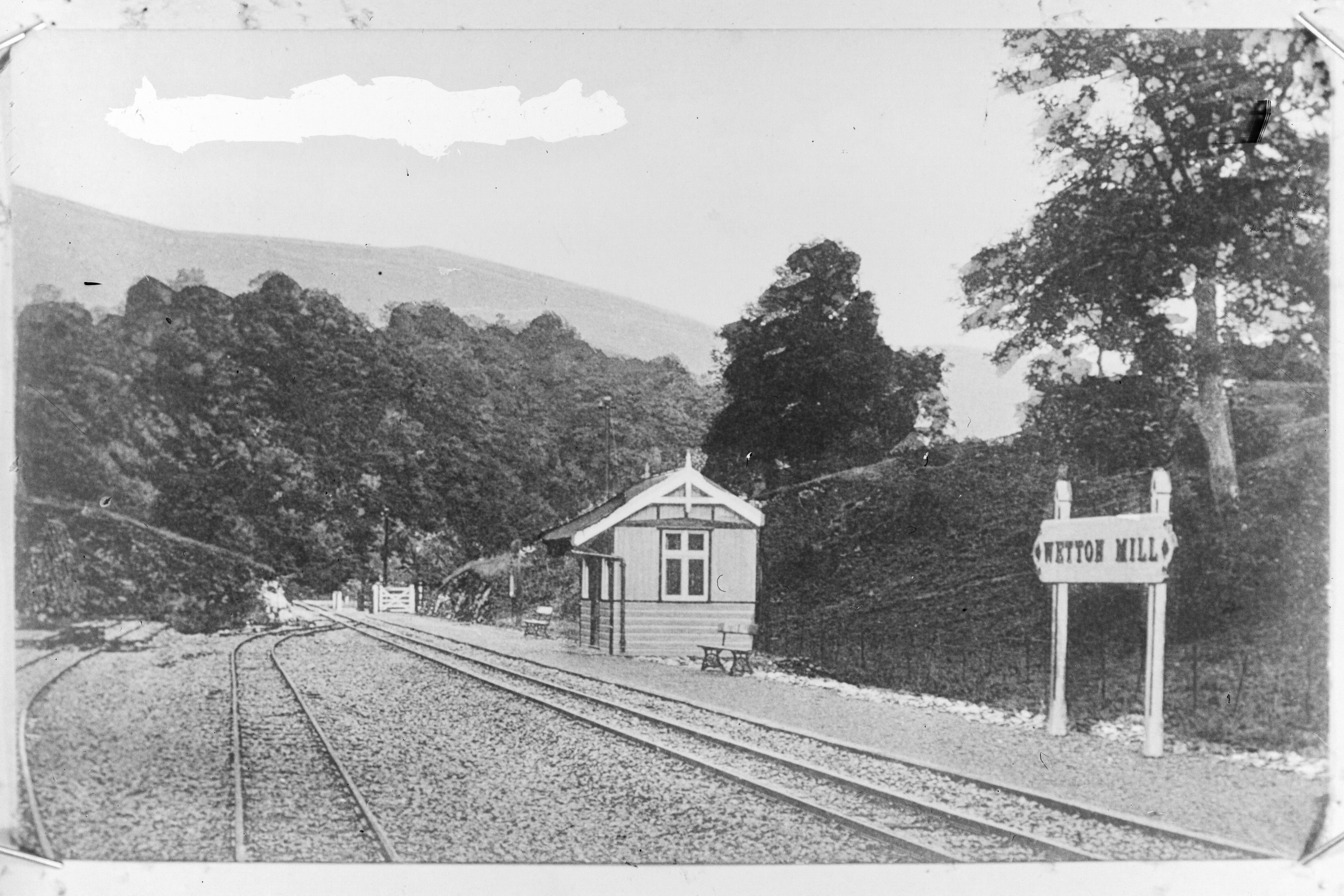
Wetton Mill station part of the old Manifold Way railway line circa 1910

== Route ==
Preceding station	Historical railways	Following station
Redhurst Crossing	Leek and Manifold Valley Light Railway	Butterton
