= Ecton railway station =

Disused railway station in Staffordshire, England

Ecton
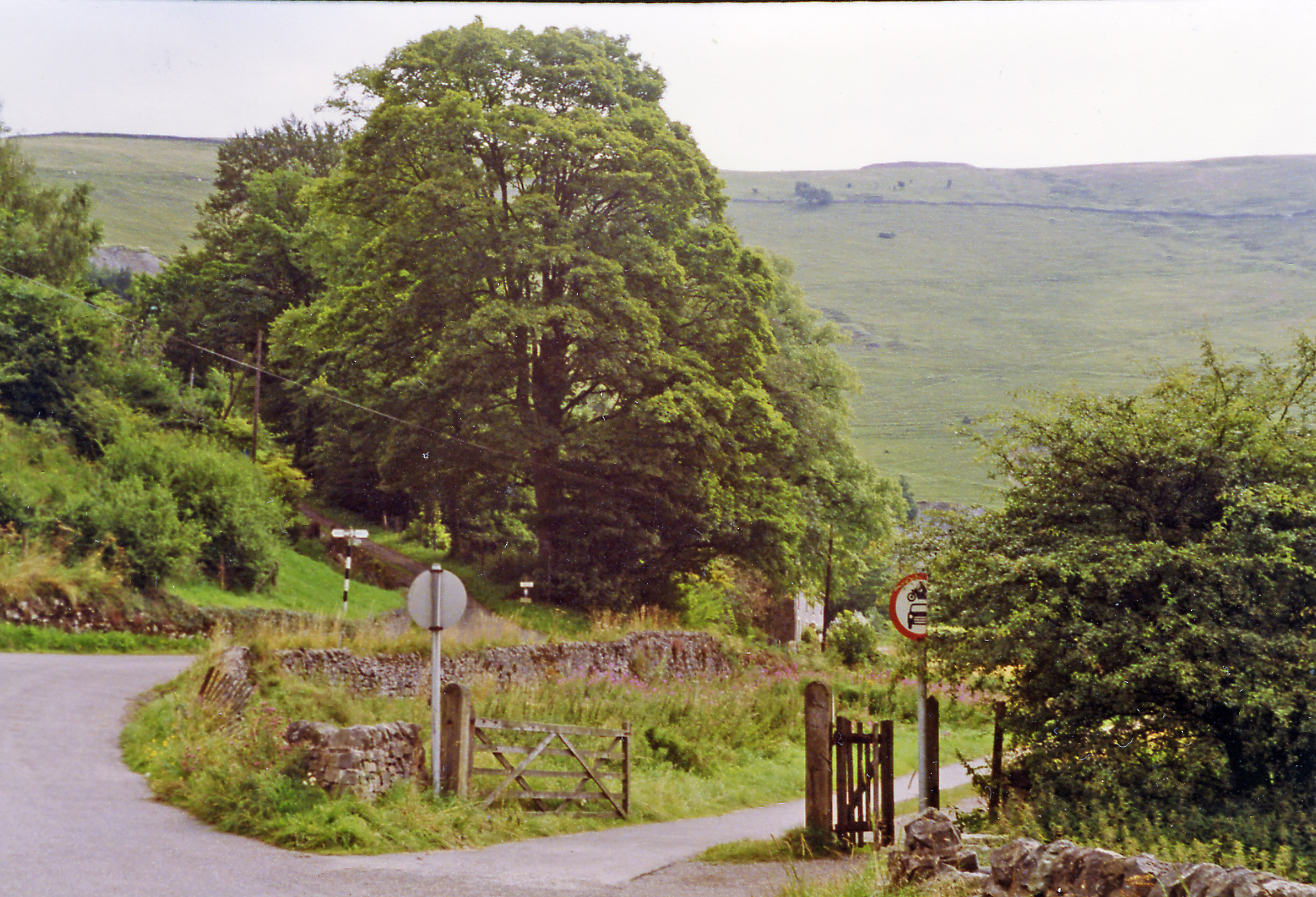
- The site of the station in 1993

General information
- Location: Ecton and Warslow, Staffordshire Moorlands; England
- Coordinates: 53.1224°N 1.8585°W
- Platforms: 1

Other information
- Status: Disused

History
- Original company: Leek and Manifold Light Railway
- Post-grouping: London, Midland and Scottish Railway

Key dates
- 29 June 1904: Opened
- 12 March 1934: Closed
Location

Ecton railway station was a station on the Leek and Manifold Light Railway. It served the hamlet of Ecton and village of Warslow in Staffordshire, England. It opened to the public on 29 June 1904 and was in operation for almost thirty years prior to its closure on 12 March 1934. Ecton Creamery opened in 1920 and the line was used for transporting Stilton cheese. An Ordnance Survey map published in 1922 shows a branch line running to the cheese factory. Milk was transported by road from 1932, leading to a decline in revenue for the railway. In 1937, owner London, Midland & Scottish Railway gifted the track bed to Staffordshire County Council for a public right of way, pioneering such transfers in Britain. Today, the site is part of the Manifold Way that runs between Hulme End and Waterhouses.

== Route ==
Preceding station	Historical railways	Following station
Butterton	Leek and Manifold Valley Light Railway	Hulme End
