= Redhurst Crossing railway station =

Disused railway station in Staffordshire, England

Redhurst Crossing

General information
- Location: Wetton, Staffordshire Moorlands; England
- Coordinates: 53.0982°N 1.8547°W
- Platforms: 1

Other information
- Status: Disused

History
- Original company: Leek and Manifold Light Railway
- Post-grouping: London, Midland and Scottish Railway

Key dates
- August 1915: Opened as Redhurst
- 2 April 1923: Name changed to Redhurst Crossing
- 12 March 1934: Closed
Location

Redhurst Crossing was a railway station on the Leek and Manifold Light Railway, located between Wetton Mill railway station, Staffordshire and Thor's Cave railway station. Not much is documented about the halt, and the line which ran through it is now the Manifold Way.

== History ==
The station opened as Redhurst in August 1915 by the Leek and Manifold Light Railway. Its name was changed to Redhurst Crossing on 2 April 1923. It was also known as Redhurst Halt on some tickets. It closed on 12 March 1934.

== Route ==
Preceding station	Historical railways	Following station
Thor's Cave	Leek and Manifold Valley Light Railway	Wetton Mill
