= Grindon railway station =

Disused railway station in Staffordshire, England

Grindon
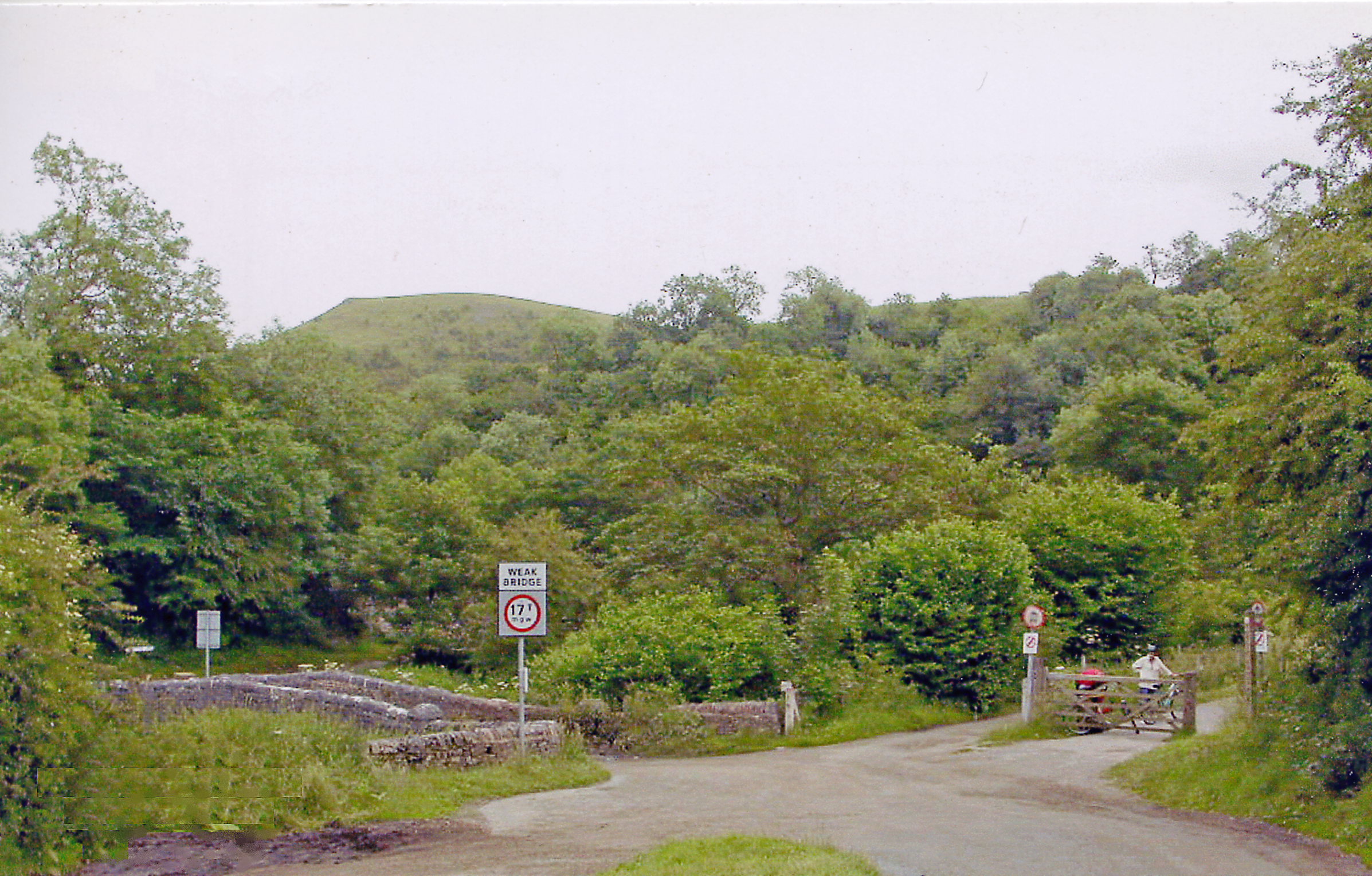
- The site of the station in 2004

General information
- Location: Grindon, Staffordshire Moorlands; England
- Coordinates: 53.0851°N 1.8522°W
- Platforms: 1

Other information
- Status: Disused

History
- Original company: Leek and Manifold Light Railway
- Post-grouping: London, Midland and Scottish Railway

Key dates
- 29 June 1904: Opened
- 12 March 1934: Closed
Location

Grindon railway station was a station on the Leek and Manifold Light Railway. It served the village of Grindon in Staffordshire. The site is now part of the Manifold Way.

== Route ==
Preceding station	Historical railways	Following station
Beeston Tor	Leek and Manifold Valley Light Railway	Thor's Cave
