= Thor's Cave railway station =

Disused railway station in Staffordshire, England

Thor's Cave
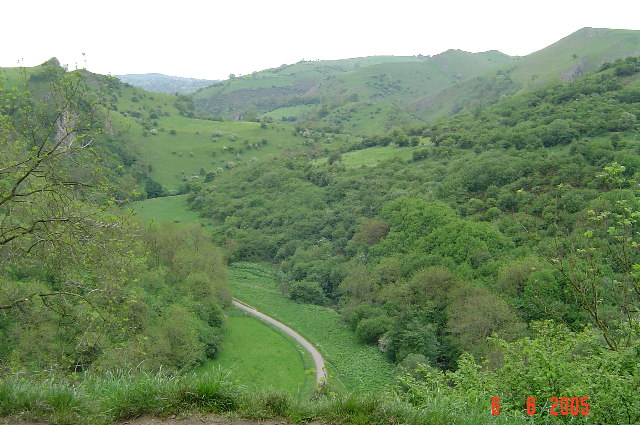
- The site of the station from Thor's Cave

General information
- Location: Wetton, Staffordshire Moorlands; England
- Coordinates: 53.0939°N 1.8554°W
- Platforms: 1

Other information
- Status: Disused

History
- Original company: Leek and Manifold Light Railway
- Post-grouping: London, Midland and Scottish Railway

Key dates
- 29 June 1904: Opened
- 12 March 1934: Closed
Location

Thor's Cave railway station was a station on the Leek and Manifold Light Railway.It served Thor's Cave and the village of Wetton in Staffordshire, England. The station site is now part of the Manifold Way.

== History ==
The station opened as Thor's Cave Halt on 29 June 1904. Its name was changed to Thor's Cave for Wetton in 1914 and changed to Thor's Cave in 1929. It closed on 12 March 1934.

== Route ==
Preceding station	Historical railways	Following station
Grindon	Leek and Manifold Valley Light Railway	Redhurst Halt
