= Ecton, Staffordshire =

Hamlet in Staffordshire, England

Coordinates: 53.122°N 1.857°W

Ecton
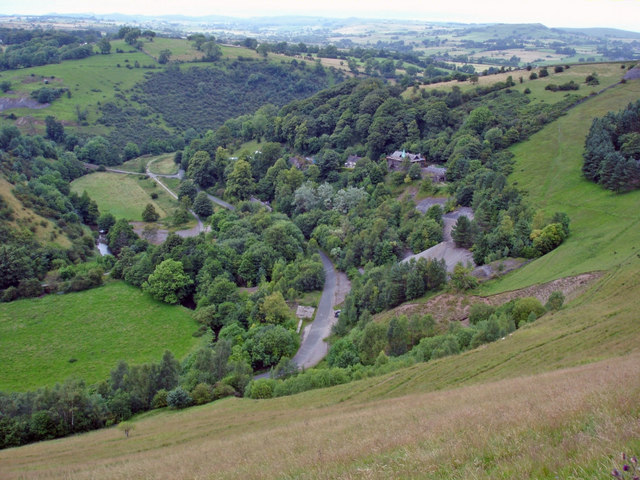
- View of Ecton and the Manifold Valley, taken from Ecton Hill

- Location within Staffordshire
- District: Staffordshire Moorlands
- Shire county: Staffordshire
- Region: West Midlands
- Country: England
- Sovereign state: United Kingdom
- Post town: ASHBOURNE
- Postcode district: DE6
- Dialling code: 01335
- Police: Staffordshire
- Fire: Staffordshire
- Ambulance: West Midlands
- UK Parliament: Staffordshire Moorlands

Ecton is a hamlet in the Staffordshire Moorlands in Staffordshire, England. It is near the Peak District (grid reference SK096584). It is on the Manifold Way, an 8-mile (13 km) walk and cycle path that follows the line of the former Leek and Manifold Valley Light Railway. Population details as at the 2011 census can be found under Ilam.

== Ore mining at Ecton Hill ==
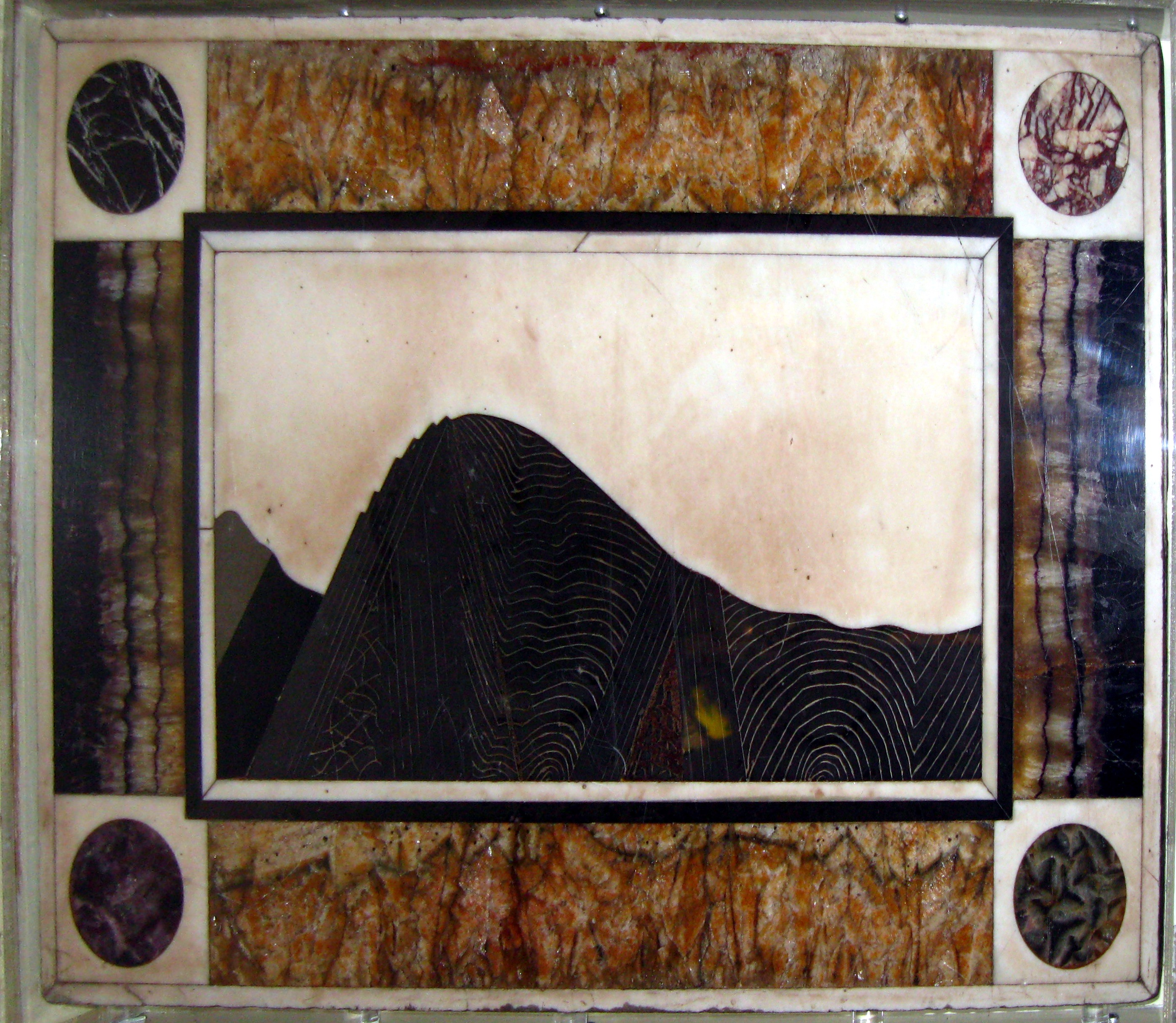
A model of Ecton Hill made out of minerals using a process called Pietra Dura

The village is overlooked by Ecton Hill, which has probably been mined for copper and lead since the sixteenth century. It was leased by the owner the Duke of Devonshire until, in 1760, the fourth duke decided to work it on his own account. Within fifty years, it became the richest individual copper mine in England producing over sixty thousands tons of ore.

Until 1769, when the fifth Duke, William Cavendish, opened his own works at nearby Whiston in the Churnet Valley, the ore was carried to Denby by packhorse for smelting. Much of the copper was used for making brass, but over three hundred tons was supplied to the Navy to protect the hulls of its ships against boring worms, after being rolled at the works of Thomas Evans in Derby.

By 1790, the mine was employing 400 men, women and children and producing 4,000 tons a year. By 1800, the ore had almost been worked out and the Duke relinquished his interest, with the mine finally closing in 1891. The Duke's profits had been almost a third of a million pounds and enabled him, so it is said, to build The Crescent at Buxton.

Lead was smelted on the spot and sent initially to Derby by packhorse, but later by the Cromford Canal en route for the lead market at Hull.

Arthur Ratcliffe MP built a house, modelled on a medieval castle, complete with battlements, next to the former lead mine in 1932.

== Railway station ==
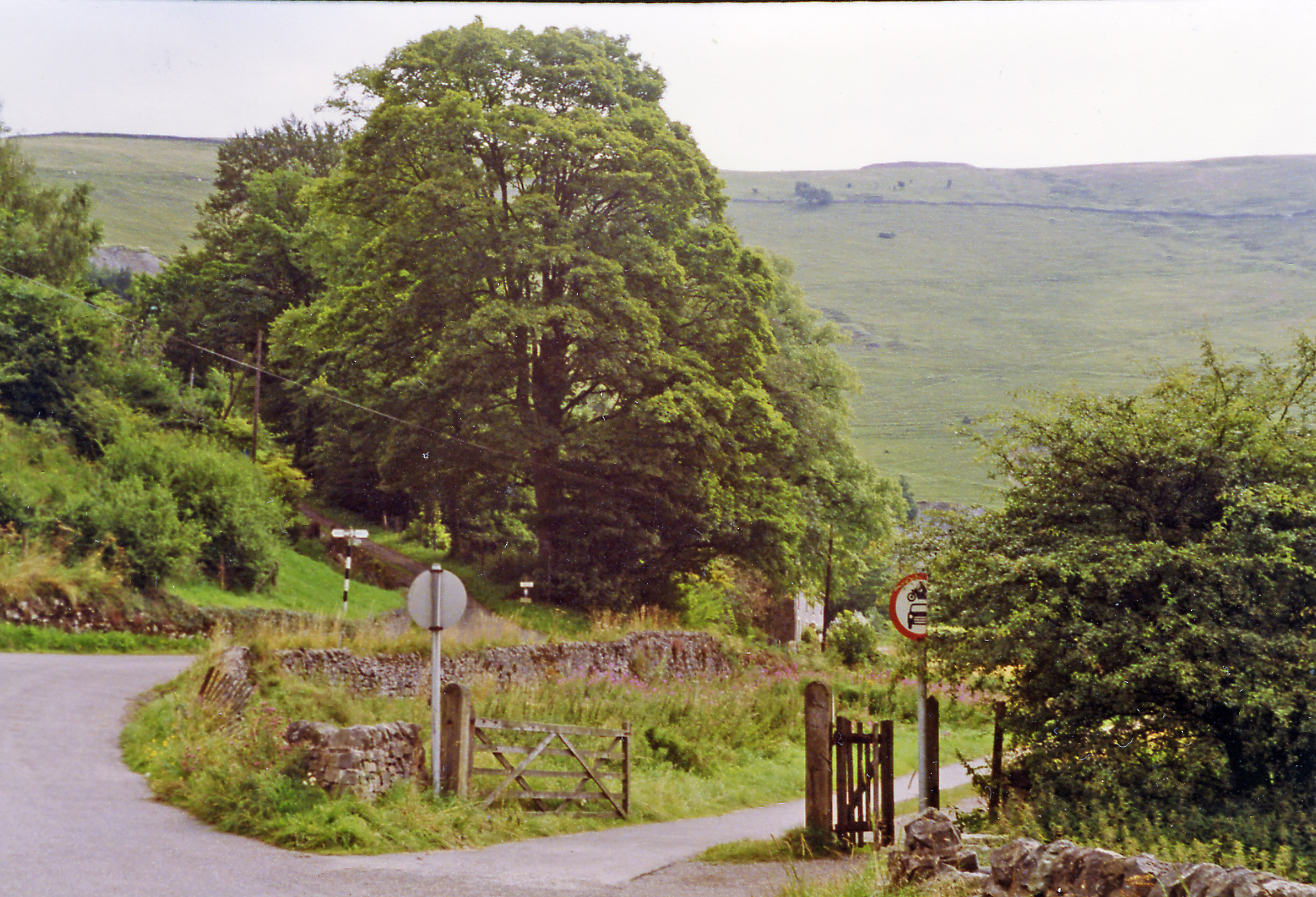
Site of the station in 1993

Ecton was once served by a railway station, which was opened by the Leek and Manifold Valley Light Railway on 27 June 1904; it was operated entirely by the North Staffordshire Railway.

The line was closed in 1934 and, since 1937, the route has been reused as the Manifold Way for pedestrians and cyclists.

== Ecton Creamery ==
The Express Dairies creamery at Ecton created most of the freight traffic on the Leek and Manifold Valley Light Railway line, with most of its product destined via dedicated milk trains for London. In 1911, 222,598 imperial gallons (1,011,950 L) were brought in from the L&MVLR, growing to 717,332 imperial gallons (3,261,060 L) in 1922. Initially, all the milk was carried in milk churns, which had to be manhandled across the railway platforms at Waterhouses.

After the First World War, the churns were loaded into standard-gauge vans taken to and from Ecton on the transporter wagons. Eventually milk tankers were also used, again being transferred between Ecton and Waterhouses on the transporters. The importance of the milk traffic was such that between 1919 and 1926, a special milk trains ran direct between Waterhouses and London, rather than the vans being shunted between various trains until the milk reached its ultimate destination.

In 1932, Express Dairies closed its Ecton creamery, concentrating on its new Rowsley creamery, re-routing milk collection in the area to road transport. The loss of this milk trade removed most of the goods traffic from the line. Two years after the closure of the creamery, in 1934, the L&MVLR closed.

== See also ==
- Ecton Mines
- Butterton
- Grindon
- Hulme End
- Thor's Cave
- Warslow
