= Long Low, Wetton =

Archaeological site in Staffordshire, England

Coordinates: 53.08218°N 1.81932°W

Long Low is a Neolithic and Bronze Age site in the English county of Staffordshire. It is about 2 km SE of Wetton (grid reference SK122539).

It consists of two round cairns linked by a connecting bank – an unusual layout and one that is unique in England. The northern cairn measures 23 metres (75 ft) in diameter and survives to a height of 2.4 metres (7 ft 10 in). It appears to be related to other chamber tombs of the Peak District group and was excavated by Samuel Carrington in 1849. Carrington found a burial chamber built from limestone orthostats with a paved floor. The bones of thirteen individuals were recovered as well as three leaf-shaped flint arrowheads.

The smaller southern cairn is 15 metres (49 ft) across and survives to 1.2 metres (3 ft 11 in) in height following extensive modern damage. It contained evidence of a cremation burial. Further cremations were found in the connecting bank which was built from a parallel row of limestone orthostats and is around 200 metres (660 ft) long, 10 metres (33 ft) wide and 2 metres (6 ft 7 in) high. It is now topped by a modern dry stone wall.

Because of the damage to the site, its rarity and the antiquity of the Carrington excavation it is unclear as to the precise nature of the monument. It is possible that the bank is a bank barrow which had a later Neolithic chambered cairn (the north cairn) built on one end and then a Bronze Age round barrow finally added at the southern end.
