= Listed buildings in Wetton, Staffordshire =

Wetton is a civil parish in the district of Staffordshire Moorlands, Staffordshire, England. It contains 19 listed buildings that are recorded in the National Heritage List for England. Of these, one is at Grade II*, the middle of the three grades, and the others are at Grade II, the lowest grade. The parish contains the village of Wetton and the surrounding countryside. Most of the listed buildings are in the village and include a church, houses, farmhouses and cottages. Around the site of Wetton Mill is a group of listed buildings, including a bridge, and to the northeast of these are two relatively isolated listed buildings, a house and a farmhouse. Further along the river is another bridge.

== Key ==
| Grade | Criteria |
|---|---|
| II* | Particularly important buildings of more than special interest |
| II | Buildings of national importance and special interest |

== Buildings ==
| Name and location | Photograph | Date | Notes | Grade |
|---|---|---|---|---|
| St Margaret's Church; 53.09562°N 1.83916°W | | 14th century | The oldest part of the church is the tower, the rest of the church being rebuilt in 1820. It is built in stone with slate roofs, and consists of a nave and a chancel in one unit, a south porch, and a west tower. The tower is unbuttressed, and has massive quoins, a west window with Y-tracery, gargoyles, and an embattled parapet with corner finials. The windows in the body of the church have pointed heads, and the porch has a four-centred arched entrance. | II* |
| 22 and 23 Wetton; 53.09628°N 1.83959°W | | 17th century | A farmhouse and a farm building, later a pair of houses, in stone with a tile roof. There are two storeys, and the windows are casements, some with mullions. The doorway and the ground floor windows have hood moulds. | II |
| Manor House; 53.09630°N 1.83879°W | | 17th century | A stone farmhouse that has a tile roof with a coped verge on the left. There is one storey and an L-shaped plan. The doorway has a flat hood, and the windows are chamfered and mullioned and contain casements. | II |
| Hallows Grange; 53.09531°N 1.83756°W | | 1675 | A house that was remodelled in the 19th century, it is in stone, and has a tile roof with coped verges. The house has a T-shaped plan, with a main range of two storeys and an attic and three bays, a lower two-storey wing to the right, and a rear wing. In the main range is a casement window, a gabled dormer with one light above three lights, all under a stepped hood mould, and most of the other windows are sashes, and most mullions. | II |
| 14 and 15 Wetton; 53.09593°N 1.83813°W | | 18th century (probable) | A pair of cottages that were altered in the 19th century, they are in limestone and have a tile roof with coped verges. There are two storeys and an attic, and each cottage has one bay. The windows are mullioned and contain casements. The doorway and most of the windows have hood moulds. | II |
| 21 Wetton; 53.09628°N 1.83925°W | — | 18th century (probable) | A house in limestone with a slate roof, it has two storeys and three bays. On the front is a gabled porch, and 20th-century top-opening windows, some of which have retained their mullions. | II |
| Dale Bridge; 53.12310°N 1.85986°W | | 18th century | The bridge carries a road over the River Manifold. It is in stone, and consists of a single semi-elliptical arch. The bridge has rusticated voussoirs, a string course, and a coped parapet which sweeps round to squat end piers with pyramidal caps. | II |
| Pepper Inn; 53.10692°N 1.84545°W | | 18th century | A house, at one time an inn, it is in stone with a tile roof. There are three storeys and three bays. In the centre is a doorway, above it is a circular window, and the other windows are mullioned. Attached to the left is a stable extension that contains doorways and casement windows. | II |
| Townend Farmhouse; 53.09659°N 1.83619°W | — | 18th century | The farmhouse is in limestone, with a tile roof. There are two storeys, and an L-shaped plan, consisting of a main range of two bays, and a rear wing. The doorway has a bracketed hood, and the windows have chamfered mullions and rebated surrounds, and contain casements. | II |
| Broad Ecton Farmhouse; 53.11479°N 1.85157°W | — | 1824 | The farmhouse and attached workman's cottage are in stone with quoins, and have a tile roof with coped verges. The house has two storeys and four bays. On the front is a lean-to porch, and the windows are mullioned and contain casements. The cottage to the left is lower, and has two storeys and two bays. | II |
| Carr Farmhouse; 53.09556°N 1.83992°W | | Early 19th century | The farmhouse is in limestone, and has a tile roof with a coped verge. There are two storeys, an L-shaped plan, and a front of two bays. The farmhouse has one casement window, and the other windows are sashes. | II |
| Dale Farmhouse; 53.10377°N 1.85938°W | | Early 19th century | The farmhouse is in stone and has a tile roof with coped verges. There are two storeys, two bays, and a low brick lean-to on the left. On the front is a gabled porch, and the windows are casements with mullions. | II |
| Wetton Bridge; 53.10198°N 1.85921°W | | Early 19th century | The bridge carries a road over the River Manifold. It is in stone, and consists of four semicircular arches of graded sizes. Between the arches are triangular cutwaters, and the bridge has a plain parapet that continues to form an embankment to the road. | II |
| Wetton Mill Café; 53.10212°N 1.85873°W | | Early 19th century (probable) | A pair of agricultural buildings, later used as a café, they are in stone and have tile roofs with coped verges. They are in one storey, and form two parallel gabled ranges. The larger range to the east has a central doorway flanked by top-opening mullioned windows. | II |
| Wetton Mill House; 53.10216°N 1.85851°W | | Early 19th century | The house is in stone and has a tile roof with coped verges. There are two storeys and four bays. On the front is a gabled porch with quoins and a cambered head, and the windows are casements with mullions. | II |
| Stable block and granary southeast of Wetton Mill House; 53.10196°N 1.85833°W | | Early 19th century | The buildings are in stone and have a tile roof. The main block has two storeys, and there is a single-storey extension to the right. In the main building is a top-opening window, a stable door, and a flight of external steps. The extension has a blocked doorway and two stable doors, all with segmental heads. | II |
| Yew Tree Farmhouse; 53.09454°N 1.83684°W | | Early 19th century | The farmhouse is in limestone with quoins, and has a tile roof with coped verges. There are two storeys, two parallel ranges, and a front of two bays. In each range is a doorway with a flat hood, and the windows are sashes, some with hood moulds. | II |
| The Old Post Office; 53.09608°N 1.83909°W | | Early to mid-19th century | A house with a former stable to the left, it is in stone with quoins, and has a tile roof with coped verges. There is one storey, and the former stable contains a board door with a shouldered lintel to the left, and a stable door and a small window to the right. The house has a protruding gabled bay, with steps leading up to a doorway. There is a doorway to the left and a casement window on each side of the gabled bay. | II |
| Stable block and granary east of Wetton Mill House; 53.10206°N 1.85842°W | | Early to mid-19th century | The buildings are in stone with quoins, and have tile roofs with coped verges on kneelers. They consist of a main block with two storeys and two bays, an extension to the right with a single storey, and a low brick lean-to. In the main block is a stable door, top-opening windows, a loft opening, and a mullioned window, and the extension has a stable door and top-opening windows. | II |
