= Butterton =

Village in Staffordshire, England

Coordinates: 53.1073°N 1.8924°W

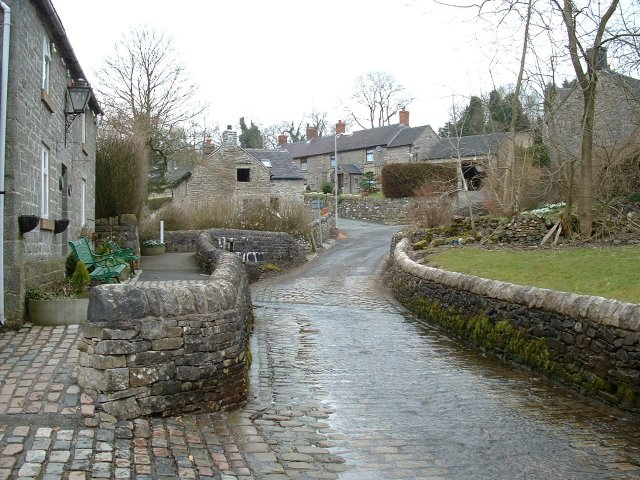
- The Ford, Butterton

- Location within Staffordshire
- Population: 213
- OS grid reference: SK073566
- Civil parish: Butterton
- District: Staffordshire Moorlands
- Shire county: Staffordshire
- Region: West Midlands
- Country: England
- Sovereign state: United Kingdom
- Post town: LEEK
- Postcode district: ST13
- Police: Staffordshire
- Fire: Staffordshire
- Ambulance: West Midlands
- UK Parliament: Staffordshire Moorlands

Butterton is a small village in the Staffordshire Moorlands in Staffordshire, England. It is close to the Peak District (grid reference SK075565). It overlooks the Manifold Valley and Ecton Hill, which rises 1,212 feet above sea level. Butterton lies 5 miles east of Leek and roughly 8 miles from Alton Towers theme park. The village is just west of the limestone area, and so is mainly built of local sandstone. It contains a Grade II listed church. In the centre of Butterton there is an unusual ford where the Hoo Brook runs along the village street.

Butterton was served by a railway station which was opened by the Leek and Manifold Valley Light Railway on 27 June 1904. The line closed in 1934, and the route of the railway past the station is now designated the Manifold Way, a footpath and cycle route. Butterton is one of 17 doubly Thankful Villages that suffered no fatalities in both the Great War of 1914–1918 and in the Second World War.

== Demography ==
According to the 2001 census, the population of Butterton was 213, with a near equal number of males and females. This was lower than in 1841, where the population was 388. In modern times, most of the houses in Butterton are detached or semi-detached and owner-occupied, with the largest age category being 45 to 64.

== History ==
The name ‘Buterdon’ or ‘Butterton’ comes from ‘butere’, meaning butter, and ‘dun’ meaning hill, and was given this name as the area had good pasture. Butterton is also known as Butterton-in-the-Peak to differentiate it from Butterton in Trentham parish, near Newcastle-under-Lyme. In the 1850s, a small brook at the foot of the village was a sulphurous spring which was said to be beneficial in scorbutic cases. Although Butterton was in Mayfield parish it was physically separated from the remainder of the parish by nine miles. The parish was enlarged on 1 April 1934 by 205 acres to include part of Bradnop and Cawdry. In 1966, however, the parish broke up into smaller segments, and so now Butterton is a parish of its own.

== Economy ==
Ecton Hill, near Butterton, is embedded with the remains of copper and lead mining. It was first used extensively in the mid 17th century; however, there is evidence that mining of the area took place centuries earlier. As a result of the history of mining, there are numerous packhorse routes around Butterton and Ecton Hill which were used to transport copper and lead ore from Ecton to smelting works. In 1881, the main employment was agriculture, with 51 out of 124 inhabitants in this sector (all males). The main employment for women was domestic service.

Although Butterton is a commuter village, in 1986 there were a few shops, such as a butcher's, a general store and a small shop and tea room. There is also an old traditional pub in the centre of the village, The Black Lion Inn, which offers food and accommodation.

The first mention of a post office in the village is in 1892, when a rubber datestamp was issued.

== Landmarks ==
=== The Hillocks ===
On Ecton hillside is the unusual copper-topped house known as The Hillocks which was built in 1933 by Arthur Ratcliffe, the MP for Leek. When first constructed the property had two storeys with a flat roof, but this leaked water badly and so another storey was added.

== Education ==
The small village primary school closed in 1979, as there were too few pupils to attend. The nearest primary school today is in Warslow (3 miles away); public transport is funded by the county education committee. There is a secondary school in nearby Leek, to which transport is also provided. The former primary school building has now become the village hall.

== Culture and community ==
The Butterton Wakes takes place every August bank holiday weekend to celebrate the birth of St Bartholomew. It has been running for over 100 years and is organised by the Butterton Wakes Committee. It takes place in St Bartholomew's Church and the Village Hall, and all the money raised goes towards upkeep of the village hall and church. The village also has regular events such as the Christmas Silver Band concerts, the Harvest Supper and afternoon teas in the church.

The village is featured on Darren Hayman's album Thankful Villages Volume 1.

== See also ==
- Listed buildings in Butterton
