= Hulme End railway station =

Railway station in Staffordshire, England

Hulme End
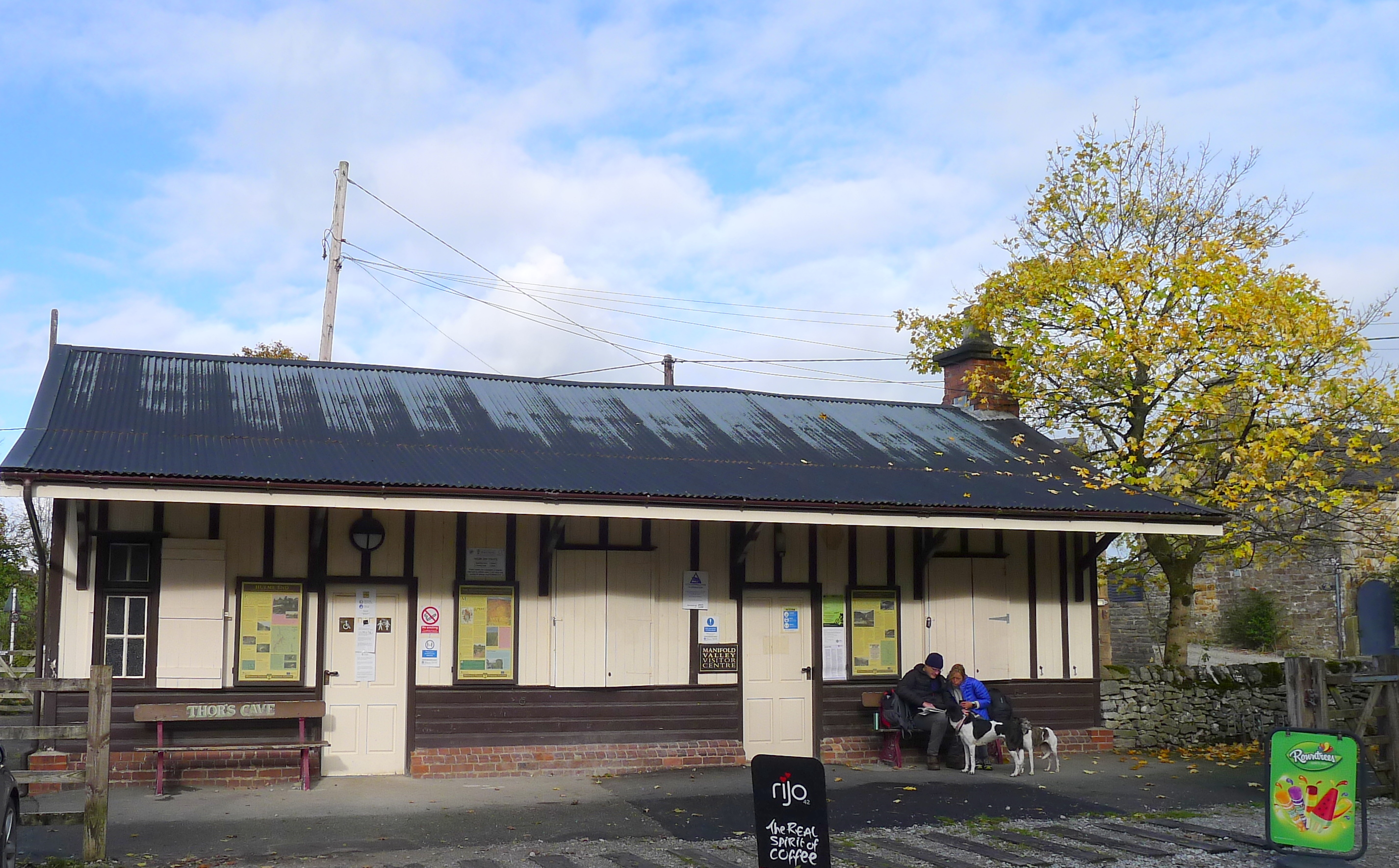
- The restored station building pictured in 2021

General information
- Location: Hulme End, Staffordshire Moorlands; England
- Coordinates: 53.1308°N 1.8477°W
- Grid reference: SK102593
- Platforms: 1

Other information
- Status: Disused

History
- Original company: Leek and Manifold Valley Light Railway
- Post-grouping: London, Midland and Scottish Railway

Key dates
- 29 June 1904: Opened
- 12 March 1934: Closed
Location

Hulme End railway station is a disused railway station at Hulme End in Staffordshire, England.

The station was the terminus of the 2 ft 6 in (762 mm) Leek and Manifold Valley Light Railway which ran 8 1/4 miles (13.3 km) from Waterhouses where it made a connection with the standard gauge Waterhouses branch line of the North Staffordshire Railway.

Opened in 1904, the station had a single platform and a small goods yard with two sidings laid out for the use of transporter wagons, with a section of standard gauge track at the end of each siding. The station was also the servicing and storage point for the line's locomotives and coaching stock with both a locomotive shed and a carriage shed being provided.

The line became part of the London, Midland and Scottish Railway in 1923 but the finances of the line were poor and the line closed in 1934. After closure, the route's right of way was acquired by Staffordshire County Council and the station site at Hulme End became a car park. The station building was retained and, now restored, is used as a visitor information centre.

The North Staffordshire Railway timetable and Bradshaw's from 1910 referred to Hulme End for Sheen and Hartington. Hartington railway station on the Ashbourne Line lay 3 miles (4.8 km) north east of Hulme End.

Preceding station	Disused railways	Following station
Terminus	Leek and Manifold Valley Light Railway	Ecton; Line and station closed
