= Leek and Manifold Valley Light Railway =

Former railway line in Staffordshire, England

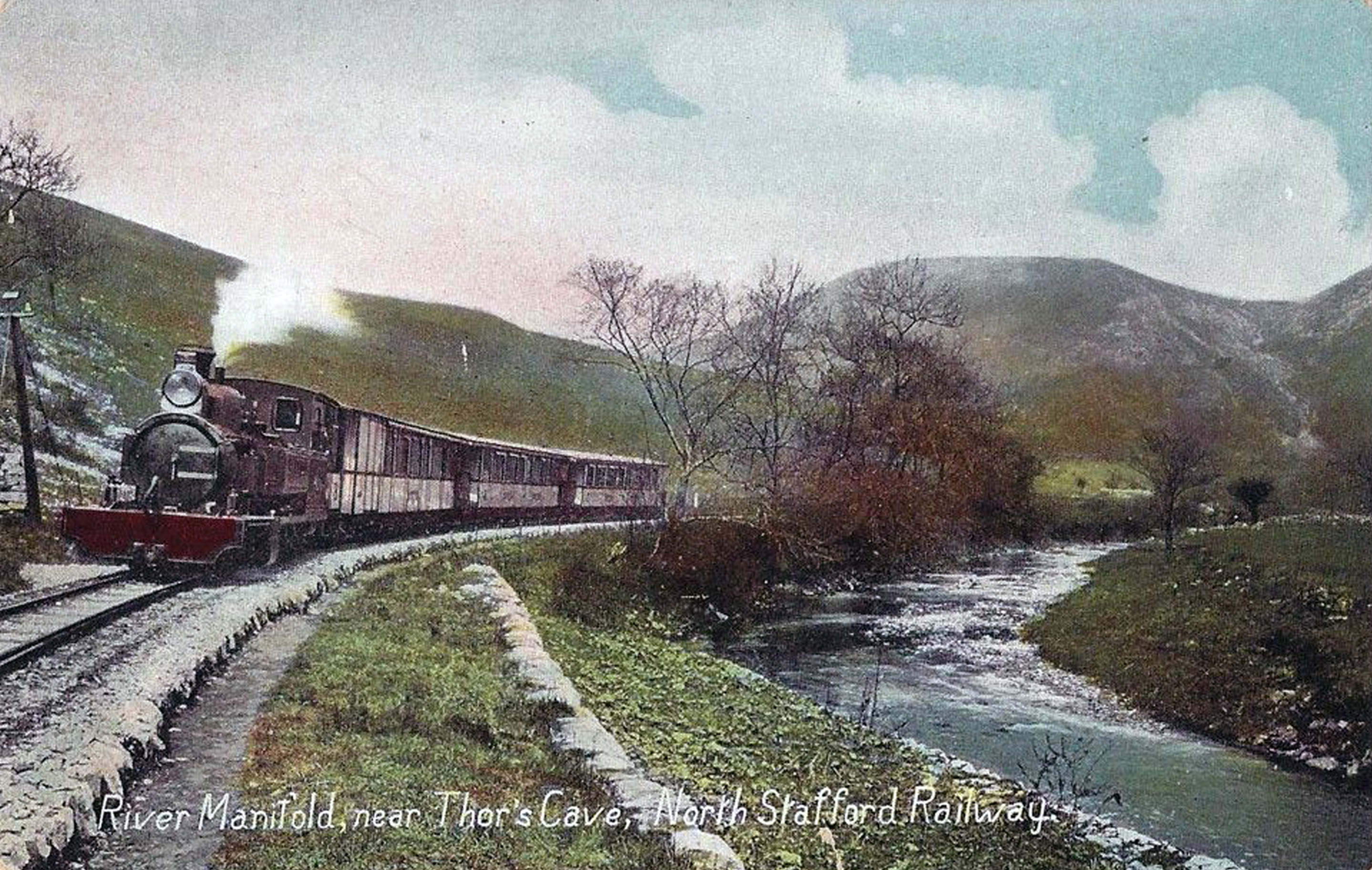
- Colourised postcard of the railway

Overview
- Status: Abandoned
- Locale: England
- Termini: Hulme End; Waterhouses

History
- Opened: 29 June 1904
- Closed: 12 March 1934

Technical
- Line length: 8 1/4 mi (13.3 km)
- Track gauge: 2 ft 6 in (762 mm)

The Leek and Manifold Valley Light Railway (L&MVLR) was a narrow gauge railway in Staffordshire, England, that operated between 1904 and 1934. The line mainly carried milk from dairies in the region, acting as a feeder to the 4 ft 8 1/2 in (1,435 mm) standard gauge system. It also provided passenger services to the small villages and beauty spots along its route. The line was built to a 2 ft 6 in (762 mm) narrow gauge and to the light rail standards provided by the Light Railways Act 1896, to reduce construction costs. The route of the line is now a rail trail.

== History ==
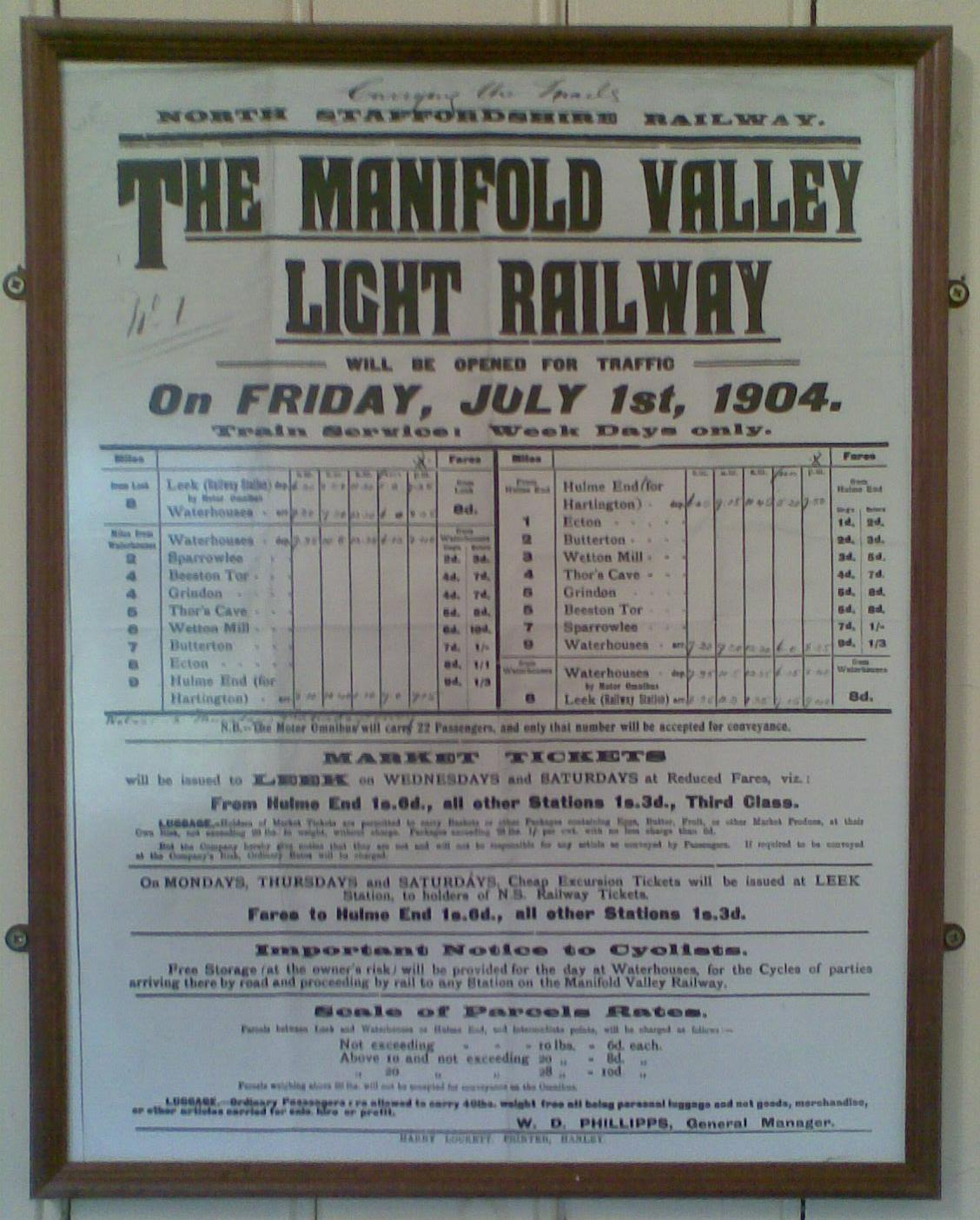
A timetable poster of 1904, now framed in the old station at Hulme End

Authorised by the Leek, Caldon Low, and Hartington Light Railways Order 1898, this was the narrow gauge section of the Leek Light Railways. The railway ran for 30 years, from 1904 to 1934. Its engineer was Everard Calthrop, a leading advocate of narrow gauge railways and builder of the Barsi Light Railway in India; the chairman of the company was Charles Bill, MP for Leek. A private concern, it was run by the North Staffordshire Railway on a percentage basis, but it later came under the control of the London, Midland and Scottish Railway (LMS) in 1923.

The line was constructed to a high standard, as Calthrop applied lessons learned on his other railways. Rail used was 35 lb/yard (17.28 kg/m) and the quality of trackwork is reflected in the fact that no relaying was ever necessary.

The line was single tracked and most services only involved the use of one engine in steam. Services began from Hulme End, where the locomotive sheds were, with a passing loop at Wetton Mill, which was never used as such. At Waterhouses, the timetable allowed for connections from Leek.

Trains ran at a maximum speed of 15 miles per hour (24.1 km/h) and most halts ran on a request basis. More than this, the train would also often stop to pick up passengers at other places on the lineside footpath, if requested. Timetables mostly showed single journey times of 50 minutes, with some showing an hour.

Most outbound freight consisted of milk, in both churns and bulk tankers, and the products of the dairy goods factory at Ecton. In all, some 300 milk churns were handled daily at Waterhouses and, from 1919, a daily milk train ran from Waterhouses to London specifically for this traffic. Latterly milk tanks were used, carried on the transporter wagons. Passenger traffic was minimal – the settlements were mostly some distance from the line – except on bank holidays, when all of the line's rolling stock was used to run frequent services to handle the crowds.

There was some talk of extending the line northwards to Buxton, whereby Hulme End and its engine shed would become the halfway point of the line, but this never materialised.

The railway was filmed in operation for Pathé News in 1930, under the title "A Quaint Little Railway".

== Route ==
The North Staffordshire Railway's branch from Leek ended at Waterhouses (Note: Waterhouses station site location: 53.0484°N 1.8647°W). The L&MVLR continued from an end-on junction with this line. It ran for 8 1/4 miles (13.3 km) down the valley of the river Hamps as far as Beeston Tor, before turning up the limestone gorge that the river Manifold had formed, through to Hulme End (Note: Hulme End station site location: 53.1310°N 1.8470°W). The line had a large number of stations in a relatively short distance, and there were refreshment rooms at Thor's Cave and Beeston Tor. In all, the line crossed the river Manifold dozens of times, including nine times in the short section between Sparrowlee and Beeston Tor.

All stations had rather grand signs, sometimes grander than the facilities, and platforms were just 6 inches (152 mm) high. All stations had sidings, except for Beeston Tor and Redhurst Halt:

- Hulme End station was a large building, with adjacent engine and coach sheds (two roads in each). In the timetable, it was described as Hulme End for Hartington. Hartington is around 3 miles (4.8 km) away.
- Ecton station had both a standard gauge and narrow gauge siding, with a narrow gauge extension to the milk factory. The presence of the railway did not kick-start the local mining industry, as hoped.
- Butterton station (also known locally as Ecton Lea) had a waiting room and a siding.
- Wetton Mill station had a waiting room and a standard gauge siding. It had ceased to be a working mill before the railway was built.
- At Redhurst Halt, an old coach served as a waiting room. There was no siding here.
- Thor's Cave station largely served Wetton village. It had a waiting room and its refreshment room was moved to Wetton in 1917.
- Grindon station, located at Weags Bridge, had a loop containing a 75 feet (22.86 m) standard gauge siding.
- Beeston Tor station had no siding, but a refreshment room.
- Sparrowlee station served Lee House Farm, but nowhere else; there was not even a waiting room here. The siding included a 60 feet (18.29 m) standard gauge section.
- At Waterhouses station, the platform had booking offices and a goods shed. There were two short loops and three short sidings, which joined with standard gauge lines. The site of the station is now a car park for the Manifold Way; a road-widening scheme in the 1960s removed some of the evidence of the L&MVLR station.

== Locomotives and rolling stock ==
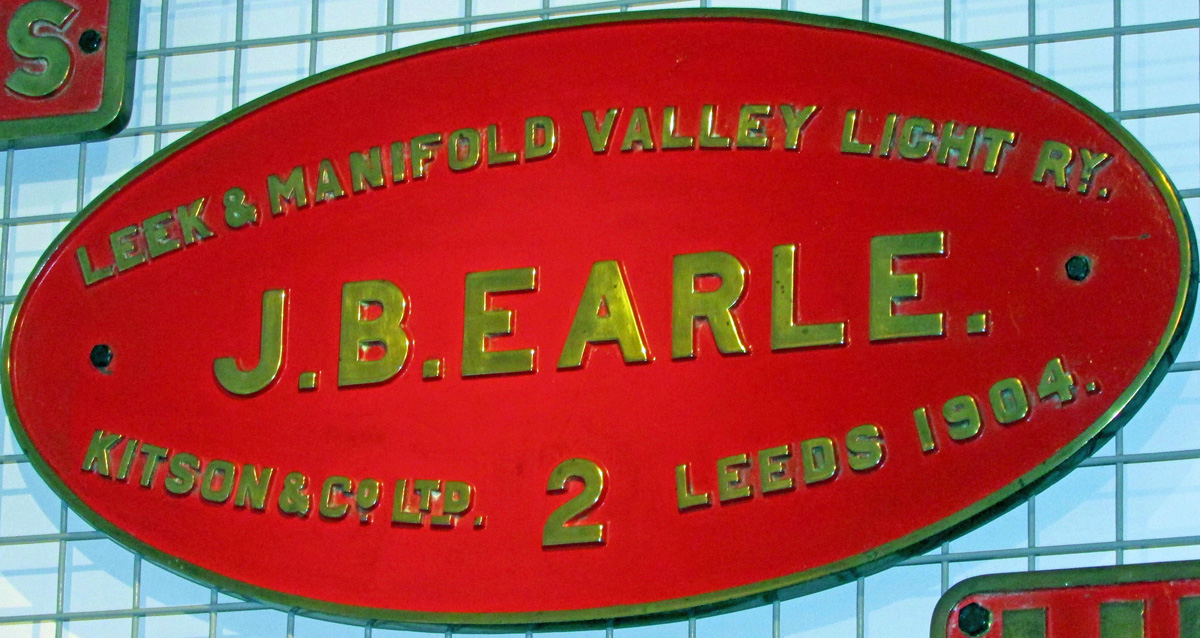
Kitson's manufacturer's plate dated 1904 from J.B. Earle, displayed in the museum at Tywyn, on the Talyllyn Railway in Wales

The company had only two locomotives, which were both outside-cylindered 2-6-4Ts, built by Kitson & Co. of Leeds in 1904, which were the first 2-6-4T locomotives to run in Britain; the first standard gauge examples were the Great Central Railway's Class 1B of 1914. Number 1 was named E.R. Calthrop, after the line's engineer, and number 2 was named J.B. Earle, after the resident engineer. Due to the influence of Calthrop, the locomotives had a somewhat colonial appearance, with large headlights which were never used. They also had fittings for cow catchers, again never fitted, and they sported rerailing jacks by the smokebox. The locomotives were originally painted brown with gold and black lining, replaced by crimson lake with gold and black lining after Grouping in 1923. Latterly, after the Great Depression had set in, they ran in plain black.

There was no turntable on the line and engines ran chimney first towards Waterhouses, despite initial concerns (usually engines on a gradient run the other way, to keep the water over the firebox crown) about the steeper down section (1 in 40) out of Waterhouses. In latter years, E.R. Calthrop returned from repairs in Crewe facing the other way, as can be seen in later photographs.

There were four coaches: two first class and two brake composite thirds; they were originally painted primrose yellow and later repainted in LMS Midland red.

Freight wagons consisted of one box van and two open wagons; the latter were built by the Leeds Forge Company and were largely designed for the transport of loose milk churns.

Additionally, there were also five transporter wagons, four short and one long, which were technically low-side bogie goods wagons. These were supplied by the Cravens Railway Carriage & Wagon Company at a cost of £315 each. Uniquely in Britain, in a piggy-back style, these were capable of carrying standard gauge wagons - particularly milk tankers and coal wagons – to standard gauge sidings along the route. However, the extra height and width of the loading gauge caused by this arrangement (such as those seen in the dimensions of Swainsley Tunnel) undid some of the benefits of using a narrow gauge. This arrangement also meant that standard gauge lengths of track on sidings had to be constructed level with the rails of the low transporters.

== Service frequency ==
Trains started and finished at Hulme End, at the northern end of the line, where the engine sheds were located.

After opening, there were initially three trains daily in each direction; this increased to four on Thursdays and Saturdays, and later to five.

After an attempt by the North Staffordshire Railway, as early as 1904, to reduce the service during the winter months to a service only on Wednesdays and Saturdays, the Manifold Company secured an agreement that there should be a minimum of two trains in each direction throughout the year.

On bank holidays, there were seven trains daily and, at peak times, both engines and all carriages/wagons would be in use; planks and awnings were placed on the open wagons to make them usable by passengers, albeit rather rudimentary. In Whit Week in 1905, it is recorded that some 5,000 passengers were carried and the most intensive service saw trains operating from 7am to 10pm.

Sunday services began in 1905, but ended in 1930, thus losing much tourist revenue.

The most important traffic on the line was from the United Dairies creamery at Ecton. Most of the product was destined via dedicated milk trains for London. In 1911, 222,598 imperial gallons (1,011,950 L) were brought in from the L&MVLR growing to 717,332 imperial gallons (3,261,060 L) in 1922. Initially, all the milk was carried in milk churns, which had to be manhandled across the platforms at Waterhouses.

After the First World War, the churns were loaded into standard gauge vans taken to and from Ecton on the transporter wagons. Eventually, milk tankers were also used, again being transferred between Ecton and Waterhouses on the transporters. The importance of the milk traffic was such that, between 1919 and 1926, special milk trains ran directly between Waterhouses and London, rather than the vans being shunted between various trains until the milk reached its ultimate destination.

== Closure ==
In 1932, United Dairies closed its Ecton creamery, rerouting milk collection in the area to road transport. Rival company Express Dairies opened a new creamery at Rowsley, which took some of the milk production and benefited from a direct connection to standard gauge railway network. The loss of this milk trade removed most of the goods traffic from the line. Furthermore, the developing motor bus services served the villages much better, as these settlements were sited largely on the hills and often some distance from the line itself. The railway was closed in consequence, to reopen briefly in 1933, but closed finally to all traffic on Monday 12 March 1934.

J.B. Earle was cut up at the LMS's Crewe Works, whilst E.R. Calthrop was used in the track-removal train, which worked south from Hulme End, before being cut up at Waterhouses. All that remains of the engines are three nameplates.

== The line today: The Manifold Way ==
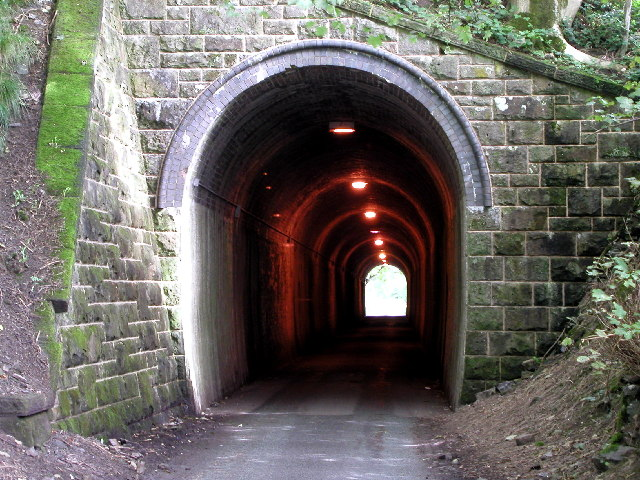
Swainsley Tunnel, viewed from the southern portal, is now used by single-file road traffic (August 2002)

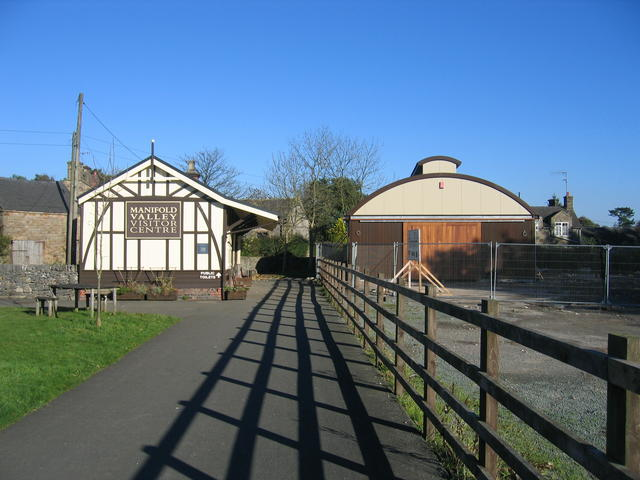
Hulme End station (left) is now a visitor centre and the former engine shed on the right, which was rebuilt to resemble the original; a small part of the original framework exists inside (November 2006)

The Manifold Way was opened in July 1937, after the LMS handed over the trackbed to Staffordshire County Council. It continues on to Waterhouses, via Hulme End, as a bridlepath; it tarmacked throughout, so is ideal for wheelchair users and prams. For about 1 1/2 miles (2.4 km) near Wetton Mill, the route is shared with motor traffic where the C-road has been diverted; this section includes Swainsley Tunnel, built by Sir Thomas Wardle who, despite being a shareholder in the railway, did not want to see it crossing his land.

Some notable scenery found along the eight-mile (13 km) route include Thor's Cave, Wetton Hill and Beeston Tor. Many consider this section bears comparison with the better-known Dovedale, a few miles to the east. The National Trust owns several of these sites, as part of their South Peak Estate.

The Old Light Railway Hotel at Hulme End is now called the Manifold Inn. There are campsites at Hulme End and Wetton Village.

At Ecton Hill, a 4,000-year-old copper mine lies along the route; there is still evidence of the loading platforms along the route of the old railway. A dairy once stood here and one can still see where milk churns were once loaded onto the morning milk train. The Ecton dairy was famous for its Stilton cheese.

The old engine shed at Hulme End opened as a cafe called The Tea Junction in 2010.

== Modelling ==
Slater's Plastikard produces an O16.5 scale kit of the locomotives, with Dorset Kits offering brass coach construction kits together with etched brass kits for both long and short transporter wagons, the open bogie wagons and the bogie van to match in this scale. These can all be built to run on the correct 17.5mm track.

Port Wynnstay Models of Derby offered a resin outline of the short wheelbase transport car/wagon.

Meridian Models produced an OO9 scale locomotive body in white metal to fit on a Minitrix chassis. Worsley Works produces a basic scratch kit for the carriages, requiring addition of bogies (where applicable), couplings, door handles and interior to complete. Ducket Models produces the transporter cars/wagons in this scale, as well as detailing for the aforementioned Worsley Works coach kits.

Roundhouse has produced a live steam model in 1:19 scale (16mm/foot) of the Kitson 2-6-4 locomotive in the NSR livery.

There is a model at the visitors' centre in Hulme End, along one wall inside the former station building. This shows a representation of Hulme End station, yard and nearby buildings in OO9 scale with a short run (scaled down distance) to a model of Butterton station.

== Gallery ==
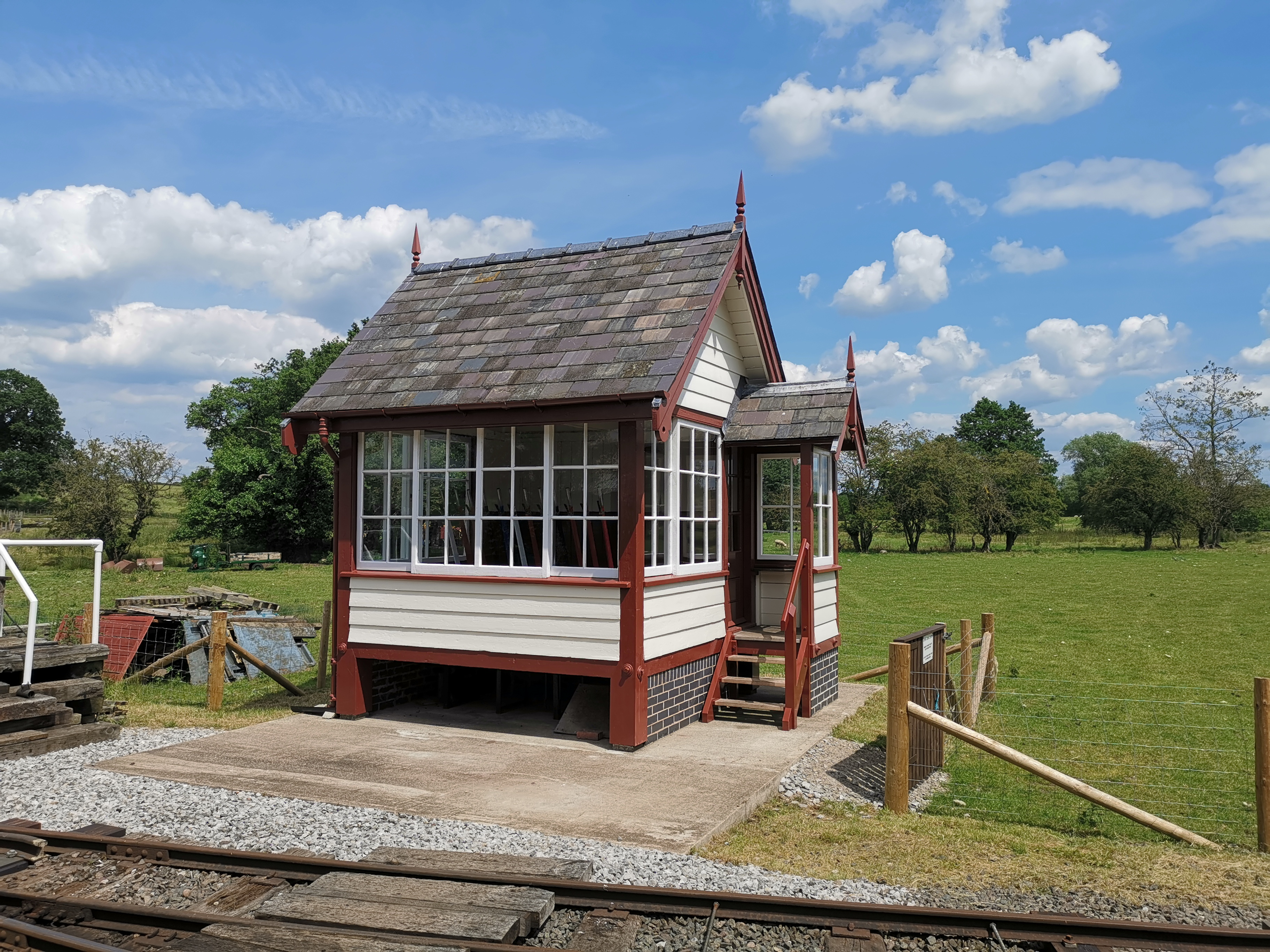
A former Leek and Manifold Valley Light Railway signal box from Waterhouses, now located at the Amerton Railway in Staffordshire (June 2019).

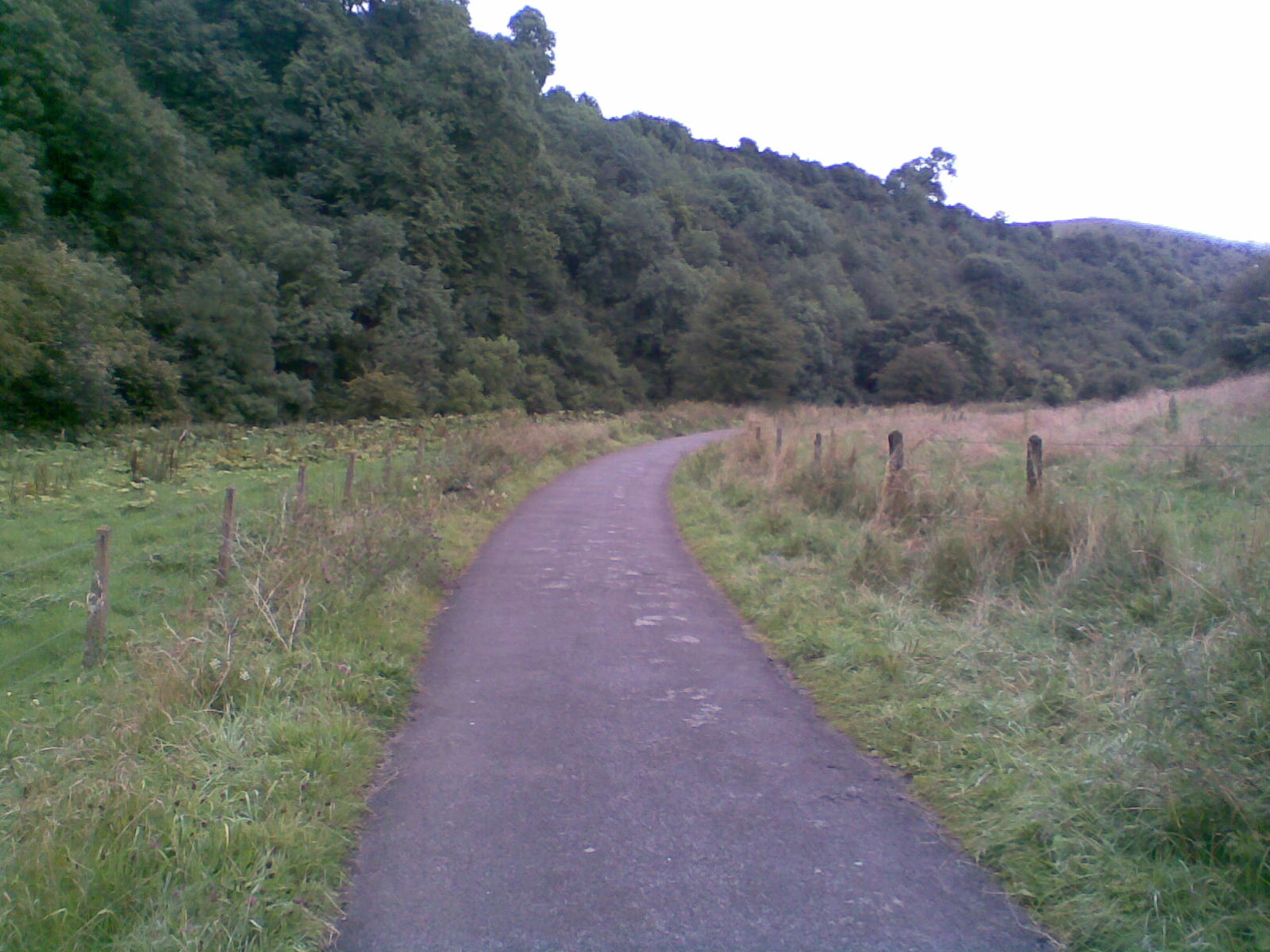
A typical view - looking south along the route today, near Wetton.

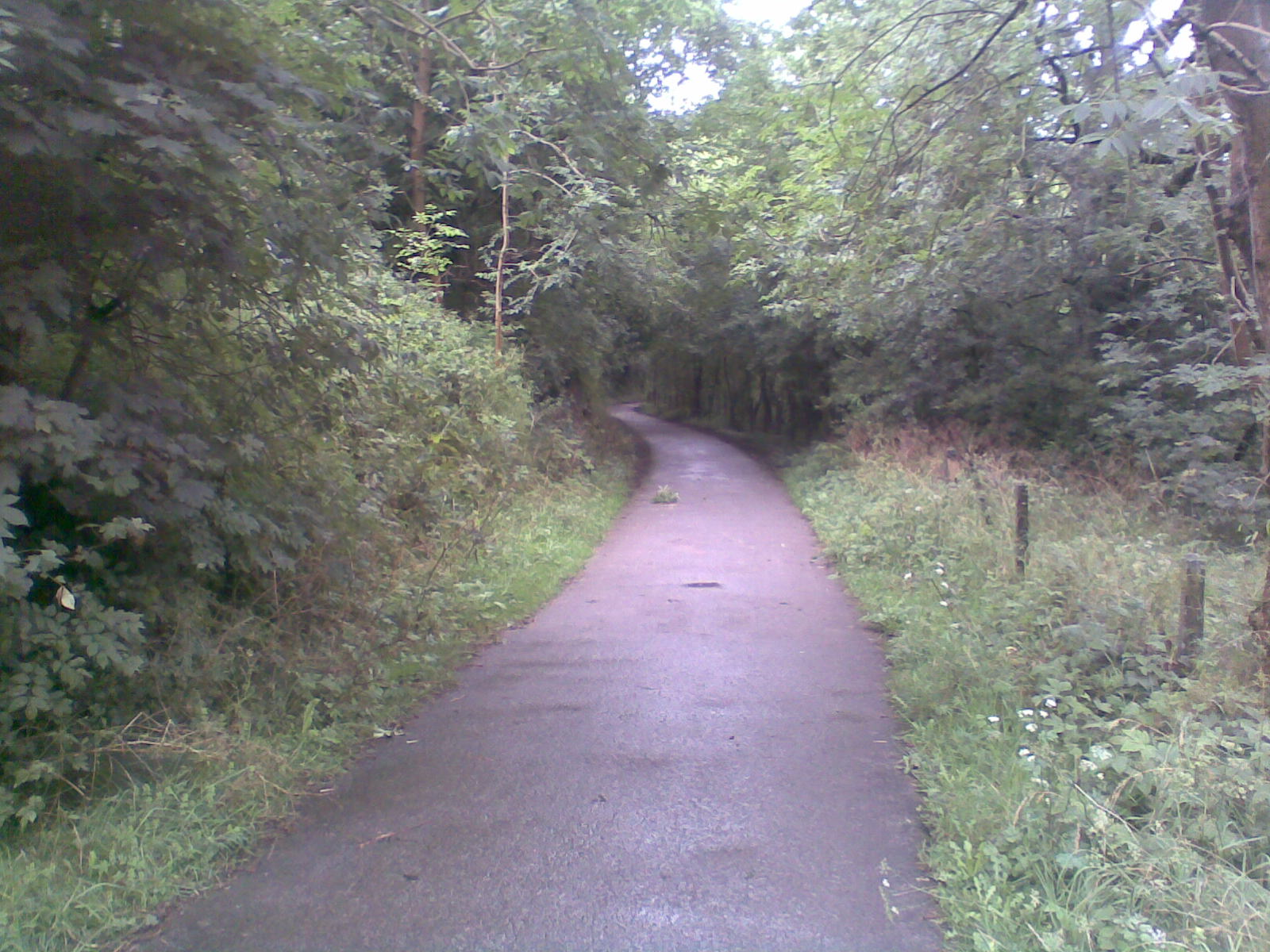
Another typical view, looking north from the same viewpoint.

== See also ==
- British narrow-gauge railways
- List of cycle routes in England
- 2 ft 6 in gauge railways
