= Beeston Tor =

Limestone cliff in Staffordshire

Coordinates: 53.08312°N 1.84470°W

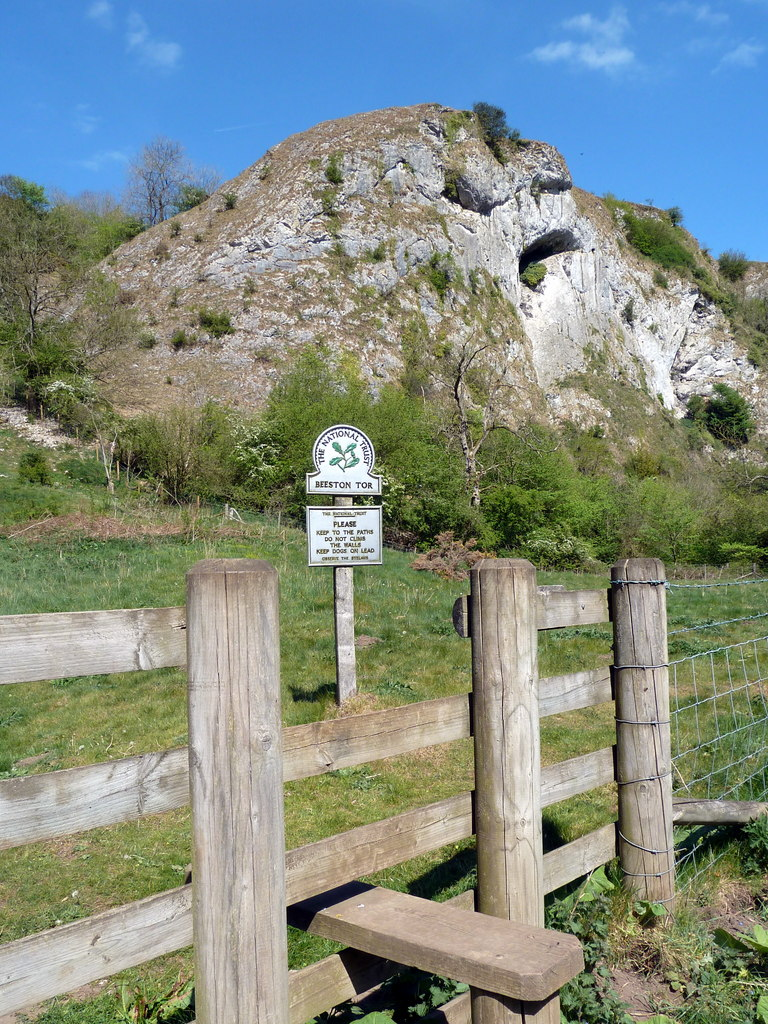
Beeston Tor, a limestone outcrop

Beeston Tor (grid reference SK105540) is a limestone cliff in Staffordshire. It overlooks the confluence of the River Hamps with the River Manifold, and is a popular venue for rock climbing (seasonal restrictions for rock climbing apply).

There are several limestone caves in and around the rock, some of them of archaeological importance. Excavations in St Bertram's Cave discovered a hoard of Saxon coins; the cave is connected vertically to Jackdaw's Cave. Hayhole, also known as The Hayloft, is the "obvious crescent-shaped opening" high on the face of the Tor. Excavation of Lynx Caves, at the same elevation, produced historical remains of lynx, polecat and reindeer.

There was a small station here, of the same name, opened by the narrow gauge (2' 6") Leek and Manifold Valley Light Railway on 27 June 1904, whilst being entirely operated by the North Staffordshire Railway. The station had no siding – unlike most of the stations on the line – but there was a refreshment room.

The line closed in 1934, and the route of the railway past the station is now designated the Manifold Way, an 8-mile walk- and cycle-path which runs from Waterhouses to Hulme End.
