= River Hamps =

River in Staffordshire, England

Hamps
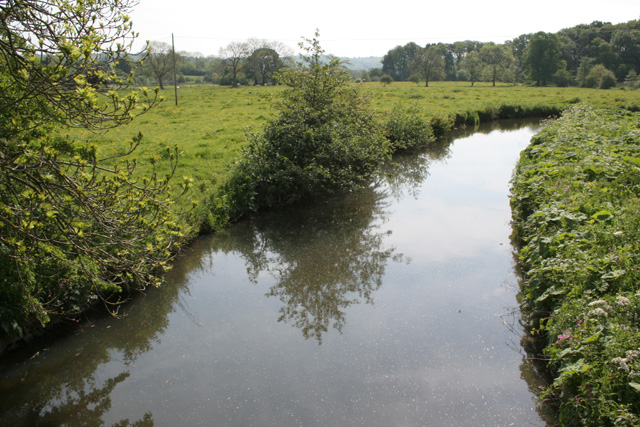
- The Hamps near Winkhill

Physical characteristics
- Source
  - location: South side of Merryton Low, east of Upper Hulme
- Mouth
  - location: Confluence with the Manifold
  - coordinates: 53.13535°N 1.95213°W

Basin features
- Progression: Manifold—Dove—Trent—Humber—North Sea

The River Hamps is a river in Staffordshire, England. It is a tributary of the River Manifold, which itself flows into the River Dove near Ilam. For much of its length the river flows through the Peak District National Park.

== Etymology ==
The name Hamps derives from its Middle English title, "Hanespe" which derives from the British name, which means "summer dry", i.e. dry in summer. This is because the river disappears underground during the summer.

== Course ==
The Hamps rises on the high moorland (grid reference SK033598), on the south side of Merryton Low, east of Upper Hulme. It flows south through the villages Onecote and Winkhill, then flows east, to Waterhouses and finally north to meet the Manifold under Beeston Tor. The woodlands of this last stretch are part of the National Trust's South Peak Estate.

From Waterhouses to the River Manifold the valley carries the track of the former Leek and Manifold Valley Light Railway, now part of the Manifold Way, an 8-mile walk- and cycle-path.

During the summer months the river disappears underground and re-emerges at Hamps Spring near Ilam. During this time the river bed from north of Waterhouses through to the confluence with the River Manifold runs dry.

In the 1960/70s there were controversial proposals to build a major new reservoir just north of Winkhill, inside the National Park. The reservoir would have been broad and relatively shallow. However, in the end these proposals were dropped in favour of the reservoir at Carsington Water.

== See also ==
- Manifold Way
