= Manifold Way =

Rail trail in Staffordshire, England

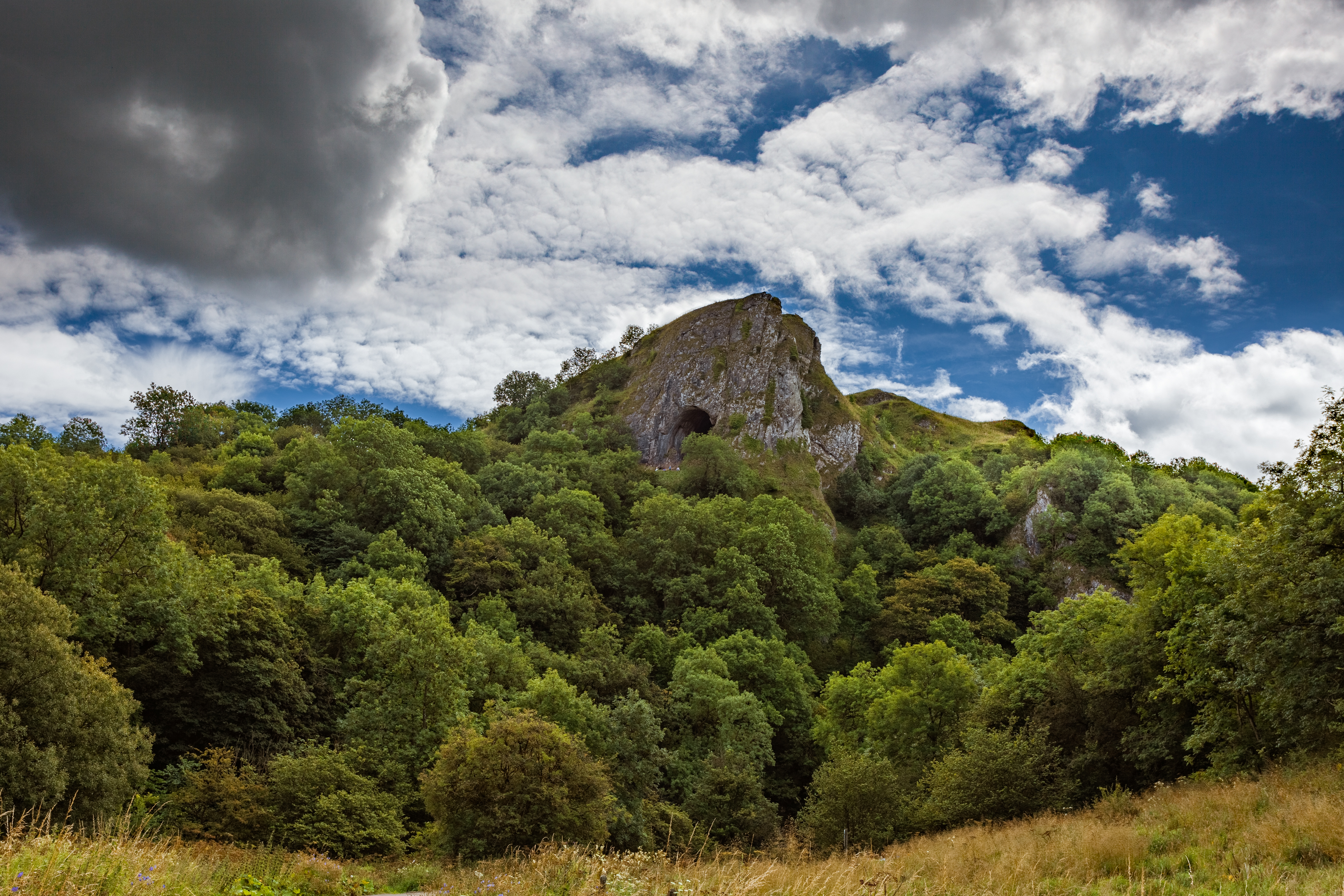
Thor's Cave, viewed from the Manifold Way

The Manifold Way is a shared-use path in Staffordshire, England. It is 8 miles (12.9 km) in length and runs from Hulme End (Note: Hulme End is located at 53.1307°N 1.8480°W) in the north to Waterhouses (Note: Waterhouses is located at: 53.0480°N 1.8654°W) in the south, mostly through the Manifold Valley and the valley of its only tributary, the River Hamps, following the route of the former Leek and Manifold Valley Light Railway, a 2 ft 6 in (762 mm) gauge line which closed in 1934 after a short life.

== History ==
The Manifold Way was opened in July 1937 by Staffordshire County Council, after the London, Midland and Scottish Railway handed over the trackbed to them. Paved throughout, and with only a slight downhill gradient from north to south, the path is also ideal for wheelchair users and prams. For about 1 1/2 miles (2.4 km) near Wetton Mill, the original route along the former railway is shared with motor traffic, on what is now a minor unclassified road has been diverted along its route; this section includes Swainsley Tunnel. However, the signed Manifold Trail is routed along the eastern bank of the river and largely avoids the on-road route.

Unlike other nearby rail trails, such as the Tissington Trail and the High Peak Trail, which cross elevated areas of the Peak District, the Manifold Way follows the valley bottoms and is altogether more sheltered. The path passes through attractive scenery, and indeed tourism was one of the reasons for the original construction of the line. Popular locations along the route include Thor's Cave, the mill at Wetton Hill and Beeston Tor. A little to the east lies Dovedale, a better-known beauty spot.

The Manifold Way does not pass through any significant centres of population; indeed it was once described by a railway worker as a line that started in the middle of nowhere,and ended up in the same place. Whilst the railway did serve villages and hamlets along its route, these were mostly located about a mile above the valley, a fact which contributed to the railway's ultimate demise.

Whilst walking along the Manifold Way the rivers Manifold and Hamps are never far away; in fact, there are dozens of small bridges crossing them. However, over the summer months, the river Manifold disappears down a swallet (or sink hole) near Wetton Mill, to reappear some distance away, at Ilam.

In all, there were ten stations and halts along the line. Most had some sort of waiting room and a siding. The sites of the halts can be seen today and there is also some evidence of the loading platforms, especially at Ecton, where the dairy provided much business for the railway.

== The trail today ==
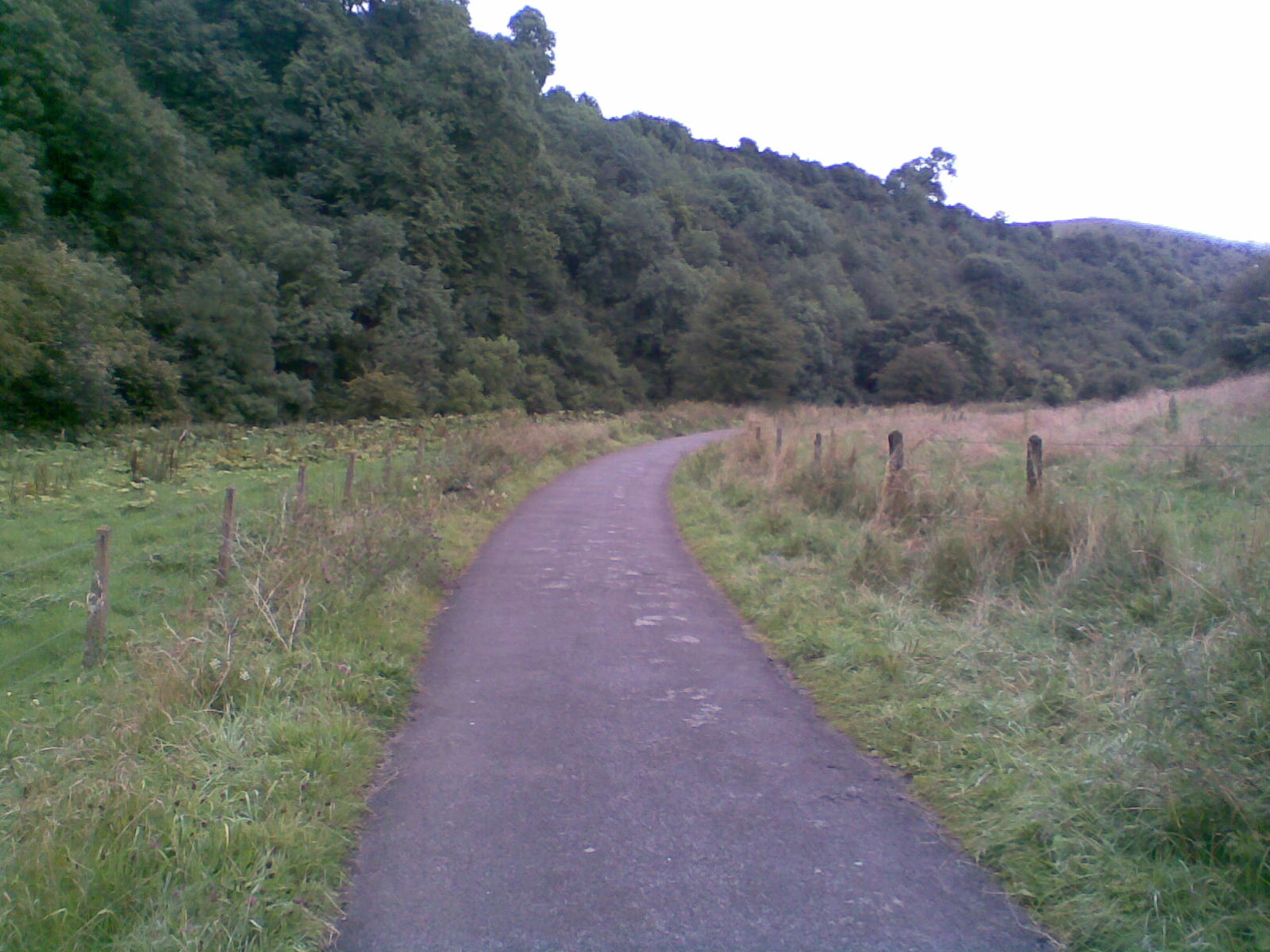
A typical view – looking south along the route today, near Wetton

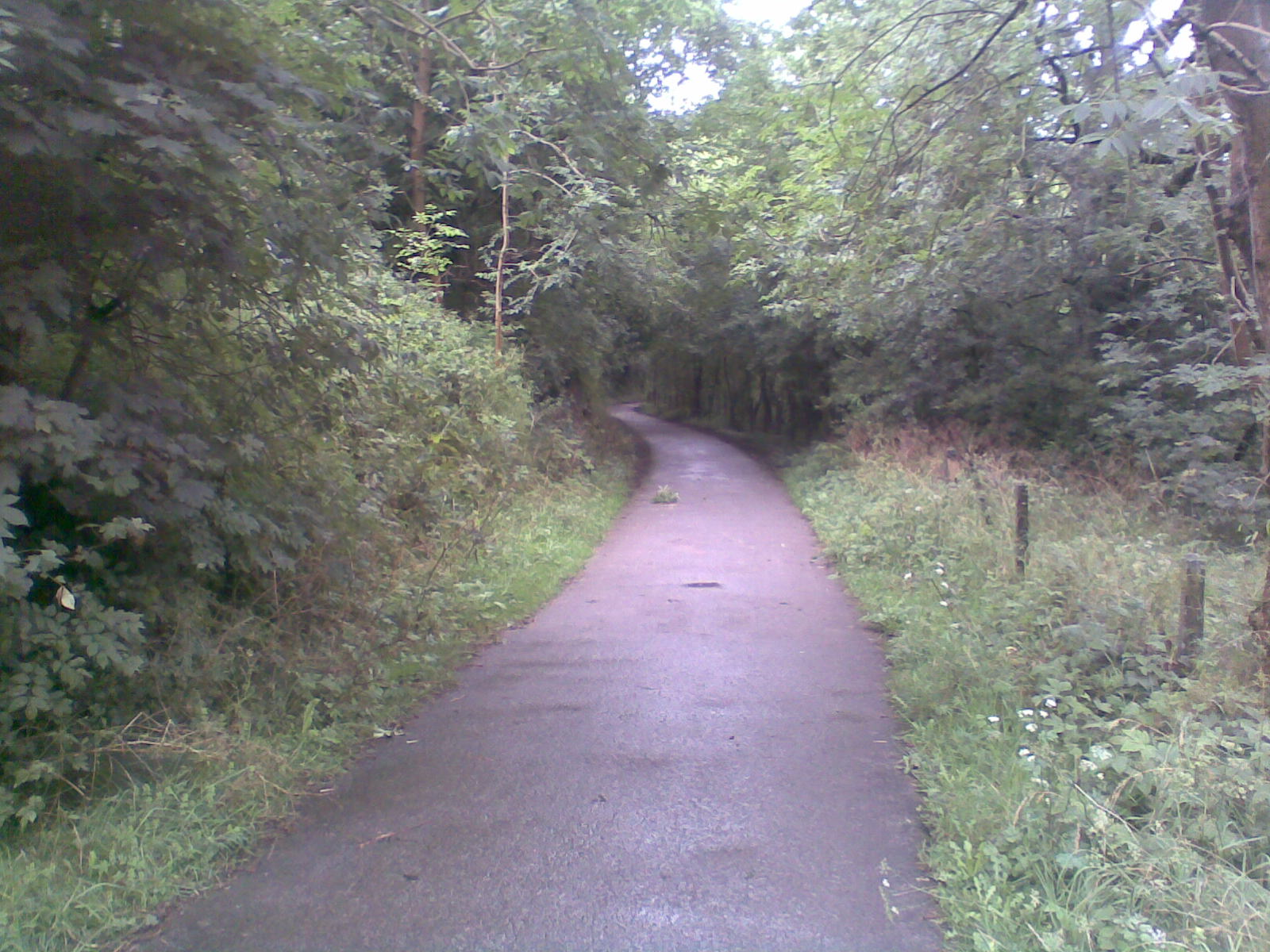
Another typical view – looking north from the same viewpoint

The valley-bottom nature of the Manifold Way offers much to see in the way of flora, fauna and animal wildlife. Apart from the official Manifold Way route itself, the area also lends itself to many circular walking routes which utilise the path.

The Manifold Way passes through some areas that comprise the South Peak Estate; these are land holdings owned by the National Trust.

At Hulme End, the former station building has been restored as a visitor centre and the café at Wetton Mill is a popular spot. At Ecton Hill lie the Ecton Mines], which are the remains of a 4,000 year-old copper mine, and the caves at Beeston Tor have revealed Neolithic and Bronze Age remains.

The former trackbed is well maintained; there are a number of car parks and refreshment facilities situated at convenient intervals along its length.

There are campsites at Hulme End and Wetton Village; bicycles can be hired at Waterhouses, at the southern end of the trail.
