= Robert Thompson =

Robert or Bob Thompson may refer to:

== Entertainment ==
- Lil RT (Robert Thompson, born 2014), American rapper
- Bob Thompson (musician, born 1924) (1924–2013), American orchestra leader, pianist, arranger, composer
- Bob Thompson (painter) (1937–1966), American figurative painter
- Bob Thompson (musician, born 1942), American jazz pianist, composer and arranger
- Bob Thompson (wine) (born 1934), American wine writer
- Robert E. Thompson (screenwriter) (1924–2004), American screenwriter
- Robert Livingstone Thompson, birth name of Dandy Livingstone (born 1943), British-Jamaican reggae musician and producer
- Robert Scott Thompson (born 1959), composer of ambient, instrumental and electroacoustic music
- Robert Thompson (bassoonist) (born 1936), American bassoonist
- Robert Thompson (dancer) (1933–1984), American dancer and choreographer

== Military ==
- Robert G. Thompson (1915–1965), American World War II hero and Communist Party USA activist
- Robert Grainger Ker Thompson (1916–1992), British soldier and counter-insurgency expert
- Robert Means Thompson (1849–1930), American naval officer
- Robert Thompson (spy) (born 1935), U.S. Air Force clerk and spy for the Soviet Union

== Politics ==
- Robert A. Thompson (1805–1876), American politician, U.S. Representative from Virginia
- Robert Adam Thompson (1860–1947), merchant, miller and politician in Ontario, Canada
- Robert F. Thompson (born 1971), American politician, Arkansas state senator
- Robert J. Thompson (1937–2006), Pennsylvania State Senator
- Robert N. Thompson (1914–1997), Canadian politician, chiropractor, and educator
- Robert Schuyler Thompson (1844–1930), businessman and politician in Manitoba, Canada
- Robert Thompson (Irish politician) (1839–1918), Irish Member of Parliament in United Kingdom of Great Britain and Ireland
- Robert Thompson (Mississippi politician) (1830–?), Mississippi state Representative
- Robert Thompson (New Zealand politician) (1840–1922), New Zealand politician
- Robert Thompson (West Virginia politician), American politician, West Virginia state delegate
- Robert Thompson (Wisconsin politician) (1927–1999), American politician, Wisconsin state assemblyman
- Robert Townshend Thompson (1792–1887), Virginia politician, lawyer and slavery opponent

== Sports ==
- Bob Thompson (footballer, born February 1890) (1890–1958), English football full back for Everton and others
- Bob Thompson (footballer, born September 1890) (1890–1969), English football forward for numerous clubs
- Bob Thompson (soccer) (born 1981), American Association football player, coach
- Robbie Thompson (born 1967), Australian rules footballer for Adelaide
- Robbie Thompson (Scottish footballer) (born 2004), Scottish footballer for Inverness Caledonian Thistle
- Robby Thompson (born 1962), American baseball player
- Robert Thompson (American football) (born 1960), American football linebacker
- Robert Thompson (Australian footballer, born 1891) (1891–1918), Australian rules footballer for University
- Robert Thompson (Australian footballer, born 1947) (1947–2018), Australian rules footballer for Essendon
- Robert Thompson (cyclist) (1884–1974), British Olympic road racing cyclist
- Robert Thompson (footballer, born 1878) (1878–19??), English footballer
- Robert Thompson (rugby, born 1869) (1869–1952), Irish rugby union player
- Robert Thompson (rugby union, born 1947) (1947–2018), New Zealander-Australian rugby union player who represented Australia
- Robert Thompson (water polo) (born 1947), Canadian water polo player and coach
- Bob Thompson (fencer) (born 1910), Northern Irish fencer

== Others ==
- Robert B. Thompson (1811–1841), British-American Latter Day Saint leader, historian, and newspaper editor
- Robert Charles Thompson (1931–1995), Canadian-American mathematician
- Robert E. Thompson (journalist) (1921–2003), American political writer and journalist
- Robert Farris Thompson (1932–2021), American art historian, writer, professor
- Robert H. Thompson (1944–2017), British numismatist
- Robert Thompson (born 1982), a 10-year-old perpetrator in the murder of James Bulger
- Robert Thompson (chef) (born 1981), British Michelin-starred chef
- Robert Thompson (designer) (1876–1955), British furniture maker
- Robert Thompson (media scholar) (born 1959), American media historian
- Robert Thompson (poker director), American poker official in Las Vegas
- Robert Thompson (priest), Irish Dean of Ardfert from 1959 until 1966

== See also ==
- Rob Thompson (disambiguation)
- Bobby Thompson (disambiguation)
- Bert Thompson (disambiguation)
- Robert Thomson (disambiguation)
