= Dodgson =

Dodgson is a surname. Its origin is "son of Roger", "Dodge" being a mediaeval nickname for Roger, as were Rodge and Hodge.

- Campbell Dodgson (1867–1948), British art historian and museum curator
- Catharine Dodgson (1883–1954), British artist
- Charles Dodgson (bishop) (c.1722–1795), Anglican Bishop of Elphin
- Charles Dodgson (priest) (1800–1868), Anglican Archdeacon of Richmond
- Charles Lutwidge Dodgson, English mathematician, logician, clergyman, photographer and author, better known by his pen name of Lewis Carroll.
- Edwin Heron Dodgson, youngest brother of the above, Church of England clergyman and missionary
- Elyse Dodgson (1945–2018), British theatre producer
- George Haydock Dodgson (1811–1880), English watercolour artist
- Lewis Dodgson, a fictional minor character in the novel Jurassic Park
- Mark Dodgson (born 1957), Australian academic and author
- Neil Dodgson (born 1966), British computer scientist
- Stephen Dodgson (1924–2013), British composer

Dodgson is also a given name, following the practice of using an ancestor's surname as a child's given name.

- Dodgson Hamilton Madden, Irish Unionist Member of Parliament (1887-92)
- George Dodgson Callow (1829–1875), English painter
- John Dodgson Barrow, American landscape painter

== See also ==
- Dodgson condensation, mathematical method named after its inventor, Charles Lutwidge Dodgson.
