= Robert Thomson =

Robert, Rob, Robbie, Bob or Bobby Thomson may refer to:

== Science and medicine ==
- Robert Thomson (physician) (1810–1864), Scottish physician, academic, and author
- Robert Tatlock Thomson (1856–1950), British chemist and public analyst
- Robert Stevenson Thomson (1858–1905), British physician

== Sports ==
=== Association football (soccer) ===
- Bob Thomson (1890–1971), English footballer for Chelsea
- Robert Thomson (footballer, born 1890) (1890–?), Scottish footballer for Huddersfield Town
- Robert Thomson (footballer, born 1903) (1903–?), Scottish footballer for Falkirk, Sunderland, Newcastle, Hull, Ipswich and Scotland
- Bertie Thomson (Robert Austin Thomson, 1907–1937), Scottish footballer for Celtic, Blackpool, Motherwell and Scotland
- Bobby Thomson (footballer, born 1937) (1937–2024), Scottish footballer for Aston Villa and Birmingham City
- Bobby Thomson (footballer, born 1939), Scottish footballer (Partick Thistle, Liverpool FC, Luton Town)
- Bobby Thomson (footballer, born 1943) (1943–2009), English footballer
- Bobby Thomson (footballer, born 1955), Scottish footballer (Hibernian, Blackpool FC)
- Robert Thomson (footballer, born 1993), Scottish footballer
- Robbie Thomson (born 1993), Scottish footballer

=== Other sports ===
- Robert Thomson (golfer) (1875–1954), Scottish golfer
- Bobby Thomson (1923–2010), American baseball player who hit "The Shot Heard Round the World"
- Rob Thomson (born 1963), Canadian baseball manager
- Robert Thomson (basketball) (born 1982), Rwandan basketball player
- Robert Thomson (cyclist), cyclist, yachter, and longboarder from New Zealand

== Others ==
- Robert Thomson (Australian politician) (1807–1863), member of the Victorian Legislative Council
- Robert Thomson (British Army officer) (born 1967), British general
- Robert Thomson (executive) (born 1961), Australian media executive and journalist
- Robert B. Thomson, New Zealand Antarctic explorer in the 1960s
- Robert W. Thomson (1934–2018), English philologist
- Robert William Thomson (1822–1873), Scottish inventor

== See also ==
- Robert Thompson (disambiguation)
- Bobby Thompson (disambiguation)
- Bert Thomson (disambiguation)
