= Gambart =

Gambart may refer to:

- Ernest Gambart, French-born artist and print publisher in London
- Jean-Félix Adolphe Gambart, French astronomer
- Gambart (crater), named after Jean-Félix Adolphe Gambart
