= Robert Rattray Tatlock =

Robert Rattray Tatlock (1889–1954) was a Scottish writer and art critic.

== Early career ==
Born at 34 Gray Street in Glasgow on 25 January 1889, his parents were Hannah Tatlock (née Butterworth) and John Tatlock, of Baird & Tatlock, who manufactured scientific instruments and was also a chemical merchant. The family lived at 34 Gray Street in Glasgow near the River Kelvin.

Tatlock attended both The Glasgow Academy and the Royal College of Science and Technology, the latter of which is now the University of Strathclyde. Between 1910 and 1913 he studied painting and drawing at the Glasgow School of Art, though evening classes.

== Military service ==
Tatlock served in a Quaker organisation, the Friends War Victims Relief Committee, which had been formed in 1870. During this period of service he worked in both Russia and France.

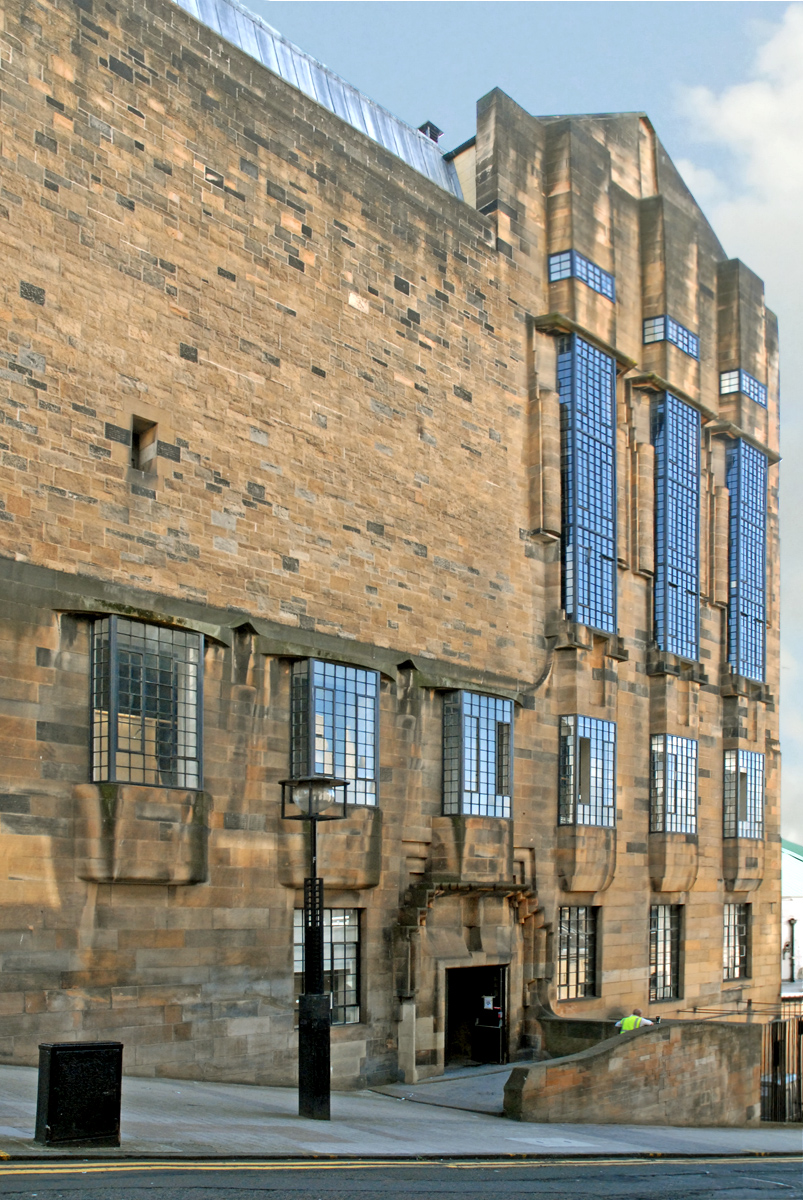
Glasgow School of Art West elevation

== Later life ==
Between 1920 and 1933 he worked as the editor of The Burlington Magazine, an academic journal covering the fine and decorative arts, and which is now the longest running English language art journal. During the Second World War, both Roger Fry and Campbell Dodgson made a significant effort ensure that the Burlington survived. Tatlock's time as editor saw an increase both in circulation, and in the number of adverts. This gave the magazine a greater degree of financial stability.

Tatlock was an art writer as well as an editor, and was the chief art critic for The Daily Telegraph between 1924 and 1934. His work also appeared in The Contemporary Review and the New Statesman. He was a proponent of greater recognition of the importance of art, and also a greater acceptance of modern art.

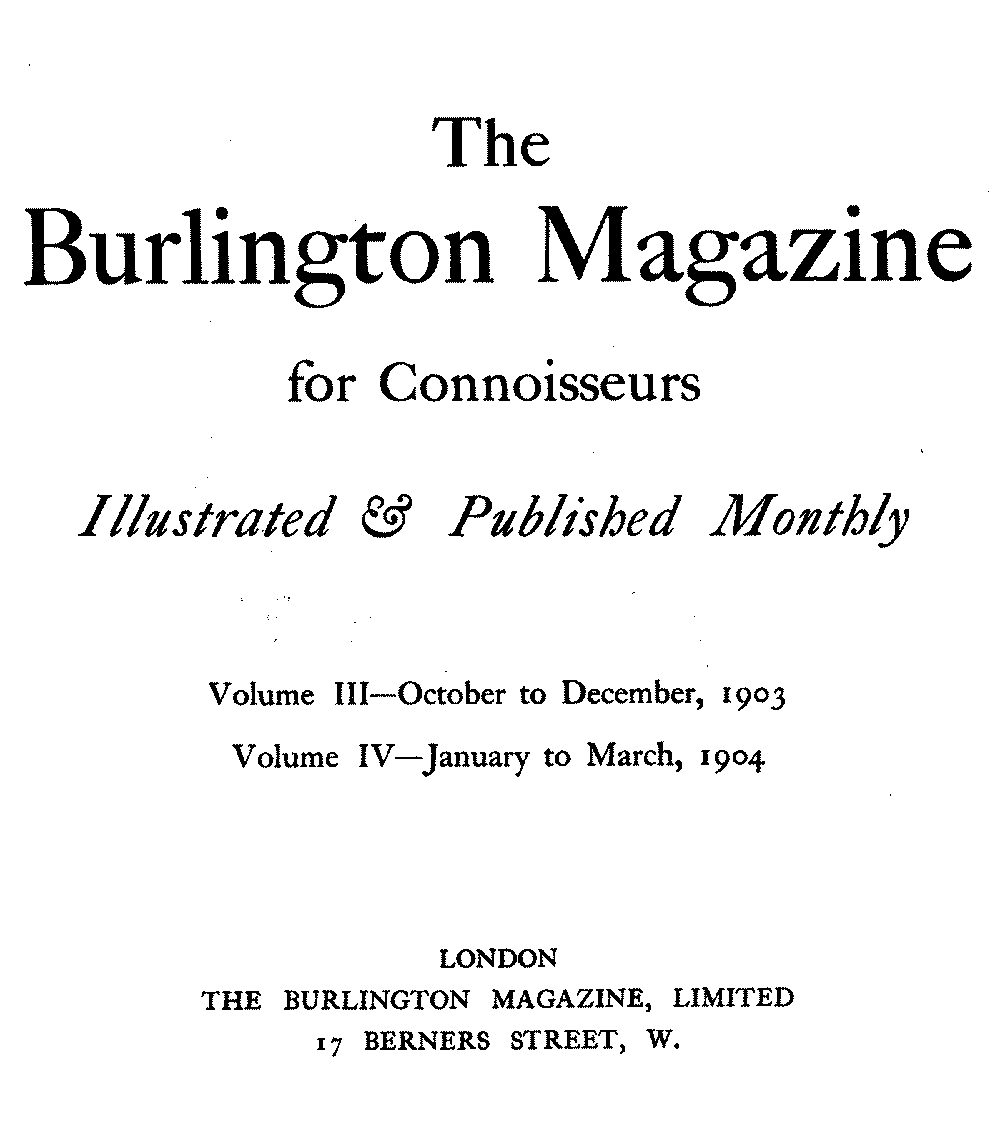
The Burlington Magazine (1903-) holds a particular interest in Renaissance art.

In 1924 he married the artist Cicely Hey. He died in Essex on 29 June 1954.

Robert R Tatlock is listed on the Glasgow School of Art's First World War Roll of Honour.

== Publications ==
- A Short History of Art from Prehistoric Times to the Present Day (1900)
- Spanish Art (1927)

== Family ==
He was nephew to the Glasgow City Analyst (and named after), Robert Rattray Tatlock and a cousin to the younger analyst, Robert Tatlock Thomson FRSE.
