= Ernest Wood (disambiguation) =

Ernest Wood (1883–1965) was an English yogi, theosophist, Sanskrit scholar, and author.

Ernest Wood may also refer to:

- Ernest M. Wood (1863–1956), architect based in Quincy, Illinois
- Ernest Wood (actor) (died 1942), American stage and screen actor
- Ernest E. Wood (1875–1952), U.S. Representative from Missouri
- Ernest Wood (Manitoba politician) (1862–?), English-born farmer and political figure in Manitoba
