= 1186 Turnera =

Eoan asteroid

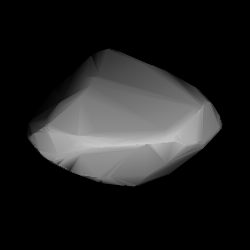
- Shape model of Turnera from its lightcurve

Discovery
- Discovered by: C. Jackson
- Discovery site: Johannesburg Obs.
- Discovery date: 1 August 1929

Designations
- Named after: Herbert Hall Turner (British astronomer)
- Alternative designations: 1929 PL · 1930 UO; 1930 WL · 1932 CC; A919 SE
- Minor planet category: main-belt · (outer); Eos

Orbital characteristics
- Epoch 4 September 2017 (JD 2458000.5)
- Uncertainty parameter 0
- Observation arc: 87.93 yr (32,115 days)
- Aphelion: 3.3314 AU
- Perihelion: 2.7190 AU
- Semi-major axis: 3.0252 AU
- Eccentricity: 0.1012
- Orbital period (sidereal): 5.26 yr (1,922 days)
- Mean anomaly: 252.20°
- Mean motion: 0° 11^{m} 14.28^{s} / day
- Inclination: 10.752°
- Longitude of ascending node: 42.988°
- Argument of perihelion: 295.00°

Physical characteristics
- Dimensions: 34.290±0.275 km 35.56±2.0 km 37.17±7.78 km 39.06±0.57 km 39.19±1.25 km 39.691±0.354 km
- Synodic rotation period: 12.010 h 12.066±0.004 h (Note: Lightcurve plot of 1186 Turnera, Palmer Divide Observatory, Brian D. Warner (2006)); 12.085±0.001 h 15±2 h
- Geometric albedo: 0.12±0.04; 0.2350±0.0371; 0.240±0.026; 0.247±0.008; 0.2919±0.036
- Spectral type: S (Tholen) · S Sq (SMASS); B–V = 0.790; U–B = 0.430
- Absolute magnitude (H): 9.20; 9.90±0.38

1186 Turnera, provisional designation 1929 PL, is a stony Eoan asteroid from the outer regions of the asteroid belt, approximately 36 kilometers in diameter. It was discovered on 1 August 1929, by South African astronomer Cyril Jackson at the Union Observatory in Johannesburg. The asteroid was later named after British astronomer Herbert Hall Turner.

== Classification and orbit ==
Turnera is a member of the Eos family (606), the largest asteroid family in the outer main-belt with nearly 10,000 known members. It orbits the Sun at a distance of 2.7–3.3 AU once every 5 years and 3 months (1,922 days). Its orbit has an eccentricity of 0.10 and an inclination of 11° with respect to the ecliptic. Turnera was first identified as 1919 SE at Simeiz Observatory in September 1919. This observation, however, remains unused and the body's observation arc begins at Johannesburg with its official discovery observation in 1929.

== Physical characteristics ==
In the Tholen classification, Turnera is a common, stony S-type asteroid. In the SMASS classification, it is a Sq-type that transitions to the Q-type asteroids. Generically, Eoan asteroids are also characterized as K-type asteroids with an albedo of 0.13.

=== Lightcurves ===
In January 2016, the best-rated rotational lightcurve of Turnera was obtained from photometric observations by the Spanish amateur astronomer group OBAS, Observadores de Asteroids. Lightcurve analysis gave a well-defined rotation period of 12.085 hours with a brightness variation of 0.31 magnitude (U=3). Previously, American astronomer Brian Warner obtained a similar period of 12.066 hours and an amplitude of 0.34 magnitude at his Palmer Divide Observatory (716) in Colorado (U=2+).

Other lightcurve observations were made by French amateur astronomer Laurent Bernasconi (15±2 hours; Δmag of 0.25; U=2+) in February 2006, and by Italian astronomer Maria A. Barucci (12.010 hours; Δmag of 0.20; U=2) in August 1987.

=== Diameter and albedo ===
According to the surveys carried out by the Infrared Astronomical Satellite IRAS, the Japanese Akari satellite, and the NEOWISE mission of NASA's Wide-field Infrared Survey Explorer, Turnera measures between 34.290 and 39.691 kilometers in diameter and its surface has an albedo between 0.12 and 0.2919.

The Collaborative Asteroid Lightcurve Link adopts the results obtained by IRAS, that is, an albedo of 0.2919 and a diameter of 35.56 kilometers with an absolute magnitude of 9.20.

=== Naming ===
This minor planet was named after British astronomer Herbert Hall Turner (1861–1930), director of the Radcliffe Observatory at University of Oxford. He is also credited with coining the term "parsec". The official naming citation was published in Paul Herget's The Names of the Minor Planets in 1955 (H 110).
