= Beeston Tor railway station =

Disused railway station in Staffordshire, England

Beeston Tor
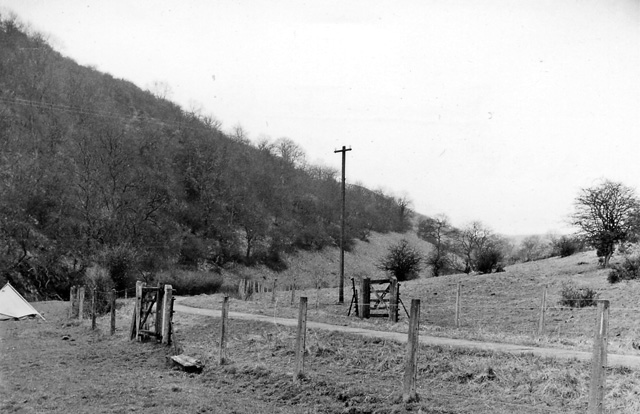
- The site of the station in 1962

General information
- Location: Grindon, Staffordshire Moorlands; England
- Coordinates: 53.0828°N 1.8464°W
- Platforms: 1

Other information
- Status: Disused

History
- Original company: Leek and Manifold Light Railway
- Post-grouping: London, Midland and Scottish Railway

Key dates
- 29 June 1904: Opened
- 12 March 1934: Closed
Location

Beeston Tor was a railway station which served the Beeston Tor and village of Grindon in Staffordshire, England. It opened in 1904 and closed in 1934 The site is now part of the Manifold Way.

== Route ==
Preceding station	Historical railways	Following station
Sparrowlee	Leek and Manifold Valley Light Railway	Grindon
