= Ernest Wood (Manitoba politician) =

Canadian politician

Ernest Jameson Wood (September 2, 1862 – after 1897) was an English-born farmer and political figure in Manitoba. He represented Cypress from 1888 to 1892 in the Legislative Assembly of Manitoba as a Conservative.

He was born in Stoke, the son of Reverend Wood, the rector at Grindon. In 1889, he married Evelyn Louise Jones. Wood was defeated when he ran for reelection to the Manitoba assembly in 1892. Later that year, he was named an agent for the Manitoba government stationed in Birmingham to promote immigration. After this appointment ended in 1897, he trained as a clergyman at Lichfield Theological College.
