= Bobby Thompson =

Bobby Thompson may refer to:

- Bobby Thompson (American football coach) (born 1937), American football coach and college athletics administrator
- Bobby Thompson (running back) (born 1947), former NFL and CFL running back
- Bobby Thompson (defensive back) (1939–2014), NFL and CFL defensive back
- Bobby Thompson (tackle) (1959–2005), Canadian football player
- Bobby Thompson (baseball) (1953–2011), American Major League outfielder
- Bobby Thompson (comedian) (1911–1988), British stand-up comedian, actor and entertainer
- Bobby Thompson (musician) (1937–2005), American banjoist
- Bobby Thompson (strongman) (born 1994), American strongman
- Bobby Thompson (racing driver) (born 1996), British racing driver
- Bobby Thompson, alias of John Donald Cody, former attorney and convicted scam artist associated with the fraudulent United States Navy Veterans Association

== See also ==
- Robert Thompson (disambiguation)
- Robert Thomson (disambiguation)
