= Listed buildings in Grindon, Staffordshire =

Grindon is a civil parish in the district of Staffordshire Moorlands, Staffordshire, England. It contains 30 listed buildings that are recorded in the National Heritage List for England. All the listed buildings are designated at Grade II, the lowest of the three grades, which is applied to "buildings of national importance and special interest". The parish contains the village of Grindon and is otherwise rural. Most of the listed buildings are houses, farmhouses and farm buildings. The other listed buildings include a church and items in the churchyard, two bridges, a former lime kiln, and an obelisk and memorial.

== Buildings ==
Name and location	Photograph	Date	Notes
Manor Farmhouse; 53.08308°N 1.87349°W	—	16th or 17th century (probable)	The farmhouse, which has internal cruck construction, was later altered and extended. The external walls are in limestone, and the roof is tiled. The farmhouse originally had a T-shaped plan consisting of a two-bay hall range and a gabled two-bay cross-wing. The hall range was later extended and a rear extension was added. There are two storeys, a hall range of three bays, and the windows are casements, some of which have retained their mullions. Inside, there is a raised cruck truss.
The Old School House; 53.08332°N 1.90715°W	—	1605	Probably the remodelling of an earlier house, and remodelled later again, it has internal cruck construction, external walls in stone, and a tile roof. There are two storeys and three bays. The central doorway has a cambered head and panelled spandrels. Most of the windows are 20th-century casements, there is a 17th-century loop, and a 17th-century mullioned window in the left gable end. Inside, there are two curved cruck trusses.
Oxclose Farmhouse; 53.09475°N 1.88452°W	—	Early 17th century	The farmhouse, which has been altered and extended, is in stone with a tile roof. There are two storeys, four bays, and a rear wing. Most of the windows have chamfered mullions and hood moulds.
Coxen Green Farmhouse; 53.10242°N 1.89013°W	—	Mid-17th century	The farmhouse is in limestone with quoins, and a tile roof with coped verges. There are two storeys and an L-shaped plan, consisting of a main range and a rear wing. The doorway has a moulded surround and a lintel with a date which is now indecipherable. The windows are casements with mullions.
Dalefields and Outbuildings; 53.08649°N 1.86908°W		17th century	The house and attached former agricultural building are in stone and have a tile roof. The house to the left has two storeys, a projecting lean-to the left, and it contains casement windows. The other building is lower, with one storey, and it contains a doorway.
Ford Old Hall; 53.08309°N 1.90457°W		17th century	The house is in stone with internal cruck construction, and has quoins and a tile roof. There are two storeys, and the house consists of a projecting gabled hall range flanked by a service bay to the west and a parlour bay to the east. The doorway has a chamfered surround and lintel, and the windows have chamfered mullions and hood moulds. Inside the house are two cruck trusses.
Hillsdale Hall; 53.09609°N 1.88318°W	—	Mid-17th century	A stone farmhouse with quoins, and a tile roof with coped verges. There are two storeys and an attic, and an L-shaped plan. The doorway has a heavy lintel and a hood mould, and the windows are casements with chamfered mullions.
Memorial south of All Saints Church; 53.08784°N 1.87376°W	—	17th century	The memorial in the churchyard is a chest tomb in stone. It has an oblong plan, the underlip of the lid is chamfered, and there is no inscription.
Onecote Old Hall; 53.09563°N 1.92359°W	—	17th century	The house, which has been extended, is in stone. There are two storeys and an attic, and an irregular plan. Originally a two-bay hall range and a cross-wing, there have been additions of another gabled wing, a single-storey extension, and a lean-to. Most of the windows are casements, and some have retained their mullions. Inside, there is a timber framed wall.
Outbuilding north-northeast of Rectory; 53.08763°N 1.87305°W	—	17th century (probable)	A house, later used for other purposes, is in stone with quoins, and has a tile roof with coped verges. There are two storeys, a main range of three bays, and a gabled left wing. In the centre is a stable door with a dated lintel, and the windows have chamfered mullions. There is a garage door to the right and a central loft opening.
Cartshed, stables and granary northwest of Coxen Green Farmhouse; 53.10260°N 1.89030°W	—	1652	The farm building is in limestone with quoins, and a tile roof with coped verges. There are two levels and four bays. The building contains a central cart entry, stable doors, a small window, and loft openings. There are external steps on the front and on the east gable end.
Cawbrook Farmhouse; 53.08678°N 1.86792°W		Late 17th or early 18th century	The farmhouse, later a private house, was remodelled in the 19th century. It is in limestone with gritstone dressings, and has a tile roof with copings. There are two storeys and a symmetrical front of three bays. The central doorway has a flat moulded hood, and the windows are casements, those on the front with lintels.
Ford House Farmhouse and Ford Hall Farmhouse; 53.08325°N 1.90581°W	—	Early 18th century	A pair of farmhouses in sandstone, with quoins, a string course, an eaves band, a cornice, and a tile roof. There are two storeys and attics, five bays, and rear extensions. The doorways have quoined surrounds and plain lintels. Ford Hall Farmhouse, on the right, has sash windows, and the windows in Ford House Farmhouse are 20th-century casements. At the rear are mullioned windows, some blocked.
Stables and hayloft north-northwest of Coxen Green Farmhouse; 53.10251°N 1.89053°W	—	18th century (probable)	The farm building is in stone with quoins, and a tile roof with coped verges. There are two levels, and the building contains top-opening windows, a sliding door and other doors, and square loft openings.
Grindley Croft; 53.08674°N 1.86972°W		18th century (probable)	A house and attached agricultural building, it is in stone and has a tile roof with coped verges to the east. The house is to the east and has two storeys and two bays. The door is to the right and the windows have two lights and mullions. In the west gable end of the agricultural building is a window and a loft opening.
Ladyside; 53.09208°N 1.86611°W		18th century	A stone farmhouse with quoins, and a tile roof with coped verges on kneelers. There are two storeys and an L-shaped plan, consisting of a three-bay main range and a rear wing. The doorway and the windows, which are mullioned, have hood moulds.
Oldfield Farm; 53.07420°N 1.87943°W	—	18th century	The farmhouse is in limestone with sandstone dressings, quoins, and a tile roof with coped verges on kneelers. There are three storeys, three bays and a rear extension. The central doorway has a square head, the window above it is circular, the window over that has a semicircular head, and the other windows are mullioned. At the rear is a three-storey stair window with transoms.
Barn and stable west of Stoop Farm; 53.08326°N 1.90430°W	—	18th century (probable)	The barn and stable are in stone with quoins and a tile roof. There are two levels, and the building contains full-height barn doors, a window, a stable door, vent slits, and loft openings.
William Herton Memorial and railings 53.08783°N 1.87345°W	—	1822	The memorial is in the churchyard of All Saints Church and is to the memory of William Herton. It is a pedestal tomb in stone and has a square plan. The tomb has fluted corner pilasters, a moulded base and cornice, it is capped by a fluted urn, and enclosed by wrought iron railings.
Limekiln east of Coxen Green Farmhouse; 53.10226°N 1.88870°W	—	Early 19th century (probable)	The former limekiln is in limestone. It has a roughly semicircular plan, and in the south side is a segmental-headed stoke hole.
Darfar Bridge; 53.09901°N 1.85749°W		Early 19th century	The bridge carries a road over the River Manifold. It is in stone and consists of a single semi-elliptical arch. The bridge has a moulded string course and a coped parapet rising to the centre of the bridge.
Stoop Farm; 53.08319°N 1.90401°W	—	Early 19th century (probable)	The farmhouse is in limestone with quoins and a tile roof. There are two storeys, four bays, and a lean-to extension on the left. The doorway has a cambered head and a hood mould, and the windows are casements, some with mullions.
Weags Bridge; 53.08458°N 1.85196°W		Early 19th century (probable)	The bridge carries a road over the River Manifold. It is in stone and consists of a single semicircular arch. The bridge has a parapet rising to a point over the arch.
Barn, stables and hayloft 20 yards west of Ford House; 53.08322°N 1.90640°W	—	Early to mid-19th century	The building is in stone with quoins and a tile roof. It contains full-height barn doors, top-opening windows, stable doors, vent slits, and a square pitching hole.
Stables and hayloft 50 yards west of Ford House; 53.08320°N 1.90672°W	—	Early to mid-19th century	The building is in stone with quoins and a tile roof. It contains a blocked door, a square pitching hole, and four vent slits. To the left is a low two-storey extension.
The Old Rectory; 53.08749°N 1.87324°W	—	c. 1840	The rectory, later a private house, is in limestone, with rusticated quoins and a tile roof. There are two storeys, two parallel ranges, and three bays. In the centre is a two-storey bay window, flanked by a single-storey canted bay window on each side. Each bay window has a moulded cornice and a shaped and coped parapet. In the upper floor are sash windows.
All Saints Church; 53.08796°N 1.87380°W		1843	The church is in sandstone with slate roofs, and consists of a nave, north and south aisles, a south porch, a chancel with a north vestry, and a west steeple. The steeple has a tower with three stages, a semi-octagonal stair tower on the south, a west doorway, and a broach spire with lucarnes. On each side of the gabled porch is a grotesque.
Mayfurlong; 53.08009°N 1.87298°W	—	1844	The farmhouse is in sandstone on a projecting plinth, and has bands and a tile roof. There are three storeys and three bays. The doorway has a moulded hood, and it is flanked by two-storey canted bay windows. The other windows are casements, and in the centre of the house is a datestone.
Gate piers, All Saints Church; 53.08757°N 1.87395°W	—	c. 1845	The gate piers at the entrance to the churchyard are stone and have a square section. Each pier has a moulded base, chamfered edges, and caps with three tiers and ornamental gablets. On each pier is a carved shield, the left with the monogram IHS, and the other with cross keys.
Obelisk and Memorial; 53.08736°N 1.87403°W		1862	The structure is to the south of All Saints Church, it is in stone and about 4 feet (1.2 m) high. It consists of a pillar with a square section tapering slightly and with a pyramidal cap. On the north and south sides are inscriptions.
