= Herbert Hall Turner =

British astronomer and seismologist (1861–1930)

Herbert Hall Turner FRS
- Turner in 1918
- Born: 13 August 1861; Leeds, England
- Died: 20 August 1930 (aged 69); Stockholm, Sweden
- Awards: Bruce Medal (1927)
- Scientific career
- Fields: Astronomy; seismology

Herbert Hall Turner FRS (13 August 1861 – 20 August 1930) was a British astronomer and seismologist.

== Biography ==
Herbert Hall Turner was educated at the Leeds Modern School, Clifton College, Bristol and Trinity College, Cambridge. In 1884 he accepted the post of Chief Assistant at the Royal Greenwich Observatory and stayed there for nine years. In 1893 he became Savilian Professor of Astronomy and Director of the Radcliffe Observatory at Oxford University, a post he held for 37 years until his sudden death in 1930.

He was one of the observers in the Eclipse Expeditions of 1886 and 1887. In seismology, he is credited with the discovery of deep focus earthquakes. He is also credited with coining the word parsec.

His 1897 Royal Society candidature citation read:

Secretary of the Royal Astronomical Society. Was Chief Assistant at the Royal Observatory, Greenwich 1884-1894. Author of various papers among which may be mentioned:-

- "On the correction of the Equilibrium theory of tides for the continents" (with G H Darwin, Proc.RS. vol lx)
- "Report of observations of total solar eclipse of Aug 29 1886" (Phil Trans. vol 180A),
- "On Mr Edgeworth's method of reducing observations relating to several quantities" (Phil. Mag. Vol24).
- "On Mr Leath's Intersects" (Monthly Notices R.A.S. vol xlvi).
- "On observations for coincidence of collimators at Royal Observatory Greenwich" (M, N. Vols xlv and liii).
- "On the variations of level against of the Transit Circle at Royal Observatory Greenwich" (M.N. Vol.xlvii).
- "On the longitude of Paris" (M.N. vol li).
- "On stellar Photography" (M.N. Vols xlix and liv)
- "On the R-D discordnace" (M.N. vol Liii p. 374 and 424, vol Liv p. 486, Mem Part. 3. vol ii);
- "On new forms of levels" (M.N. Vol Lii).
- "Conference of the Cape (1880) and Greenwich (1880) Star Catalogues" (Mem. Rs.F.S, vol Li).
- "On the reduction of measures of photographic plates" (N.N. vol LiV)

Turner at the Fourth Conference International Union for Cooperation in Solar Research at Mount Wilson Observatory, 1910

He co-edited the first official history of the Royal Astronomical Society along with John Louis Emil Dreyer, History of the Royal Astronomical Society 1820–1920 (1923, reprinted 1987).

He died of a brain haemorrhage in 1930 at a conference in Stockholm. He had married Agnes Margaret Whyte in 1899; they had one daughter, Ruth.

A few months before Turner's death in 1930, the Lowell Observatory announced the discovery of a new planet, and an eleven-year-old Oxford schoolgirl, Venetia Burney, proposed the name Pluto for it to her grandfather Falconer Madan, who was retired from the Bodleian Library. Madan passed the name to Turner, who cabled it to colleagues at the Lowell Observatory in the United States. The new planet was officially named "Pluto" on 24 March 1930.

His portrait, by Catharine Dodgson, hangs at New College, Oxford, at which he held a Professorial Fellowship attached to the Savilian Professor of Astronomy.

== Honours ==
- Savilian Professor of Astronomy in the University of Oxford
- Foundation Scholar of Trinity College, Cambridge
- 1st Class Math, with Exhibition, and 1st Class Physics, with Amott Exhibition and Medal, University of London, 1880
- Mathematical Scholarship and 1st Class Experimental Physics, University of London, 1882
- Second Wrangler and Sheepshanks Astronomical Exhibitioner, Cambridge, 1882
- 1st Class Math. Tripos, 3rd part, and 2nd Smith's Prize
- Fellow of Trinity. F.R.A.S.
- Chief Assistant at Greenwich Observatory.
- Fellow of the Royal Society, June 1897

=== Lectures ===
In 1906 he delivered the Wilde lecture to the Manchester Literary & Philosophical Society. In 1913 and 1915 he was invited to deliver the Royal Institution Christmas Lecture on A Voyage in Space and Wireless Messages from the Stars.

=== Awards ===
- Bruce Medal (1927)

=== Named after him ===
- The crater Turner on the Moon
- Asteroid 1186 Turnera

=== Works ===
- Astronomical Discovery Gutenberg ebook with plates, originally published 1904.
