= Rob Thompson =

Rob Thompson may refer to:

- Rob Thompson (director), American television director, producer and screenwriter
- Rob Thompson (rugby union), New Zealand rugby union player
- Rob Thompson (field hockey), English field hockey player

== See also ==
- Rob Thomson, baseball player and coach
- Robert Thompson (disambiguation)
