= Cicely Hey =

British artist (1896–1980)

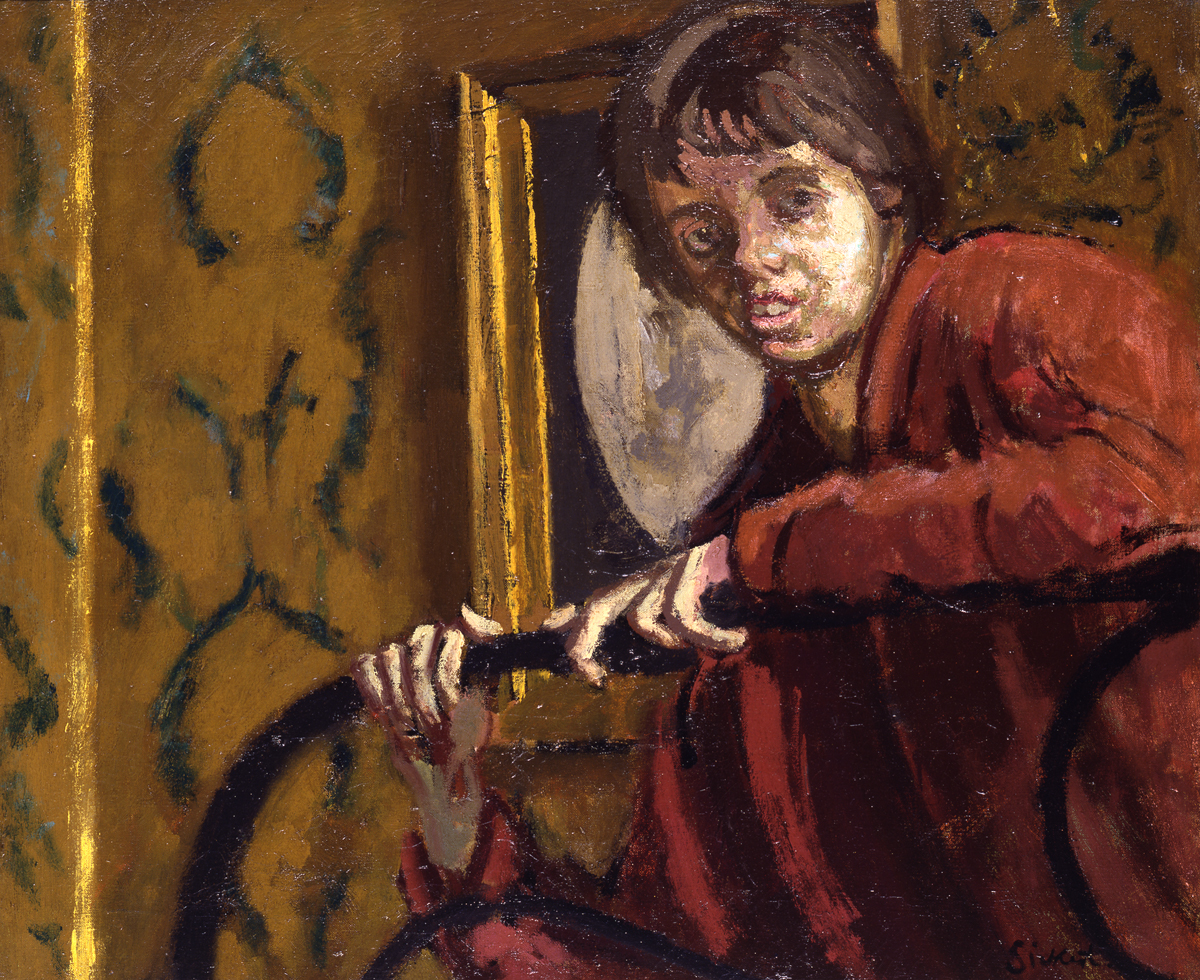
- Portrait of Cicely Hey by Walter Sickert
- Born: 1896; Faringdon, Oxfordshire
- Died: 1980 (aged 83–84)
- Education: Brussels School of Art; Central School of Arts and Crafts; Slade School of Art
- Known for: Painting, sculpture
- Spouse: Robert R. Tatlock

Cicely Hey (1896–1980) was a British artist known as a painter, sculptor and model-maker. Although born in England she spent much of her career in Wales.

== Biography ==
Mary Cicely Hey was born in Faringdon in Oxfordshire, second daughter of affluent surgeon Dr Harold Darwin Hey, M.R.C.S., of Eastfield, Faringdon, himself also a painter, and Mary, daughter of Oxford solicitor George Mallam. Her paternal grandfather was canon Charles Edward Hey, of South Petherton, Ilminster, Somerset.

She first studied art at the Brussels School of Art and then in London at the Central School of Arts and Crafts and the Slade School of Art.

As well as working as a painter and draughtsman, Hey also modelled for the artist Walter Sickert who painted her portrait several times in the early 1920s. The two had first met at a lecture by Roger Fry in January 1923 for which Hey was collecting the ticket money. Hey sat for Sickert on a daily basis throughout January and February 1923 and continued to see him regularly on a social basis afterwards. The large number of drawings and paintings Sickert produced of Hey included a double portrait of the pair of them, Death and the Maiden. The last painting by Sickert to feature Hey had her posed as the sister in The Raising of Lazarus. Sickert gave Hey a large number of paintings and drawings which she donated to the Whitworth Art Gallery in Manchester shortly before she died.

At the time Hey met Sickert she was living in a house in Bloomsbury which she shared with, among others, Robert R. Tatlock, an art critic and long-time editor of the Burlington Magazine, who she later married. Hey began to exhibit at group shows with the London Group from 1928, with the Women's International Art Club, the New English Art Club and the Society of Graphic Artists. Her first solo show was in 1933 at the Lefevre Gallery in London and included drawings of writers and artists including Sickert, Rebecca West and Duncan Grant. In 1938 Hey exhibited a portrait of Sir Adrian Boult at the London Group.

In 1941 Hey moved to north Wales and settled in Llysfaen and began to focus on her model making. She would work in terracotta, wire and paper mache to create miniature period figures often with historically accurate costumes. Examples of her work featured in the Arts Council of Wales 1955 touring exhibition of contemporary Welsh painting and sculpture and she exhibited with the North Wales Group from 1956 to 1968. Between 1957 and 1961 Hey was a regular exhibitor at the art exhibition at the National Eisteddfod of Wales and in 1964 had a solo exhibition, Period Figures, at the Geffrye Museum in London and which also toured. The Llanover Hall arts centre in Cardiff hosted an exhibition of her drawings in 2006 and both the Glynn Vivian Art Gallery in Swansea, the Contemporary Arts Society for Wales and the Museum of English Rural Life in Reading hold pieces by her.
