= Turner (crater) =

Crater on the Moon

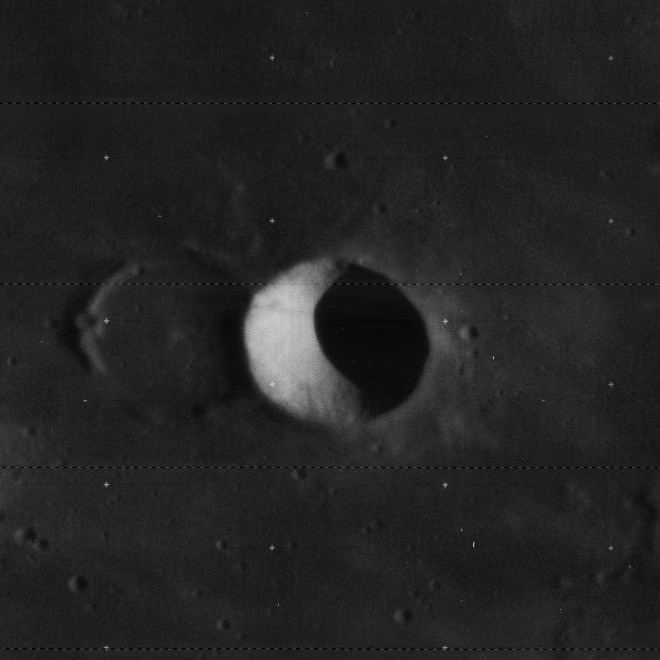
- Lunar Orbiter 4 image
- Coordinates: 1.4°S 13.2°W
- Diameter: 12 km
- Depth: 2.62 km (1.63 mi)
- Colongitude: 13° at sunrise
- Eponym: Herbert H. Turner

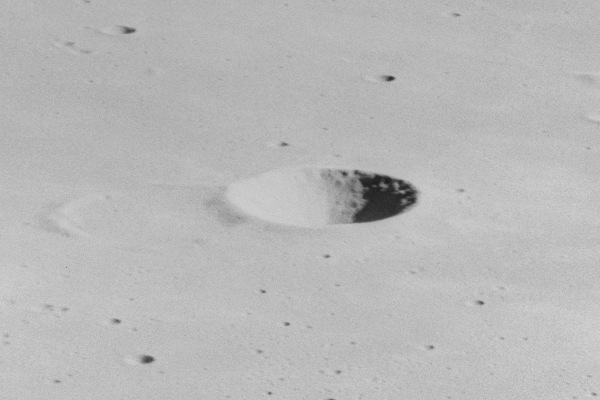
Oblique view of Turner from Apollo 16

Turner is a small lunar impact crater that lies in the Mare Insularum, near the Moon's equator. The crater was named after British astronomer Herbert Hall Turner. It is located to the southeast of the crater Gambart. Turner is a circular, cone-shaped crater with inner walls that slope down to the midpoint. A similar-sized ghost crater is attached to the western rim, its interior floor submerged by lava and the surviving rim broken in the southwest.

== Turner and satellite crater Turner F during full moon ==
The distinct couple of bowl-shaped craters Turner and Turner F, west of Turner, are an easy target during telescopic observations of the full moon. Southwest of satellite crater Turner F, a high-albedo formation which looks like a thin straight southwest running ray is noticeable on the photographic version of chart LAC 76 (page 152) in The Clementine Atlas of the Moon (Ben Bussey / Paul D. Spudis).

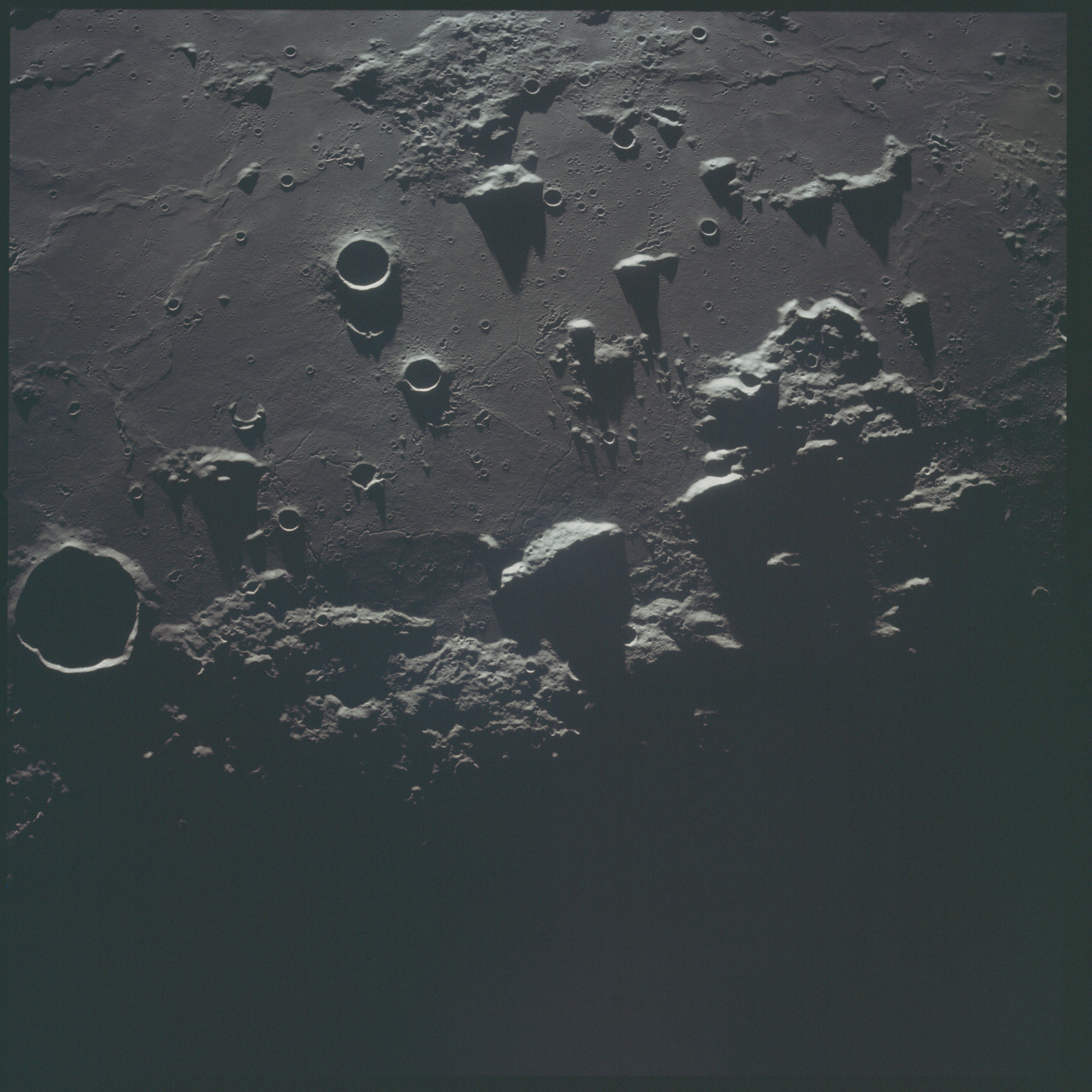
View of the terminator from Apollo 12, with Turner left of center and Gambart at left. Apollo 14 landing site is in shadow at right (unmarked).

== Satellite craters ==
By convention these features are identified on lunar maps by placing the letter on the side of the crater midpoint that is closest to Turner.

Turner	Latitude	Longitude	Diameter
A	1.1° S	14.7° W	6 km
B	0.9° S	10.6° W	5 km
C	2.4° S	12.3° W	5 km
F	1.6° S	14.1° W	7 km
H	2.8° S	13.0° W	4 km
K	3.8° S	13.4° W	4 km
L	3.4° S	12.5° W	5 km
M	4.2° S	11.8° W	4 km
N	2.9° S	12.0° W	4 km
Q	1.0° S	12.4° W	3 km
