= George Haydock Dodgson =

English watercolour artist and woodcut engraver

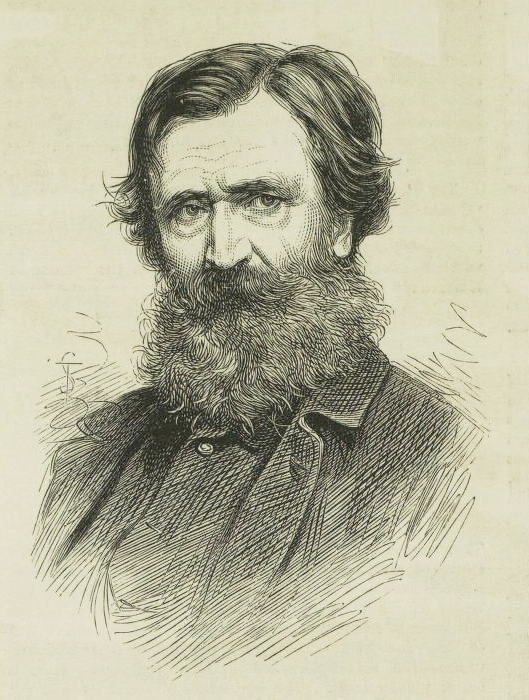

George Haydock Dodgson (16 August 1811 – 4 June 1880) was an English watercolour artist and woodcut engraver. He contributed illustrations to the Illustrated London News.

Dodgson was born in Liverpool, the eight of fifteen children of a linen draper, Pearson and Hannah née Haycock. After school, he trained in drawing under Andrew Hunt. After apprenticing to surveyor Jonathan Bennison, he joined the railway engineer George Stephenson as a surveyor in 1827. He produced the plans for Whitby and Pickering railways. During this period he also made illustrations of the scenery. He saved enough money to resign in 1834 and follow his aspirations to be an artist. He made sketching tours through Britain and began to produce drawings of buildings and worked for architects. He also liked Beech trees and one of his favourite subjects was a tree at Knole that came to be known as Dodgson's Beech. His works of buildings included a Tribute to the Memory of Sir Christopher Wren that was exhibited at the Royal Academy in 1838. He also made woodcuts for the Illustrated London News. He became a member of the original Society Watercolour Society in 1835. He was elected associate to the New Society of Painters in Water Colours in 1842 and became a full member in 1844. A neurological problem caused tremors in his hands and he used a method of dropping paint on wet paper in his technique.

Dodgson married Jane Sims (1819–1908), daughter of George Sims on 30 September 1839 and settled near Regent's Park. They had three children of whom George Pearson (1842–1928) and Jessie (1854–1911) became artists. He moved to St. Johns Wood, London later where he died from congestion of lungs.
