= Robert Thomson (cyclist) =

Robert Thomson is a round-the-world cyclist, yachter and longboarder from New Zealand. Beginning in July 2006, he traveled 12,000 kilometres across Asia and Europe from Fukuoka in Japan to Switzerland by recumbent bicycle, then traveled on to London, England, by skateboard. He completed an unassisted journey of 12,159 km (7,555 miles) across Europe, North America and China by skateboard, starting in Leysin, Switzerland, on 24 June 2007 and finishing in Shanghai, China, on 28 September 2008. His journey is recognised by Guinness World Records as the longest journey by skateboard.
