= Grindon, Staffordshire =

Village in Staffordshire, England

Coordinates: 53°05′11″N 1°52′15″W

Grindon
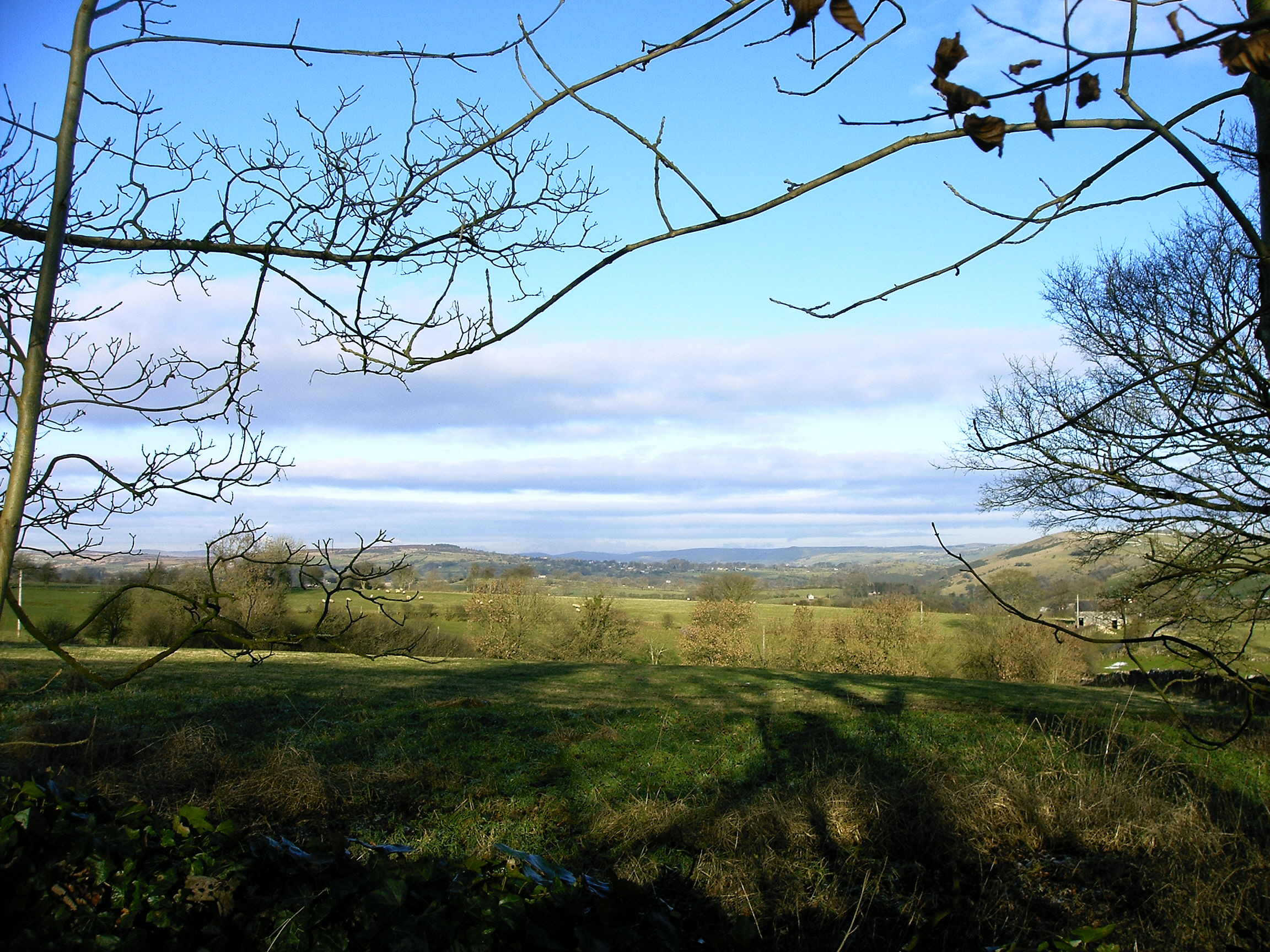
- Looking northwards from Grindon, into the Peak District National Park

- Location within Staffordshire
- Population: 221
- OS grid reference: SK085545
- Shire county: Staffordshire
- Region: West Midlands
- Country: England
- Sovereign state: United Kingdom
- Post town: LEEK
- Postcode district: ST13
- Police: Staffordshire
- Fire: Staffordshire
- Ambulance: West Midlands
- UK Parliament: Staffordshire Moorlands

Grindon is a small village in the Staffordshire Moorlands district of Staffordshire, England. Close to the Peak District.

== Geography ==
Grindon is situated near the southern end of the Peak District National Park. It is at the top of the western edge of the limestone bank of the Manifold Valley, south of Butterton and opposite Wetton on the eastern side of the valley. A comparison of two views north from the village gives some indication of the bleakness of this area in winter. The nearer village, left of centre, is Butterton, while the far skyline is of Derbyshire.

The river crossing between Grindon and Wetton is known as The Weags. The slope down to the Manifold is very steep on both sides, with several hairpin-bends on the road. A little downstream from The Weags is the confluence with the River Hamps, which flows from Waterhouses, and is the main tributary of the Manifold. Opposite this is Beeston Torr, a rock face popular with climbers.

This section of the Manifold, and also the Hamps, runs dry for much of the year. The Manifold goes underground near Wetton Mill, and rises at Ilam.

== The Village ==
Much of the village is built of limestone. There is a Parish Church and until recently a public house (The Cavalier) now a private house, but few other facilities.

The main industry is farming, now supplemented by tourism. However, the village is, by modern standards, remote and "off the beaten track". Also, much of the land in the locality is either moorland (to the west) or the steep slope down to the River Manifold. Farming is relatively unproductive, mainly suited to sheep and cattle.

== All Saints Church ==
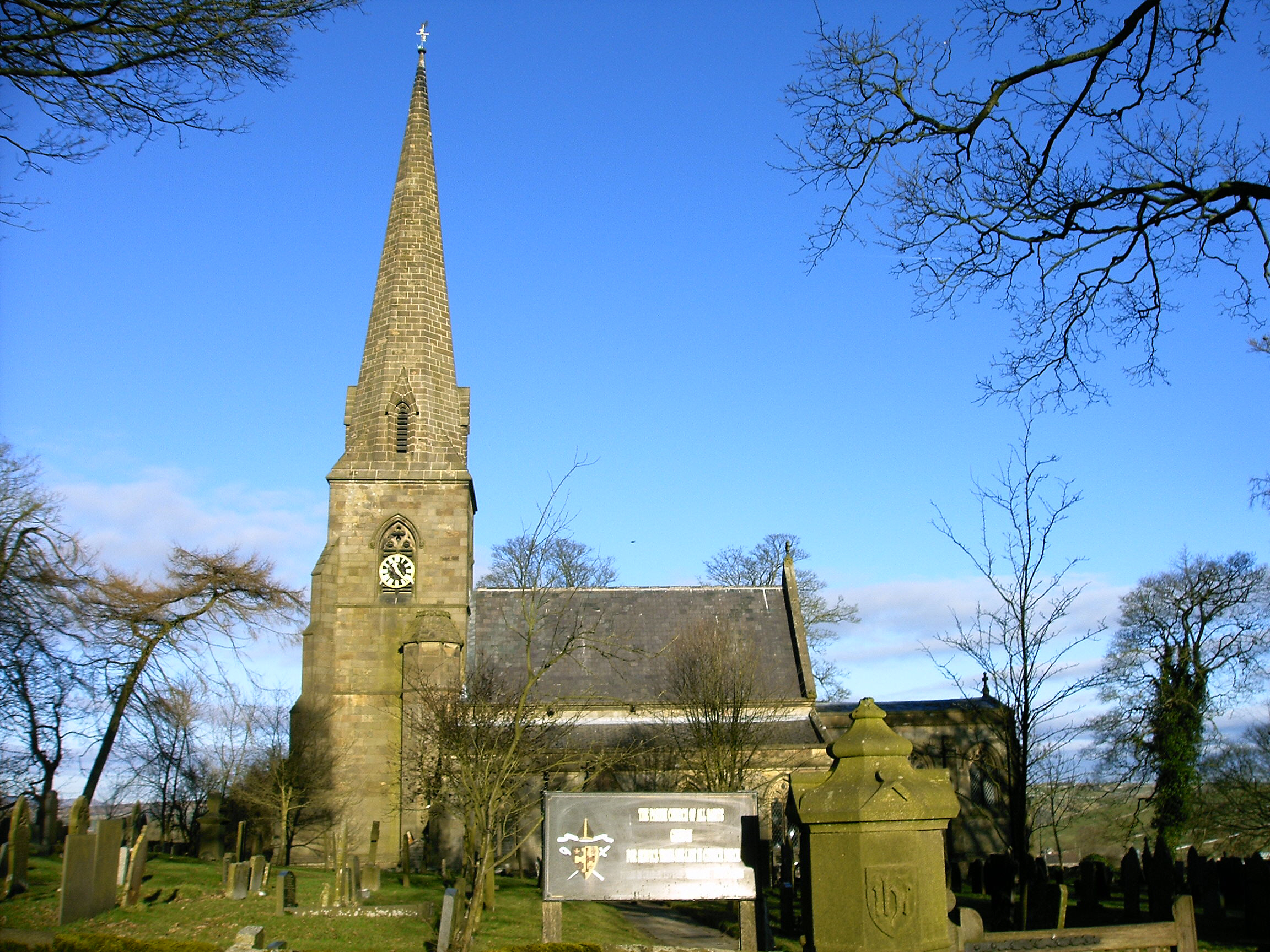
All Saints Parish Church

The Parish Church is a typical village church with a tower topped with an elegant spire which makes a conspicuous landmark from across the Manifold Valley. From this it received the nickname "the Cathedral of the Moorlands". The present building was built in 1848. The first church in Grindon was built in the 11th century as a chapel of ease for the Parish of St Bartram, Ilam. One of the rectors of Grindon parish was Anthony Draycot who served from 1540 to his imprisonment in 1560. Draycott was the judge at the heresy trial of Joan Waste.

The Church is decorated with an interesting selection of stone carvings both inside and outside. While most of these are human heads, there are other animals, such as those climbing down the window frame on the south-west corner of the tower.

The War Memorial tablet inside the Church shows those of the village who fought in World War I. 23 men served, of whom 5 were killed and 18 returned to the village.

The Parish, in the Diocese of Lichfield, is in the Alstonefield Deanery, and now part of a Parish group. The Vicar lives at Waterhouses (December 2008). The associated Parishes are Calton St. Mary; Grindon All Saints; Okeover All Saints; Waterfall St. James and St. Bartholomew; Blore Ray St. Bartholomew; and Cauldon St. Mary and St. Laurence.

== History and tourism ==
Grindon was served by a railway station which was close to the Beeston Tor and was opened by the Leek and Manifold Valley Light Railway on 27 June 1904, whilst being entirely operated by the North Staffordshire Railway. The village was a little distance from the station, and the fact that the line followed the valley bottom whereas the settlements served by the railway were mostly on the hill-tops above was a contributory factor in its demise. The line closed in 1934, but in 1937 the route was reopened as the Manifold Way, a fully tarmacked 8-mile walk- and cycle-path which runs from Hulme End in the north to Waterhouses in the south.

The severe winter of February to April 1947 brought particular hardship for moorlands villages like Grindon. Relief was brought by air, but one RAF Halifax aircraft crashed into the moors near Grindon during a severe blizzard. A memorial to the crew and passengers is in the Church.

== Additional photos ==
These pictures show some examples of the carvings around the porch of All Saints Church building.

There is a wide variety of carved heads around the building, both inside and outside.

Most of the windows, at least along the Nave, have the scroll carvings but a window with carved heads may be seen above the clock.

The sundial is above the porch, which is the south door entrance.

Two interesting carved animals are climbing down one corner of the tower. The sense of movement shows the skill of the artisans.

These carved heads are on each side of the porch.

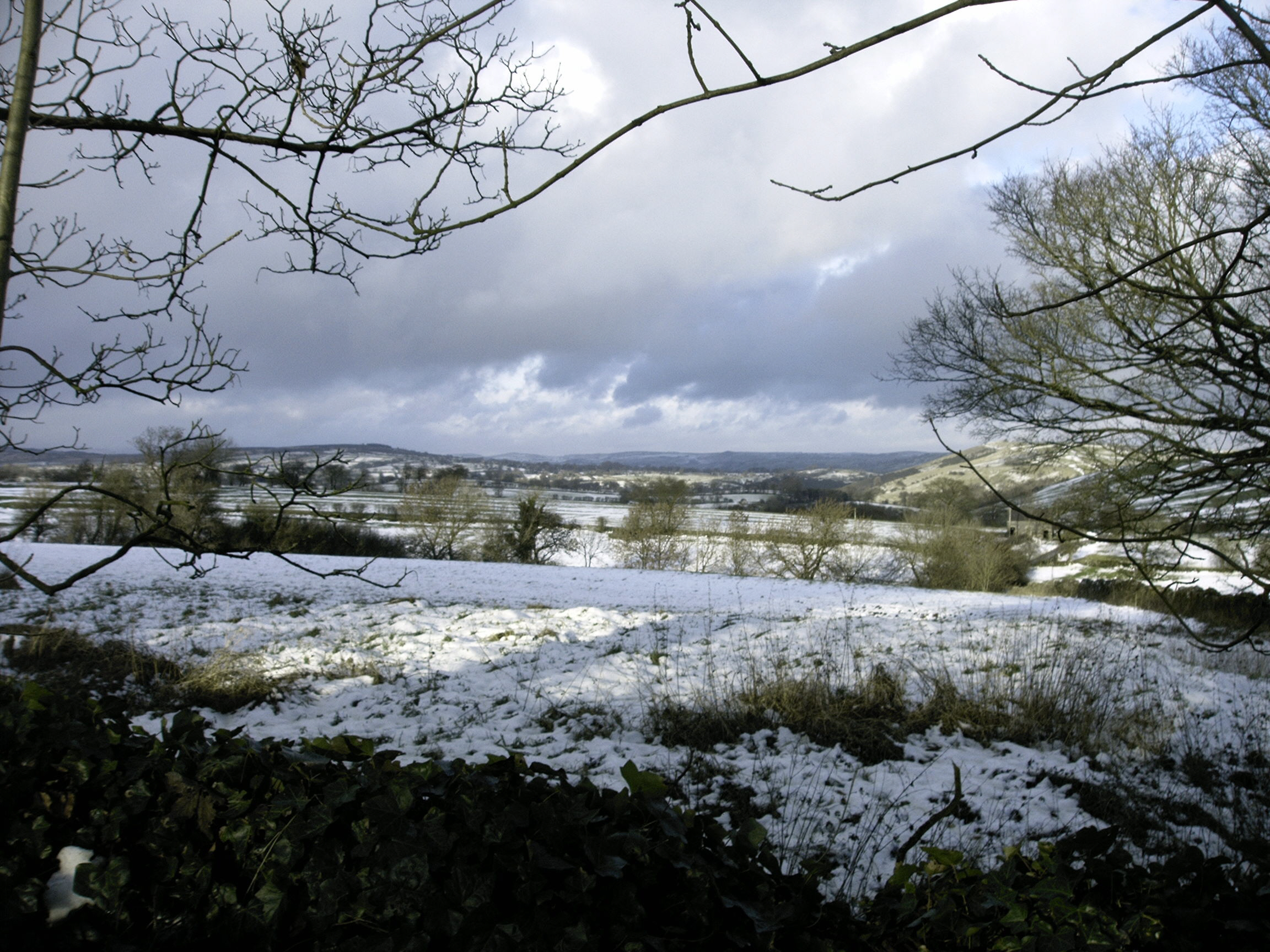
Looking northwards after snowfall

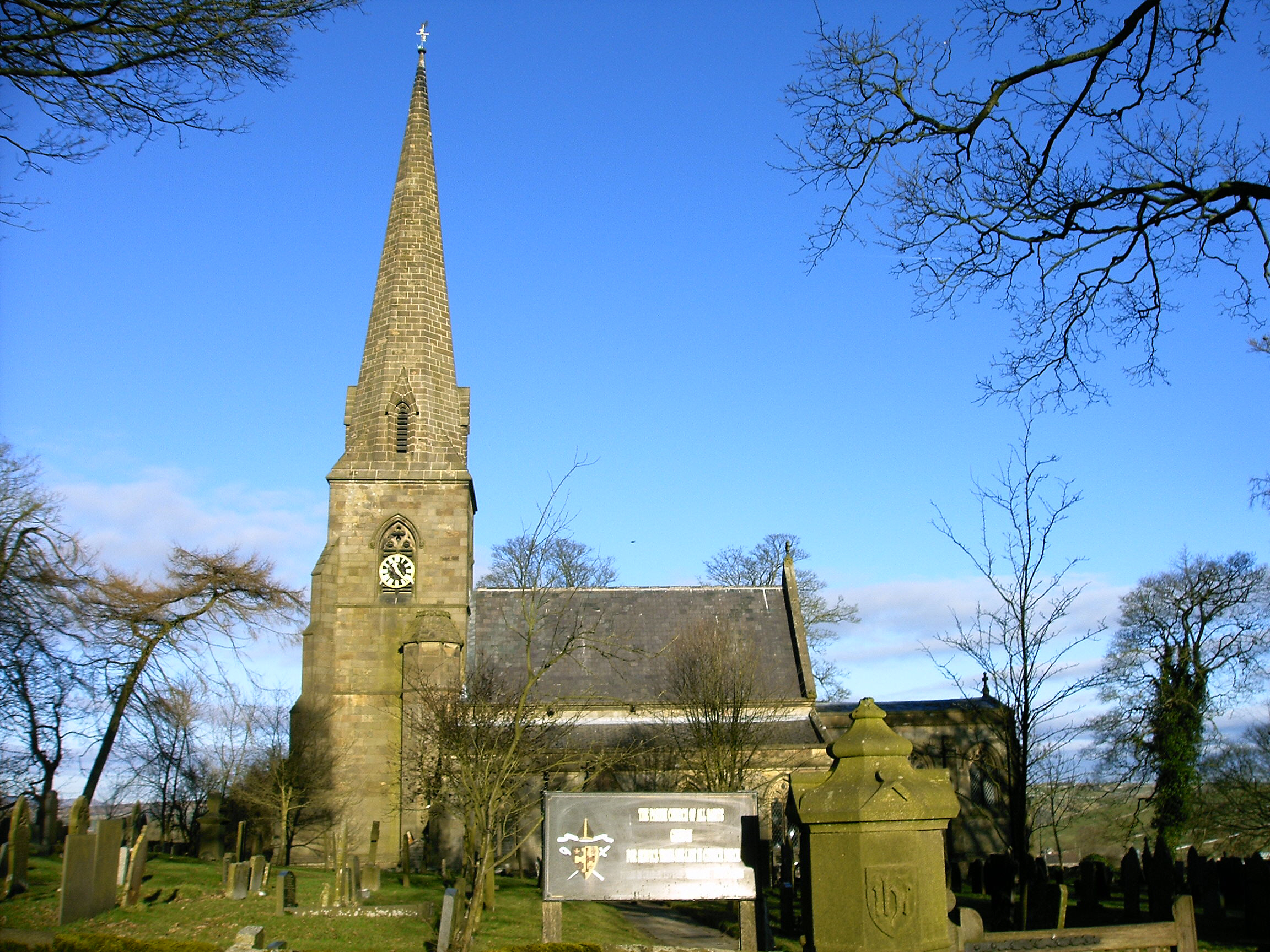
All Saints Parish Church

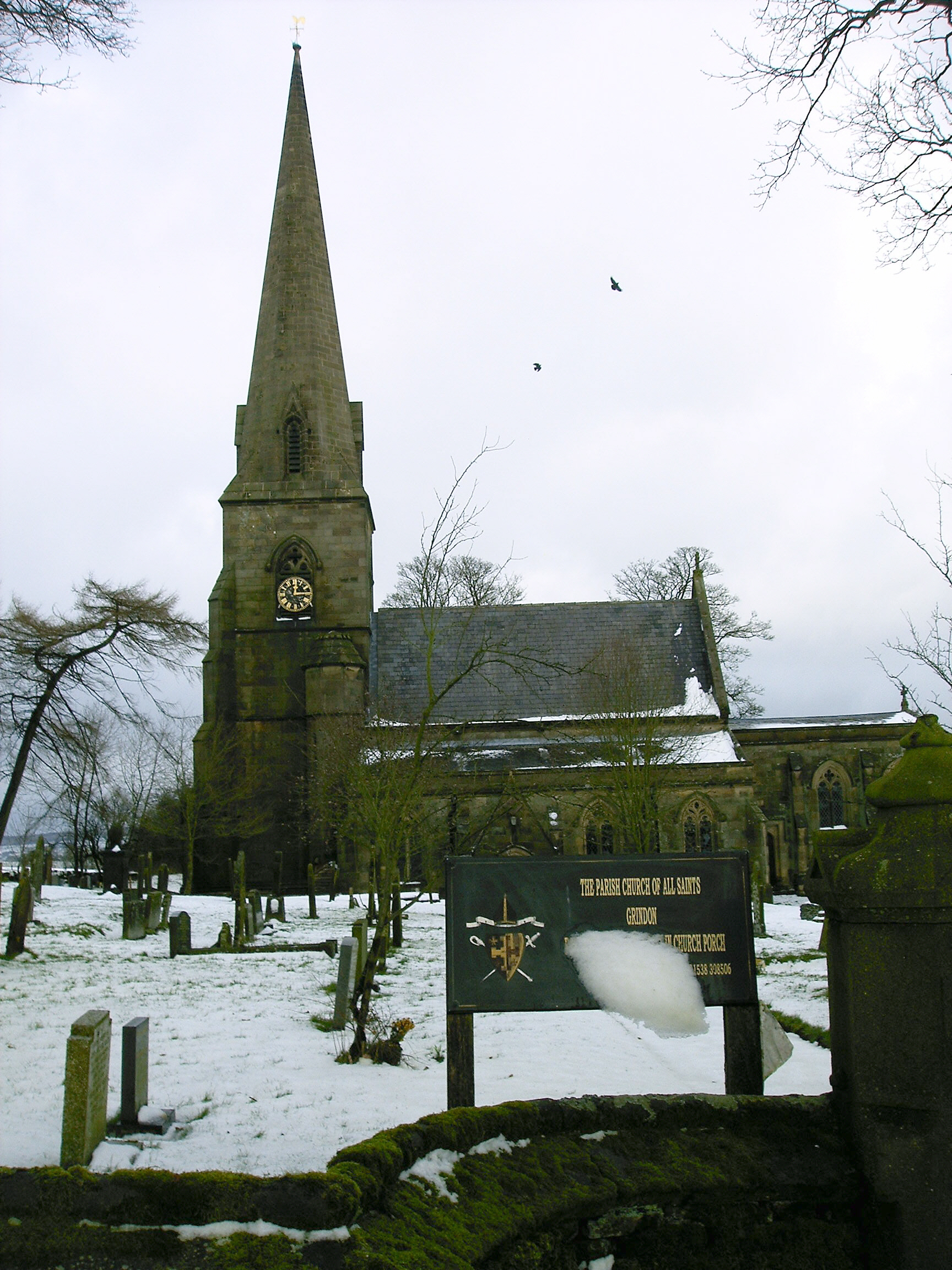
The Church after snow

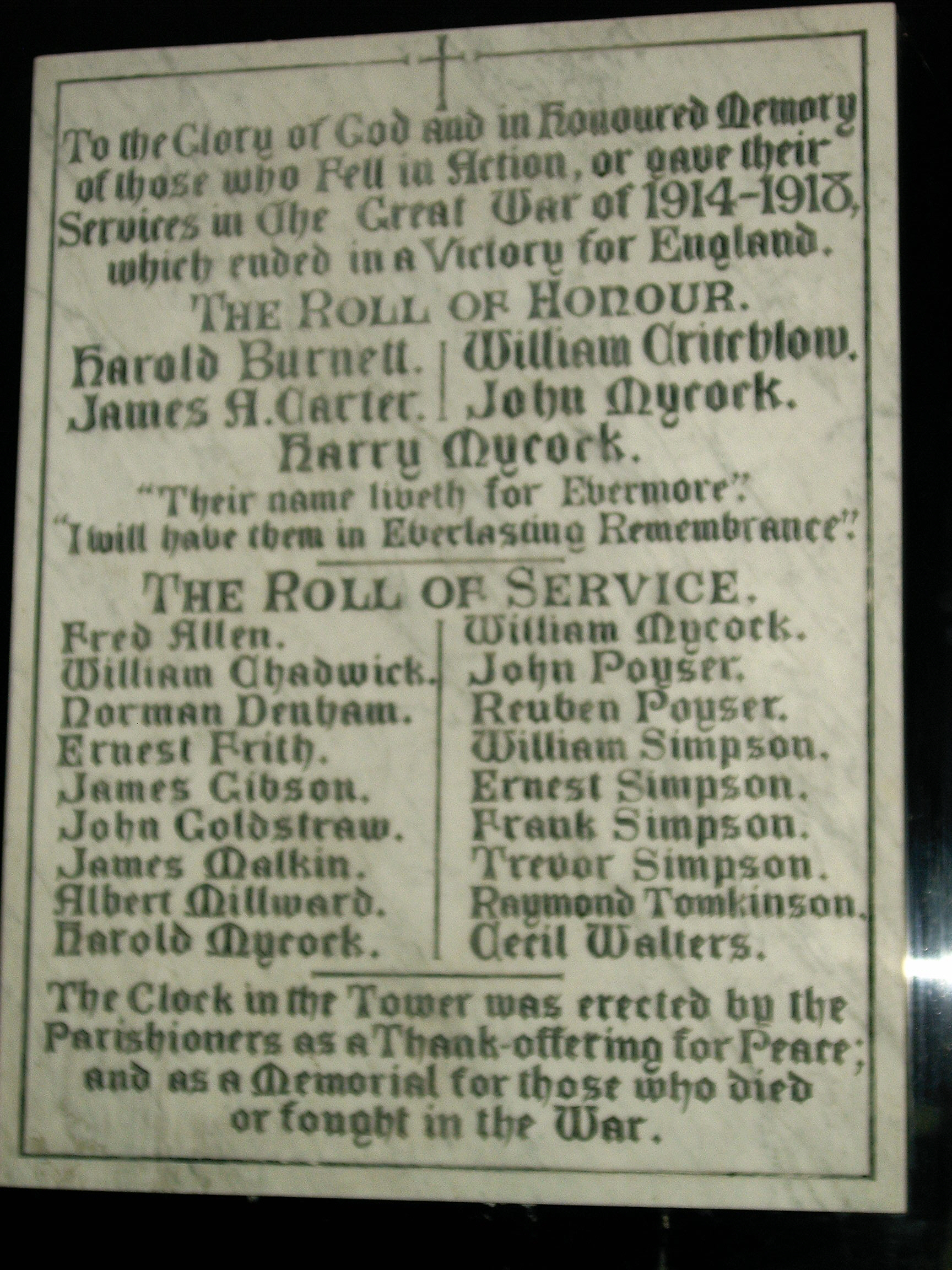
The War Memorial

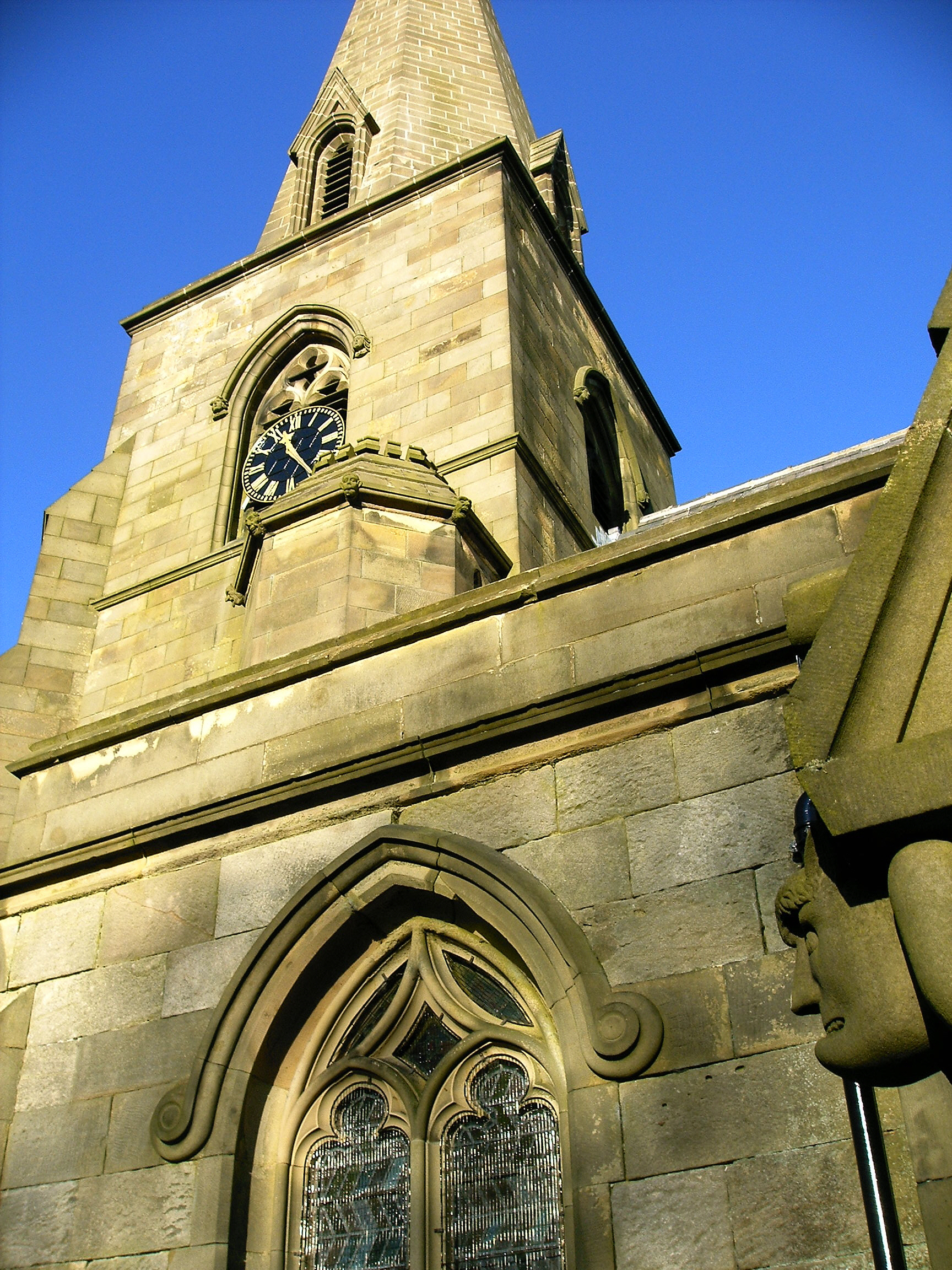
Detail of Tower

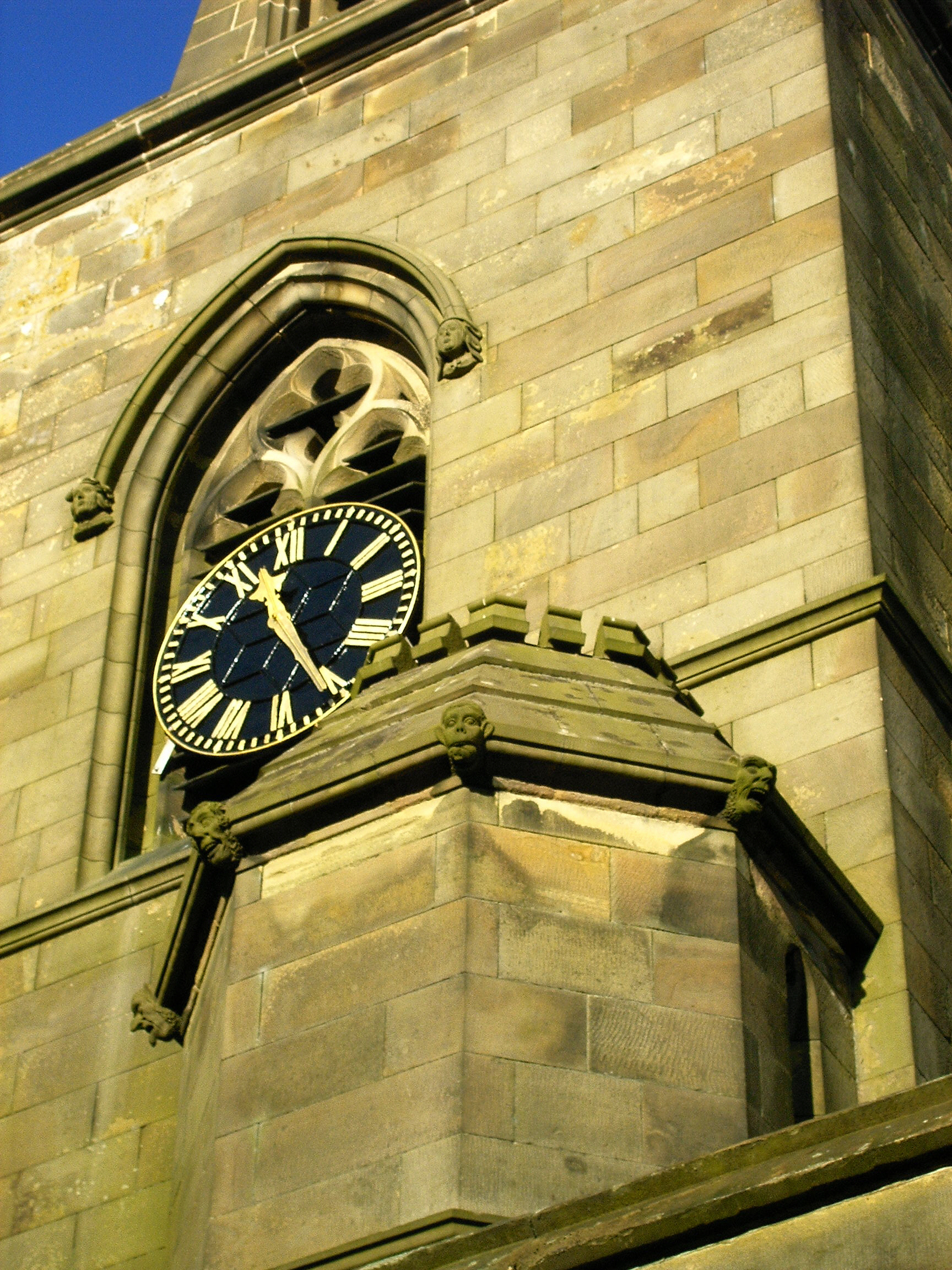
Detail of carving

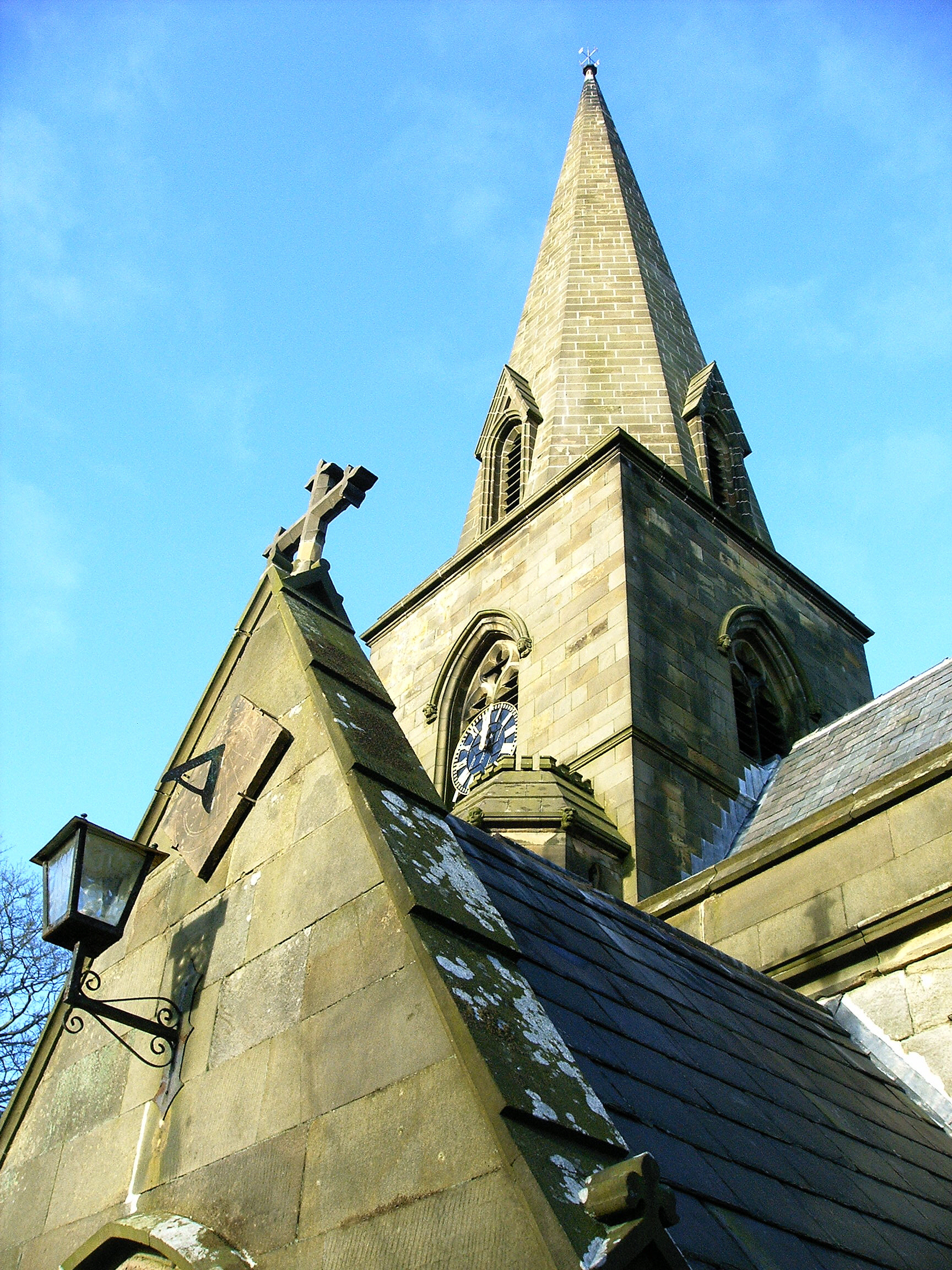
Sundial

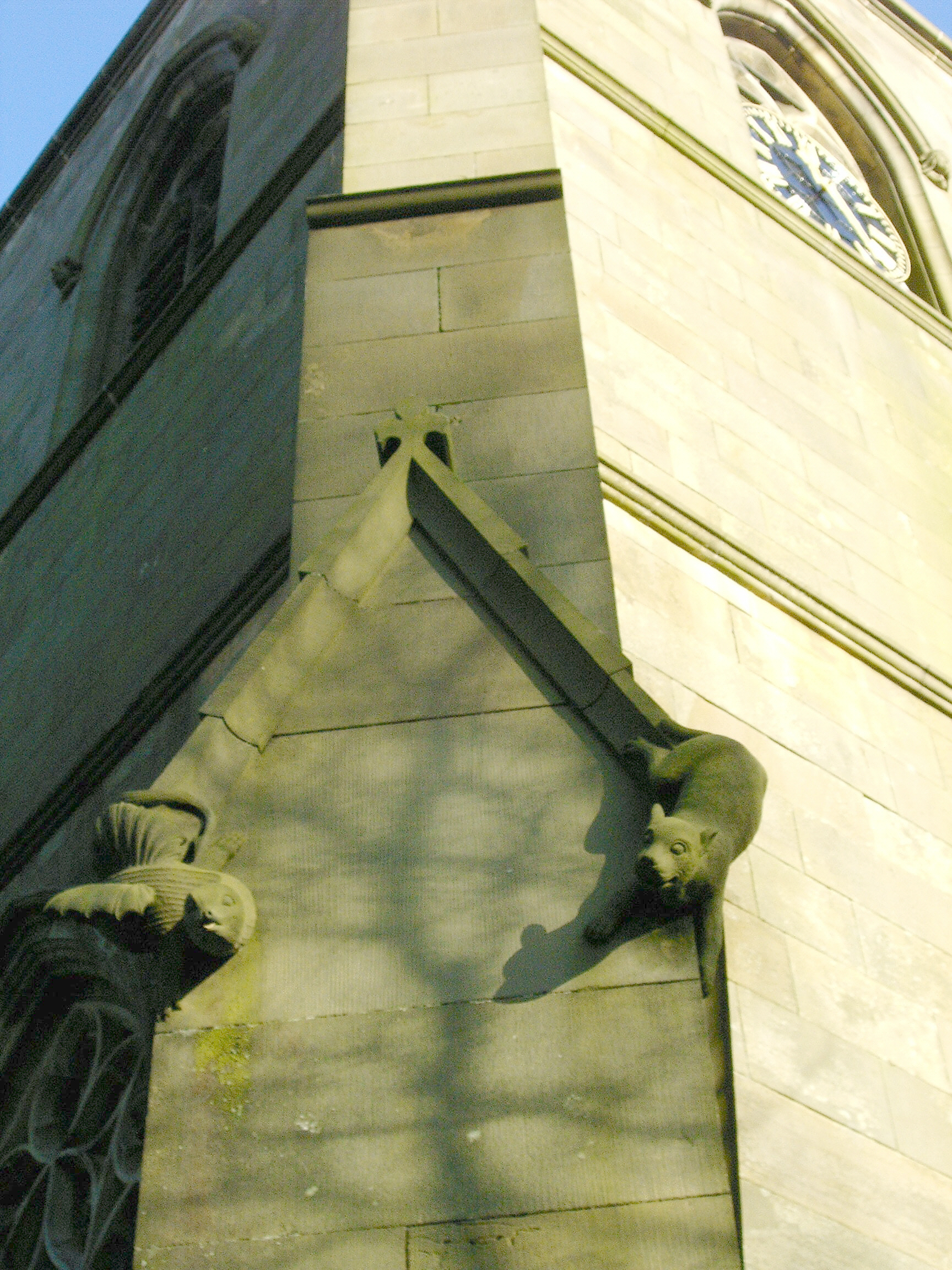
Detail of carving

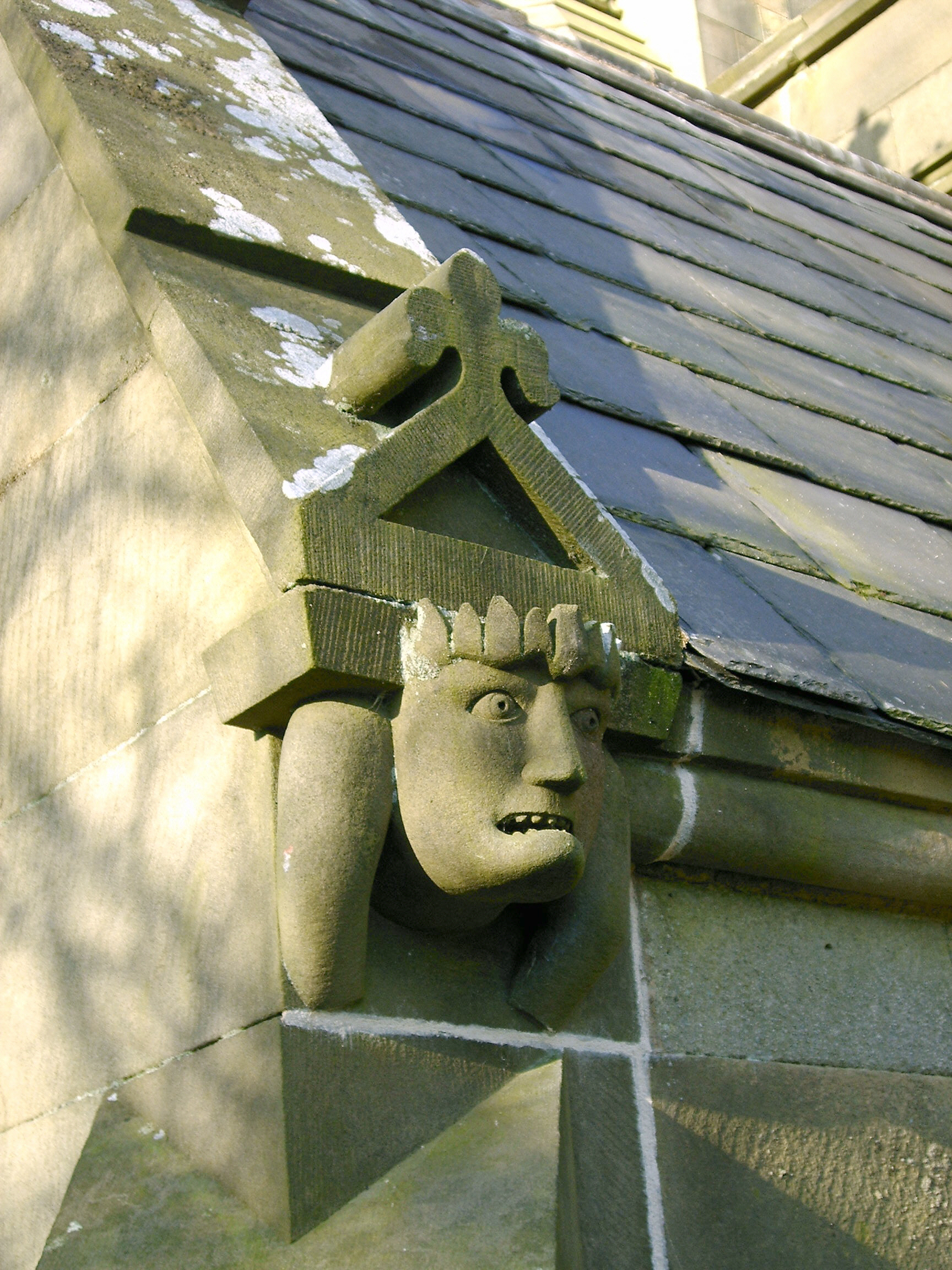
Detail of carving

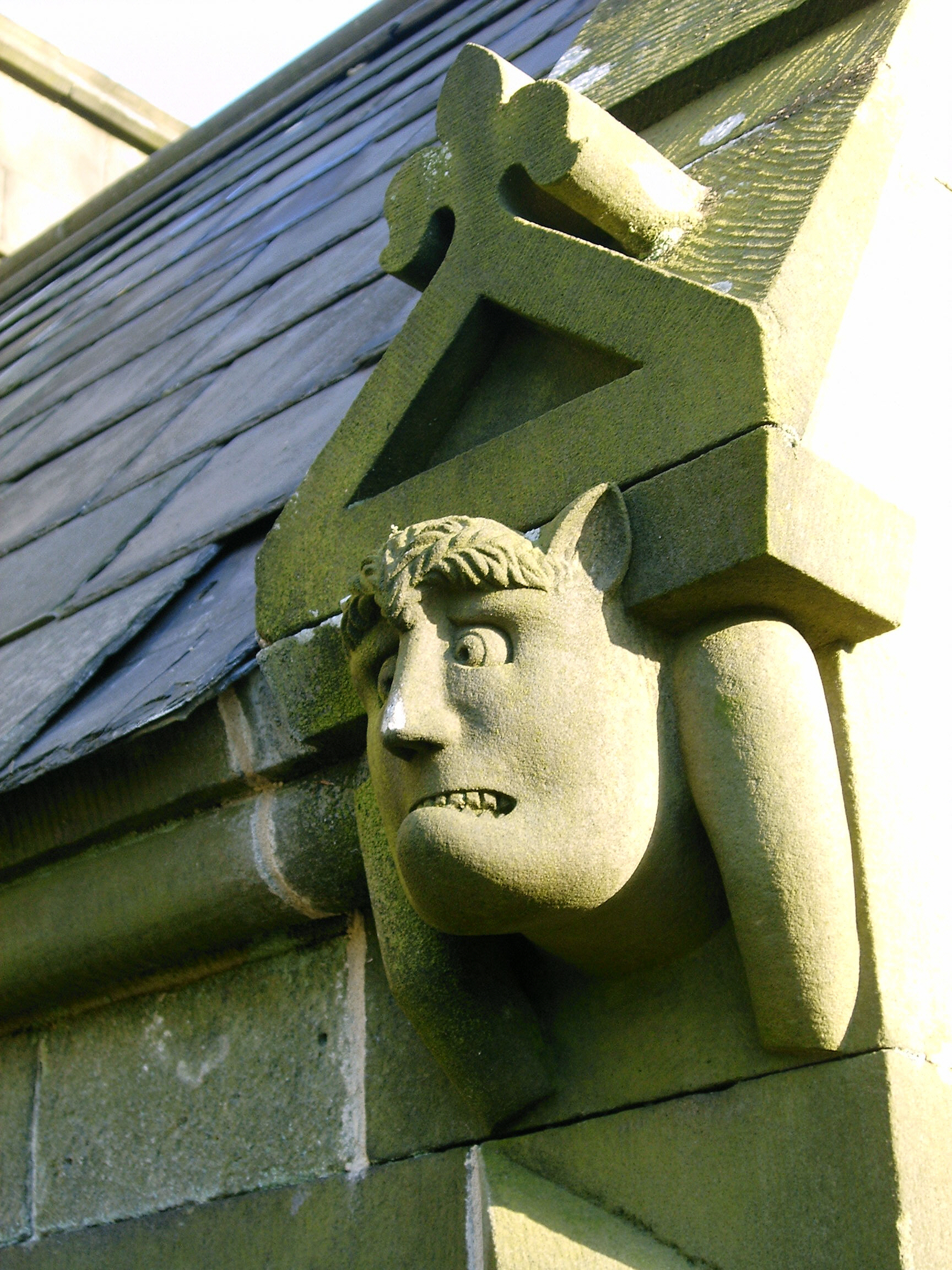
Detail of carving

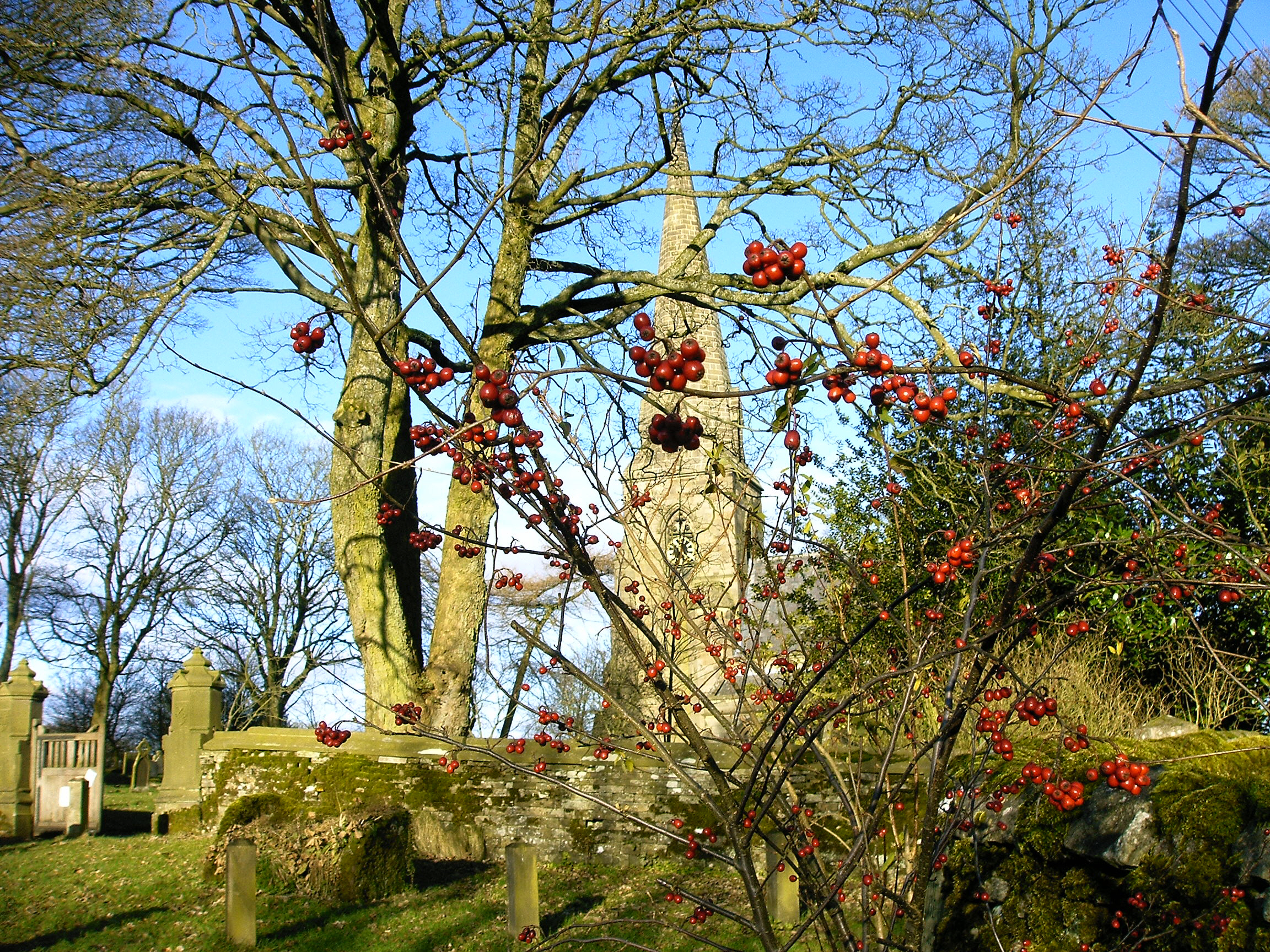
Winter berries in Grindon village

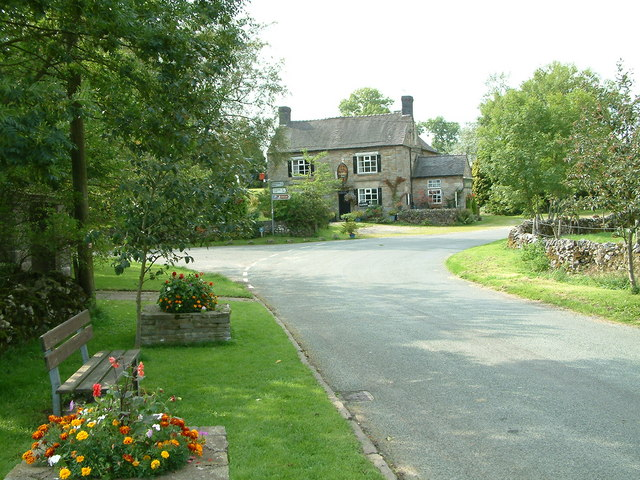
The Cavalier Inn

== See also ==
- Listed buildings in Grindon, Staffordshire
