= Campbell Dodgson =

British art historian and museum curator

Campbell Dodgson CBE DLitt Hon RE
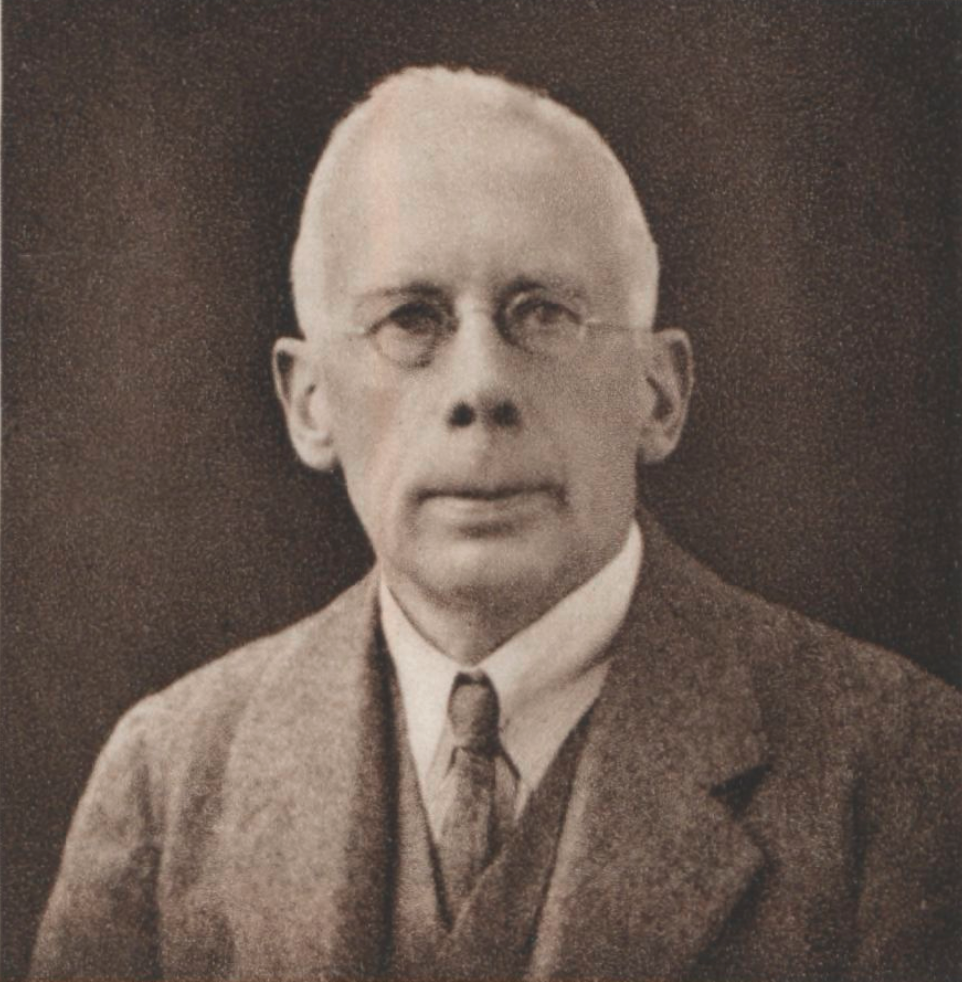
- Born: 13 August 1867
- Died: 11 July 1948 (aged 80)
- Occupation(s): Art historian, museum curator
- Spouse: Catharine Dodgson (m. 1913)
- Parents: William Oliver Dodgson (father); Lucy Elizabeth Smith (mother)
- Relatives: Lewis Carroll (cousin), Stephen Dodgson (great-nephew)

Campbell Dodgson (13 August 1867 – 11 July 1948) was a British art historian and museum curator. He was the Keeper of Prints and Drawings at the British Museum in 1912–32.

== Biography ==
=== Student ===
Campbell Dodgson was the eighth and last child of William Oliver Dodgson, a London stockbroker, and Lucy Elizabeth Smith, daughter of Henley Smith who owned the Priory on the Isle of Wight which had been passed into the Grose-Smith family after the death of Sir Nash Grose. He was a distant cousin of Charles Lutwidge Dodgson, better known as author Lewis Carroll. His close relatives included his brother Edward Spencer Dodgson, his nephew the artist John Arthur Dodgson, and his great-nephew the British composer and broadcaster Stephen Cuthbert Dodgson.

Dodgson was a scholar at Winchester, 1880–86, and New College, Oxford University, 1886–91, where he was listed in the directory as having studied previously at Winchester College, and the seventh son of William Oliver Dodgson, gentleman. He obtained a First in Greats (ancient history and philosophy) in 1890, and a Second in Theology in 1891.

In 1934 Dodgson was given the honorary degree of DLitt at Oxford Convocation. The Times of London reports: "Mr. Dodgson was described as ex animo Wiccamicus, Collegii Novi quondam scholaris et Custodis illustrissimi, nuper perempti, gener. His long and distinguished record as Keeper of Drawings and Prints at the, British Museum testifies to his expert knowledge, as does also his editorship of the Print' Collectors' Quarterly. The Ashmolean has to thank him not only for a catalogue of woodcuts but for training Dr. Parker, the present Keeper of the Department of Fine Arts. He has recently been awarded the Hindenburg Prize for Kunst und Wissenschafft."

=== Curator ===
Dodgson initially worked as a tutor, attempting to help his fellow Oxonian Lord Alfred Douglas. An active poet and not-so-active student, Lord Alfred had been sent down from Magdalen College in Hilary term, and the tutorship was a last-ditch attempt to assist the poet to restart his studies and take a degree. After this push failed, Dodgson was called later in 1893 to the British Museum, where he established his career as a librarian and became an art historian specializing in works on paper (1893–1932). He learnt German, 'writing German without difficulty' (DNB, 1941-50 : 215) and made many contributions to German periodicals (ibid.).

On the retirement of Sir Sidney Colvin in 1912 Dodgson was appointed Keeper of Prints and Drawings. Dodgson specialized in early modern Flemish and German prints, and published extensively on the works of Albrecht Dürer, but he also applied his expertise to works of many other schools and periods. During the First World War (1914–18) he worked in Intelligence for the War Office; his 1918 CBE was a recognition of this work (DNB, 1941-50 : 216).

In 1913 Dodgson married Frances Catharine Spooner, an artist who trained at the Slade School and became known as Catharine Dodgson. Catharine Dodgson was the eldest daughter of William Archibald Spooner (Warden of New College and the eponymous author of 'Spoonerisms'), in 1913 (DNB, 1941-50 : 216).

Dodgson was the editor, in the 1920s, of The Print Collector’s Quarterly. He was also a contributor to The Burlington Magazine and to the Dictionary of National Biography.

Dodgson gave generously to the British Museum during his Keepership, but at the same time amassed a very large collection of over 10,000 prints which he bequeathed to the Museum. This included the first works by Pablo Picasso and Salvador Dalí to enter that collection. The same bequest included also the box file Dodgson used to document his acquisitions, which have recently been added to the British Museum’s online database.

He wrote about and championed women artists, including his wife Catherine Dodgson, Gwen Raverat, and Margaret Pilkington.
