= Gambart (crater) =

Crater on the Moon

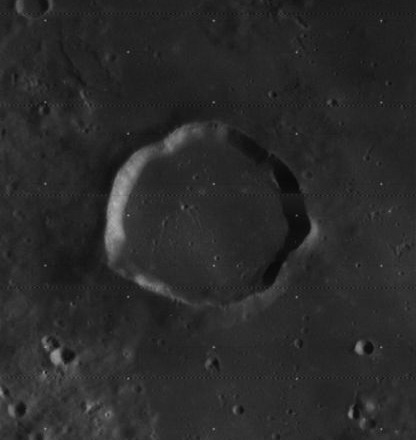
- Lunar Orbiter 4 image
- Coordinates: 1.0°N 15.2°W
- Diameter: 24.68 km (15.34 mi)
- Depth: 1.1 km (0.68 mi)
- Colongitude: 15° at sunrise
- Eponym: J.-F. A. Gambart

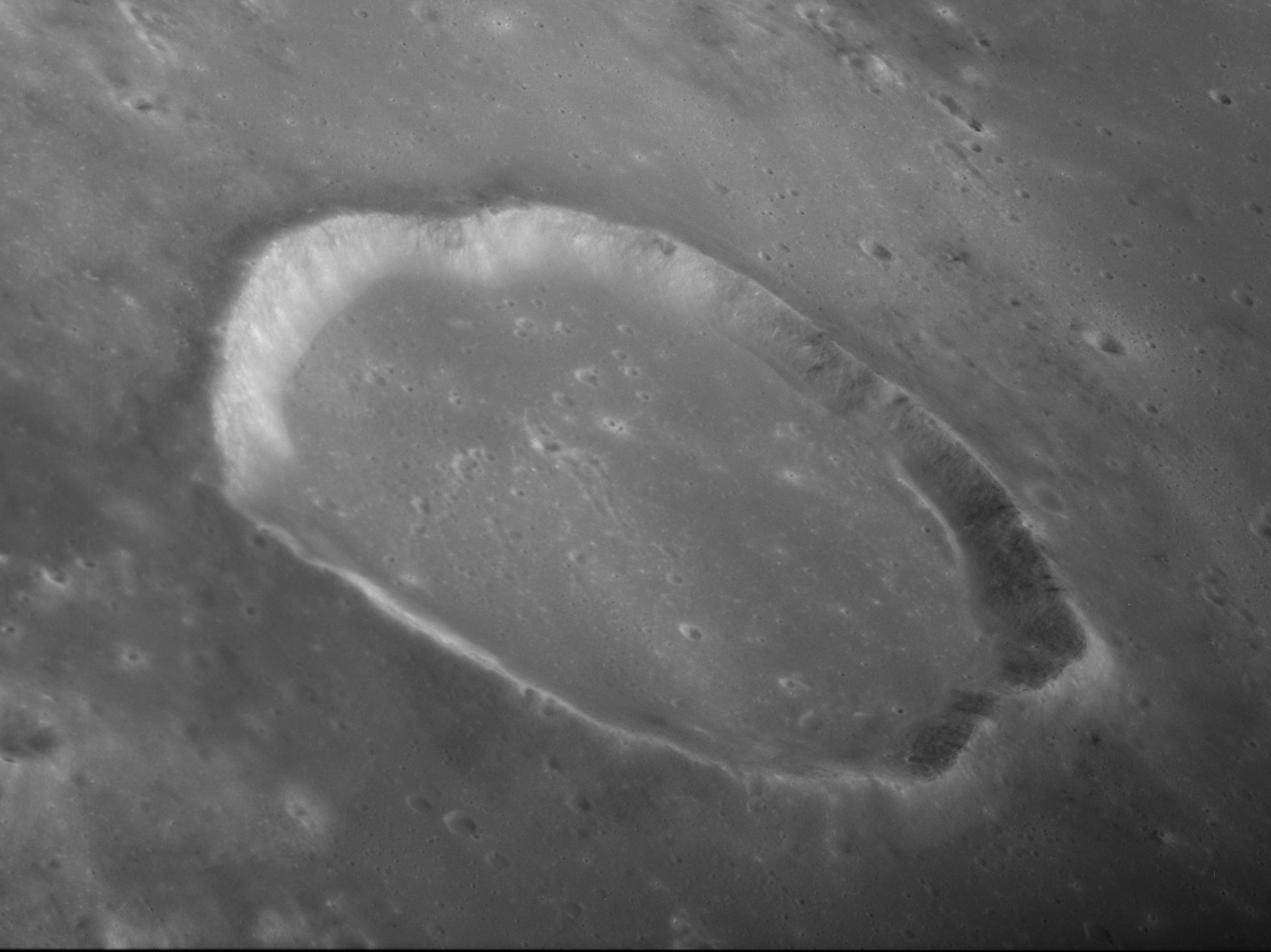
Oblique view of Gambart from Apollo 12

Gambart is a small lunar impact crater on the Mare Insularum, near the central region of the Moon. It can be located to the south-southeast of the prominent ray crater Copernicus. To the southeast of Gambart is the small crater Turner, while the prominent crater Reinhold is to the west northwest.

In the past, the floor of Gambart has been flooded with lava basalt, leaving a relatively flat surface surrounded by a sharp but somewhat polygon-shaped outer rim. To the southwest of Gambart is an area of hilly terrain deposited from ejecta during the Mare Imbrium impact, known as the Fra Mauro Formation.

The smaller Gambart C crater is located to the northeast of Gambart itself. Roughly between Gambart and Gambart C is a lunar dome, a type of shield volcano. Multiple other domes have been reported in the vicinity. The Surveyor 2 probe crashed to the northeast of Gambart C.

This formation is named after French astronomer Jean-Félix Adolphe Gambart (1800-1836). His name was incorporated with the lunar nomenclature of German astronomer Johann H. Mädler during the 19th century. Its designation was officially adopted by the International Astronomical Union in 1935.

== Satellite craters ==
By convention these features are identified on lunar maps by placing the letter on the side of the crater midpoint that is closest to Gambart.

Gambart	Latitude	Longitude	Diameter
A	1.0° N	18.7° W	12 km
B	2.2° N	11.5° W	11 km
C	3.3° N	11.8° W	12 km
D	3.4° N	17.7° W	6 km
E	1.0° N	17.2° W	4 km
F	0.1° N	16.9° W	5 km
G	1.9° N	12.0° W	6 km
H	3.2° N	10.6° W	4 km
J	0.7° S	18.2° W	7 km
K	3.9° N	14.2° W	4 km
L	3.3° N	15.3° W	4 km
M	5.4° N	11.7° W	4 km
N	0.5° S	14.9° W	5 km
R	0.6° S	20.8° W	4 km
S	0.1° S	13.2° W	3 km

Gambart J is a concentric (double-walled) crater.

During full moon, the bright white looking bowl-shaped crater Gambart A is, in the region south of Copernicus, a telescopic eye-catcher. The brightness of Gambart A is also noticeable on the photographic version of chart LAC 58 (page 116) in The Clementine Atlas of the Moon (Ben Bussey / Paul D. Spudis).

=== Gallery ===
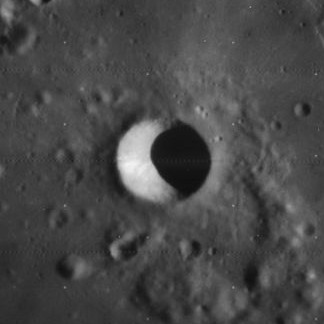
Lunar Orbiter 4 image of Gambart A

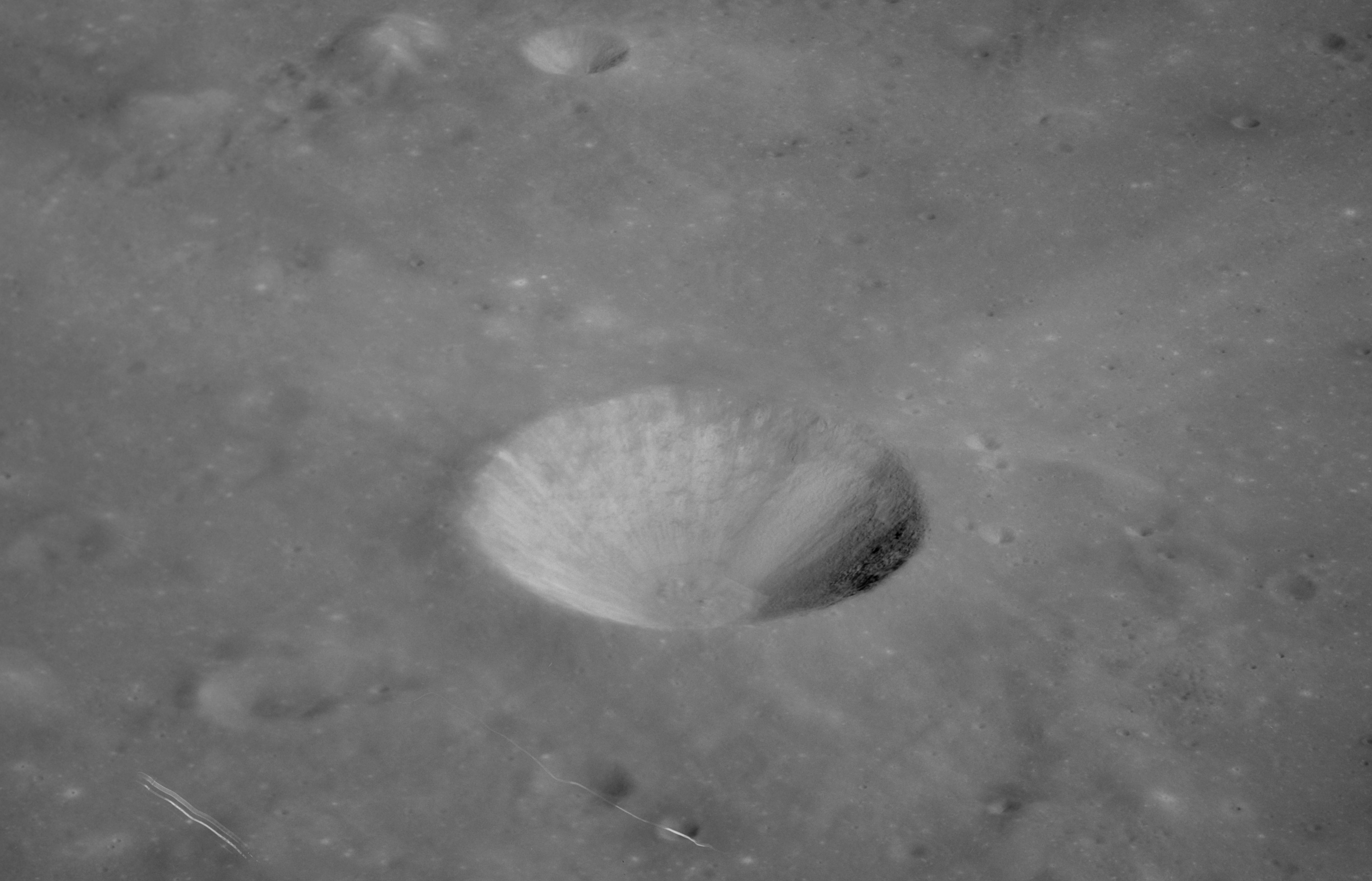
Oblique Apollo 12 image of Gambart A

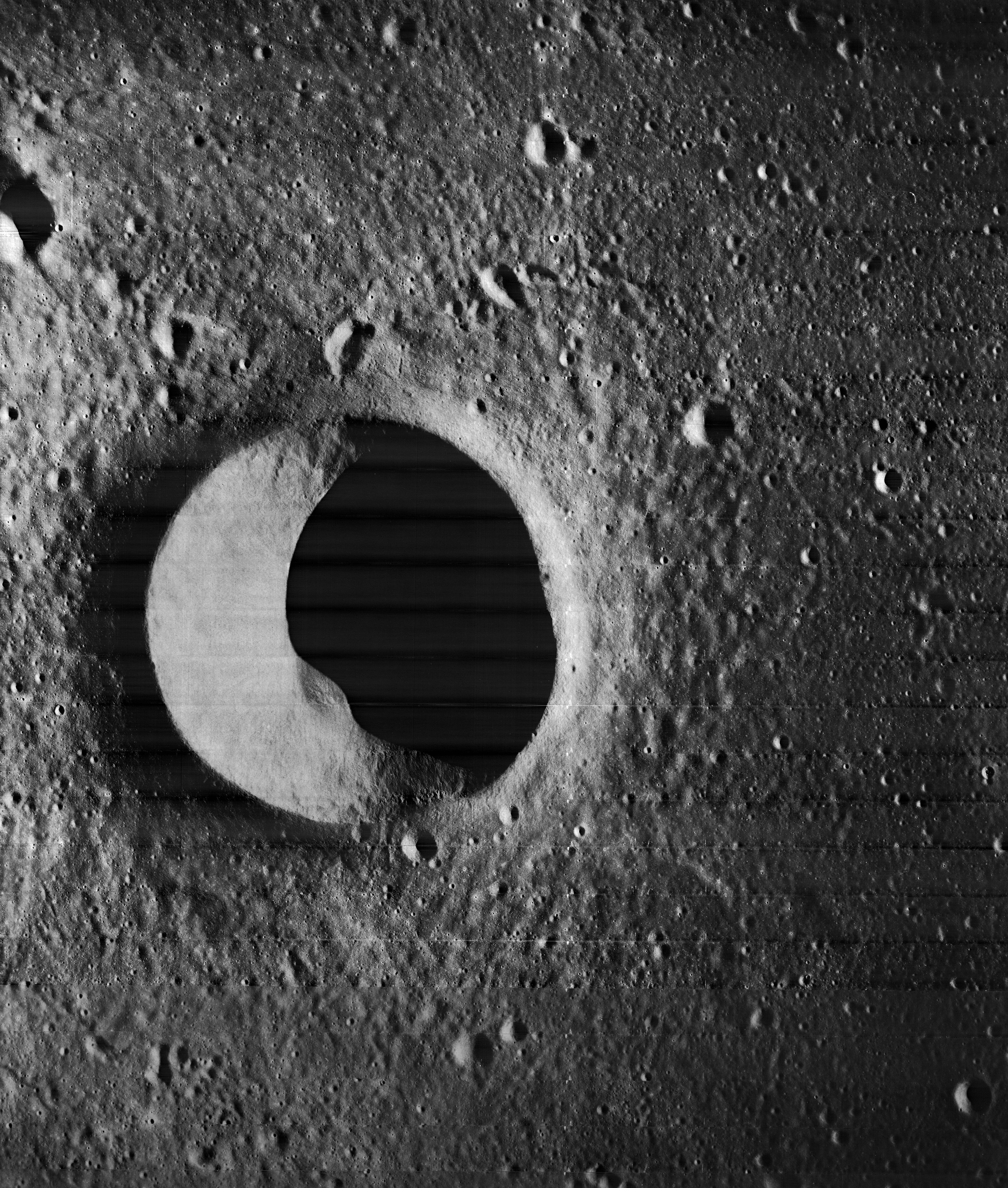
Lunar Orbiter 2 image of Gambart C

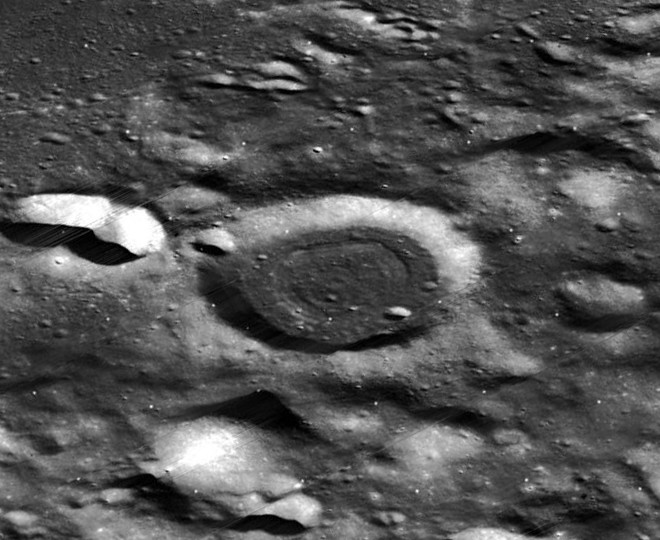
Lunar Orbiter 3 image of Gambart J

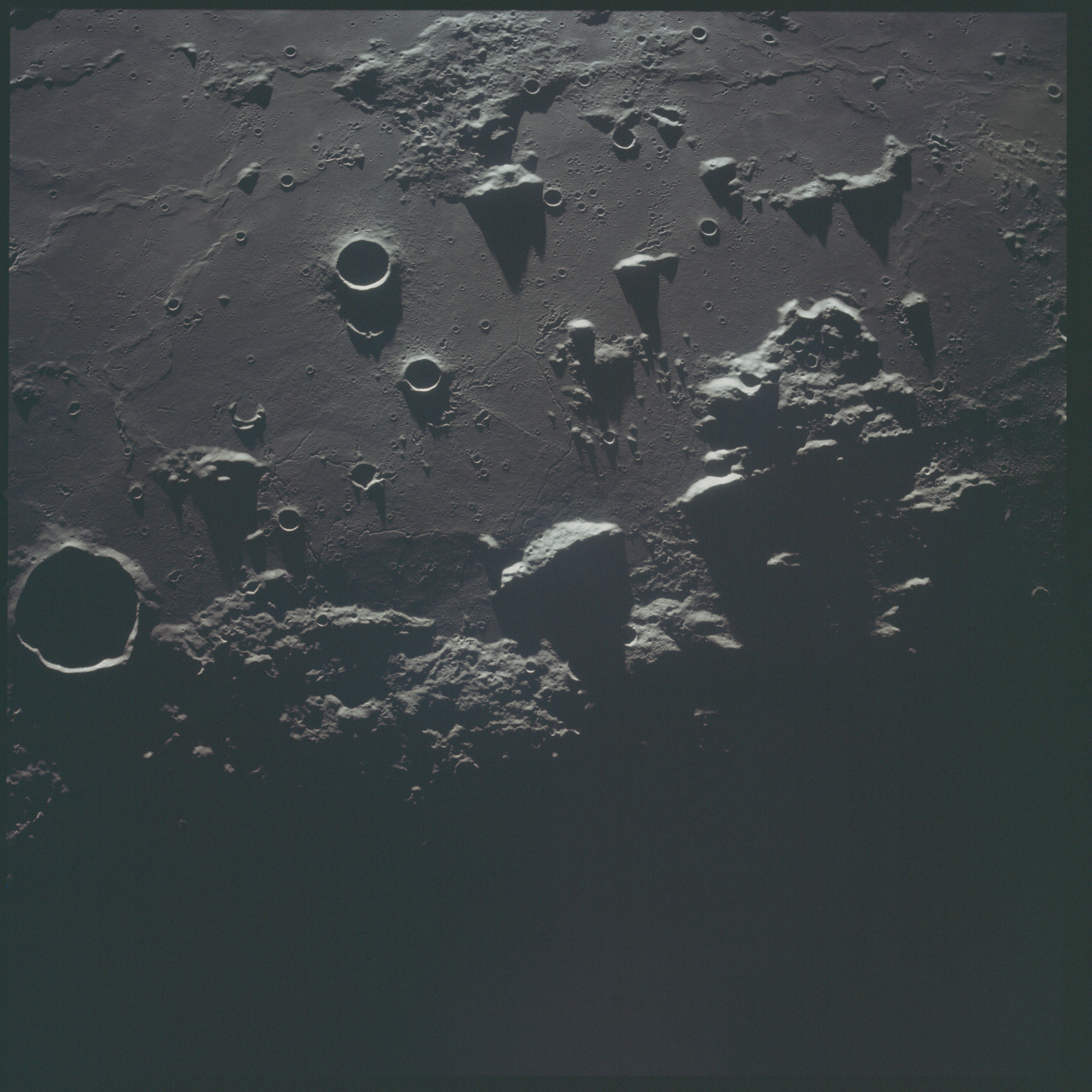
Lunar terminator from Apollo 12, with Gambart at left and Turner left of center. Apollo 14 landing site is in shadow at right (unmarked).
