= Robert Schuyler Thompson =

Canadian politician (1844–1930)

Robert Schuyler Thompson (September 16, 1844 – May 28, 1930) was a farmer, businessman and political figure in Manitoba. He represented Cypress from 1886 to 1888 in the Legislative Assembly of Manitoba as a Liberal.

He was born in Lanark County, Ontario, the son of Thomas Thompson and Grace Schuyler, both natives of Scotland, and was educated in Lanark County and at the Rockwood Academy in Wellington County. Thompson worked on the family farm and then was employed by the London Publishing Company until 1863. He then operated a book and stationery business in Toronto until 1875, when he was forced to retire due to poor health. After his health improved, in 1879, he came to Emerson, Manitoba and then settled on a homestead at Rock Lake on the Pembina River. In 1881, Thompson married Isabella Butchart. He served as a justice of the peace and was reeve for the Rural Municipality of Louise and warden for Rock Lake County. Thompson was defeated when he ran for reelection to the provincial assembly in 1888.

After leaving politics, Thompson moved to Glenboro, where he dealt in lumber, furniture and agricultural implements. In 1897, he became a representative for the Westminster Publishing Company. From 1899 to 1904, he was an inspector of agencies for the London & Lancashire Life Insurance Company. In 1904, he established his own real estate and financial agency at Brandon. Thompson was also president of the Edrans-Brandon Pressed Brick Company.

He retired to Vancouver, British Columbia and later died there at the age of 85.
