= Nash Grose =

English judge

Sir Nash Grose (1740-1814), was a British judge.

Grose was the son of Edward Grose of London, and was born in 1740. He went to Cambridge University, became a fellow of Trinity Hall, and took the degree of LL.B. in 1768. He was called to the bar at Lincoln's Inn in November 1766, and became serjeant-at-law in 1774. For many years he enjoyed the best practice in the court of common pleas. On 9 February 1787 he was appointed a judge of the King's Bench, and was knighted. His growing infirmities compelled his resignation during the Easter vacation 1813, and on 31 May 1814 he died at his seat, the Priory, in the Isle of Wight. He married a Miss Dennett of the Isle of Wight.
