= Robert Thompson (Mississippi politician) =

Mississippi state legislator

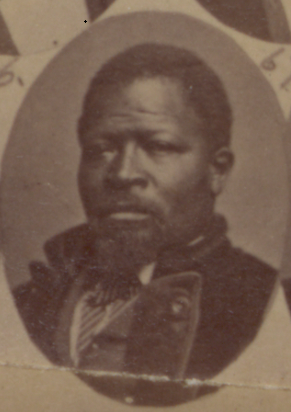

Robert Thompson (born c. 1830) was a state legislator in Mississippi. He served in the Mississippi House of Representatives in 1874 and 1875 from Lowndes County, Mississippi. He was born in South Carolina and worked as a laborer.

He served on a committee with six others to investigate contested election cases.

He later moved to Noxubee County, Mississippi where he lived with his wife Eliza and children.

== See also ==
- African American officeholders from the end of the Civil War until before 1900
