= Robert Tatlock Thomson =

Robert Tatlock Thomson FRSE FRIC (12 July 1855–1950) was a 19th/20th century British chemist and public analyst. In 1908 he was involved in the first legal definition of Scotch whisky.

== Life ==
He was born in Hutchesontown in 1856 one of five chemist brothers. His parents were John Thomson, a clerk, and Mary Kinnaird (née Tatlock). He studied Chemistry at Glasgow University.

In 1891, with his uncle the chemist Robert Rattray Tatlock (1837-1934), he joined the chemical analysis firm of Tatlock & Readman By 1896 he was a junior partner and the firm was renamed Tatlock, Readman & Thomson, being based at 156 Bath Street in central Glasgow. Thomson at that time lived at 37 Annette Street. The firm were experts on the adulteration of food and drink and compliance with the 1860 Adulteration Act.

In 1895 Readman retired and the firm became Tatlock & Thomson.

He was elected a Fellow of the Royal Society of Edinburgh in 1899. His proposers were Robert Rattray Tatlock, Alexander Crum Brown, Sir John Murray and Sir Arthur Mitchell.

In 1908 he and his uncle gave evidence to a Royal Commission within a dispute in the Scotch whisky industry regarding the legal definition of Scotch. This dispute was largely between the Highland malt distillers and the Lowland grain distillers. This created the first legal definition: it had to contain some degree of distilled malt and had to be distilled in Scotland. In 1915 it was also required that whisky be matured in barrels for a minimum of three years.

By 1911 the firm was still at Bath Street but Thomson was living in a far grander house: Esmond Villa at 6 Lethington Avenue in the Langside district.

The firm of Tatlock & Thomson Ltd still exists but is now based between Inverkeithing and Leven, Fife.

== Family ==
He was cousin to the younger Robert Rattray Tatlock

Thomson married Maria Louisa Ogden in Glasgow on 28 January 1881. They had 5 children: 3 daughters and 2 sons.

Maria died in Glasgow on 25 May 1927. Robert died in Glasgow on 20 February 1950, aged 94.
