= Catharine Dodgson =

British artist

- Born: Frances Catharine Spooner; 15 December 1883; Oxford, England
- Died: 30 April 1954 (aged 70); London, England
- Known for: Painting & drawing
- Spouse(s): Campbell Dodgson (m. 1913; died 1948)

Frances Catharine Dodgson (née Spooner; 15 December 1883 – 30 April 1954) was a British artist, known for her skill as a portraitist.

== Biography ==
Dodgson was born in Oxford. Her parents were Frances Wycliffe, who was the daughter of a bishop, and the academic William Spooner who became the warden of New College, Oxford and known for his spoonerisms. Dodgson enrolled in the Ruskin School of Drawing in Oxford at the age of 15 and went on to study at the Royal Academy Schools in London and also briefly at the Slade School of Art. In 1913 she married the Keeper of Prints and Drawings at the British Museum, Campbell Dodgson.

Dodgson did not develop her own art until the early 1930s. From 1933 to 1945 she exhibited regularly at the Royal Academy in London. She exhibited mainly portrait pieces, including one of her husband in 1933 and then of Dean Inge and Sir Thomas Barlow in subsequent years. Two solo exhibitions of Dodgson's work were held at Colnaghis' Gallery in London, in 1936 and 1939. Dodgson refused several offers of portrait commissions, preferring to ask friends and family members to sit for her. Later she made a series of drawings of dancers at the Covent Garden Opera and some landscape sketches of Regent's Park in London.

A memorial exhibition for Dodgson was held at Colnaghis' Gallery during October and November 1954. Both the Victoria and Albert Museum in London, the Ashmolean Museum in Cambridge and the British Council hold examples of her drawings. New College, Oxford has portraits by her of Herbert Hall Turner and H. A. L. Fisher.
