= Jean-Félix Adolphe Gambart =

French astronomer (1800–1836)

Jean-Félix Adolphe Gambart (12 May 1800 – 23 July 1836) was a French astronomer.

He was born in Sète in Hérault department, the son of a sea captain. His intelligence was noticed at a young age by Alexis Bouvard, who persuaded him to join the astronomy profession. In 1819 he joined the Marseilles Observatory and became the director in 1822.

During his career he recorded a number of observations of the satellites of Jupiter, and discovered a total of 13 comets. In 1832 he observed the transit of Mercury across the Sun, noting that the planet appeared deformed as it approached the edge.

He suffered from tuberculosis, and in 1836 died from cholera in Paris, aged 36.

The crater Gambart on the moon is named after him. He was also awarded the medal of the London Astronomy Society for his calculation of a cometary orbit.

== Notes ==
- Jean-Michel Faidit, Un astronome sétois : Jean-Félix Adolphe Gambart, (1800-1836), revue d'Archéologie et d'Histoire de Sète et de sa Région, 2008, pp. 39-45}
