= Robert Thompson (footballer, born 1878) =

English footballer

Personal information
- Full name: Robert Thompson
- Date of birth: 11 February 1878
- Place of birth: Whalley, England
- Position: Goalkeeper

Senior career*
Years	Team	Apps	(Gls)
1897–1898	Whalley		
1898–1900	Blackburn Rovers	9	(0)
Total		9	(0)
- * Club domestic league appearances and goals

Robert Thompson (11 February 1878 – ?) was an English footballer who played in the Football League for Blackburn Rovers.
