= Robert Thompson (chef) =

British chef

Robert Thompson MBE
- Born: 24 May 1981 (age 45); Bedfordshire
- Culinary career
- Cooking style: British cuisine
- Current restaurants
- RT Cafe Grill, 17 St. Thomas Street, PO33 2DL Isle of Wight
- Website: www.robertthompson.co.uk

Robert Thompson MBE (born 24 May 1981) is a British chef. He was in 2007 the youngest British chef to be awarded a Michelin star in his own right. He achieved this at Winteringham Fields, Lincolnshire before again earning a star at The Hambrough restaurant in Ventnor, on the Isle of Wight. Thompson left the Hambrough in 2013 and in 2014 began working at the George Hotel in nearby Yarmouth. In 2015, Thompson opened his first solo concept restaurant called Thompson's on the Isle of Wight in the town Newport.

== Career ==
Born in Bedfordshire England, Thompson was inspired to cook by brother Patrick and acquired a love of cooking at just 10 years old. After attending Thames Valley Community College, he started his cooking career with an apprenticeship at L'Ortolan in Reading then Sojourns at The Falcon and Chimney's Restaurant. He settled as a commis chef in 2001 at Winteringham Fields under Michelin chef Germain Schwabb winning the 2006 Acorn Award. Thompson was named head chef two years later at the age of 23 after Germain retired. Here, he was awarded his first Michelin star and listed as chef to watch for the future by journalist Jay Rayner.

After maintaining two Michelin stars and winning one of his own, Thompson departed for Waldo's at the Cliveden for one year, but was recruited to be the face of a hotel business on the Isle of Wight at The Hambrough in Ventnor. Four months after taking on head chef duties in 2008, Thompson won the Isle of Wight its only Michelin star and listed 20th best restaurant in the UK by the Good Food Guide as well as 18th in the Sunday Times Hardens Top 100.

In 2015, Thompson has opened his first solo restaurant in Newport, Isle of Wight named Thompson's Restaurant. Thompson's closed at the end of February 2024, and on 7 March 2024 Thompson opened RT Café Grill, an all-day restaurant at Royal Maritime House in Ryde. At the British Restaurant Awards it was named Best New Restaurant in the UK in 2024, and Thompson was named Best UK Chef in 2025.

He was appointed Member of the Order of the British Empire (MBE) in the 2023 Birthday Honours for services to hospitality, tourism and charity.
