= Warslow and Elkstones =

Civil parish in Staffordshire, England

Coordinates: 53°7′9″N 1°53′49″W

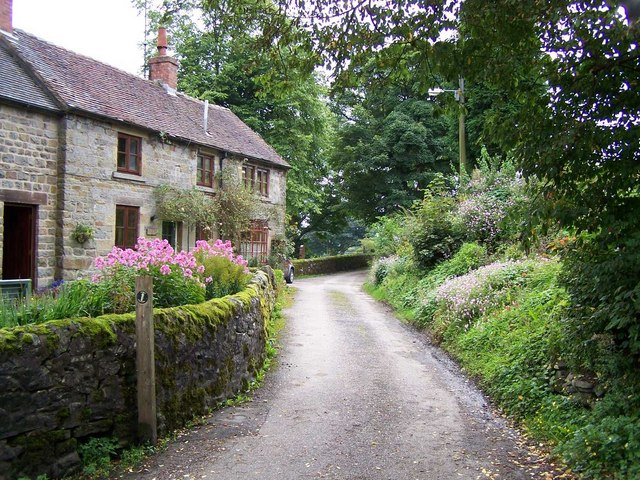
- Church Lane, Upper Elkstone

- Location within Staffordshire
- OS grid reference: SK 07 58
- District: Staffordshire Moorlands
- Shire county: Staffordshire
- Region: West Midlands
- Country: England
- Sovereign state: United Kingdom
- Post town: BUXTON
- Postcode district: SK17
- Police: Staffordshire
- Fire: Staffordshire
- Ambulance: West Midlands
- UK Parliament: Staffordshire Moorlands

Warslow and Elkstones is a civil parish in the district of Staffordshire Moorlands in north-east Staffordshire, England. It includes the village of Warslow and the hamlets of Lower Elkstone and Upper Elkstone. There is a boundary with Wetton in the east at the River Manifold. To the south is Butterton; the River Hamps forms the western boundary with Onecote.

== History ==
The National Gazetteer of Great Britain and Ireland in 1868 described Warslow as "a township and chapelry in the parish of Alstonfield.... The chapelry includes the hamlet of Elkstone.... Warslow Hall is the principal residence. Sir J. H. Crewe, Bart., is lord of the manor."

In 1988, an area of 908 hectares (2,240 acres) of farmland was recorded, of which 742.3 hectares (1,834 acres) was grassland and 151.4 hectares (374 acres) was rough grazing. There was dairy and sheep farming, with 1,244 head of cattle and 2,721 sheep and lambs.

=== Lead mining ===
Lead mining in the area was first attempted in 1717. A rich seam was discovered near Warslow village in 1766; it was soon productive, and was called Dale mine. The North Staffordshire Lead and Copper Mining Co. was formed in 1836; it operated at Dale mine and at other locations near Warslow. It employed 50 miners by 1849. The company was replaced by the Dale Mining Co. Ltd. in 1857, and by the New Dale Mining Co. Ltd. in 1868. Lead mining in the area ceased in 1874.

=== Buildings ===
Warslow Hall (grid reference SK091594), a Grade II listed building, was built by Sir George Crewe in 1830, replacing an earlier building. It was principally for the agent of his Alstonefield estate, Richard Manclark; it was also a summer residence for himself and his family. After Manclark's death in 1850, Crewe's son Sir John Harpur Crewe used the house as a shooting lodge.

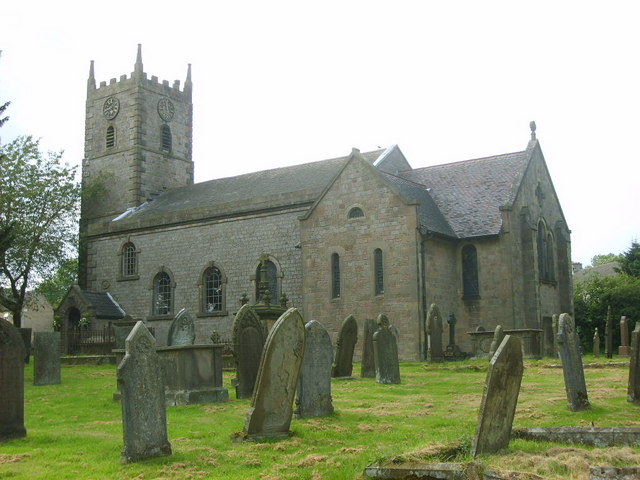
Church of St Lawrence, Warslow

The Church of St Lawrence in Warslow (grid reference SK086586) is a Grade II listed building. It was built in 1820, replacing an earlier church, from which a stone dated 1631 was reset in the east wall. In 1908 the chancel was extended, pine benches were added and an organ was installed; the modifications were funded by Sir Thomas Wardle and the architect was Charles Lynam. Stained glass windows by Morris & Co. were inserted in 1909, 1910 and 1920.

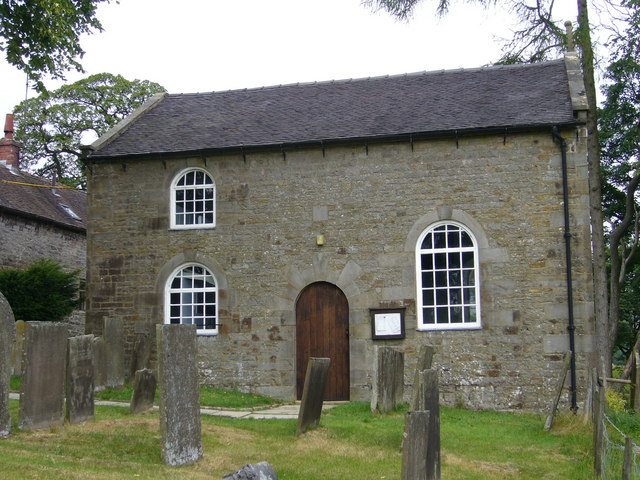
Church of St John the Baptist, Upper Elkstone

The Church of St John the Baptist (grid reference SK056590), a Grade II* listed building, is in Upper Elkstone. It is rectangular and has a bell-cot. A plaque on the east wall informs that it was "Built under the Care and Inspection of William Grindon of Stonfold", and that it was completed in 1786. The interior fittings date from that period.

Warslow has one pub, the Greyhound Inn; it was there by the late 18th century, when it was called the Greyhound and Hare. In the early 19th century, when many miners worked at the nearby Ecton Mines, there were two other pubs in the village, the Crewe and Harpur Arms and the Red Lion.

== Prehistory ==
On the northeast side of Warslow village is Blake Low bowl barrow, about 25 metres (82 ft) across. Brownlow bowl barrow, south-west of Warslow, has a similar size. They were investigated by antiquarians; a cremation, charcoal and flint tools were found in each case.

There are two bowl barrows on a hill south-west of Upper Elkstone, also investigated by antiquarians. The northern barrow, on which a trig point is situated, is about 24 metres (79 ft) across. There was an inhumation on the old ground surface, and elsewhere a cremation and flint tools. The southern barrow, about 28 metres (92 ft) across, was found to have an inhumation in a rock-cut grave, and another on the old ground surface where there were also flint tools.

== See also ==
- Listed buildings in Warslow and Elkstones
