= Vauncey Harpur Crewe =

British baronet

Sir Vauncey Harpur Crewe
- Sir Vauncey in old age
- Born: 14 October 1846
- Died: 13 December 1924 (aged 78)
- Spouse: Isabel Adderley (1852–1932)
- Children: Hilda Ethelfreda Harpur Crewe (1877–1949); Winifred Isabel Harpur Crewe (1879– ) Richard Fynderne Harpur Crewe (1880–1921); Airmyne Catherine Harpur Crewe (1882–1958); Frances Caroline Julia Harpur Crewe (1887–1960)
- Parent(s): Sir John Harpur-Crewe, 9th Baronet; Georgina Stanhope Lovell

Sir Vauncey Harpur Crewe, 10th Baronet (14 October 1846 – 13 December 1924) was a British baronet (see Harpur Baronets) known for his eccentricity and his natural history collections which he maintained at his home of Calke Abbey, near Ticknall, Derbyshire, England. He was named after an ancestor Sir Edmund Vauncey.

== Biography ==
Harpur Crewe was born in the family home of Calke Abbey to John Harpur (ninth baronet) and his cousin Georgiana Crewe. Like many wealthy people of the period, he was privately tutored and travelled widely even in his younger days. A marriage was planned in 1868 between him and Mary Clara, daughter of Evelyn Philip Shirley but this did not happen and he married Isabel, daughter of Charles Adderley, 1st Baron Norton in 1876. The couple chose to live separately although they had four daughters and a son together:

- Frances Caroline Julia Harpur Crewe
- Hilda Ethelfreda Harpur Crewe
- Winifred Isabel Harpur Crewe
- Airmyne Catherine Harpur Crewe
- Richard Fynderne Harpur Crewe (5 April 1880 - 14 June 1921)

Harpur Crewe served as a deputy lieutenant for Staffordshire in 1871 and was a High Sheriff of Derbyshire in 1900 but he largely stayed away from the public eye and spent time on amassing his natural history collections. He was seen as something of an altruistic monocrat, mixing great thoughtfulness and generosity towards his tenants and employees at his two seats – Calke Abbey in Derbyshire and Warslow-Longnor in Staffordshire – with aloofness and arbitrary behaviour towards his own family. His wife complained about the management of fires inside the estate. He insisted that fires be burnt at morning, noon and night to ensure the safety of his specimens. Failure to manage these fires would lead to the dismissal of servants via a message sent through a footman. He routinely went on collecting trips with his head gamekeeper Agathos Pegg. While out collecting on Repton Park, he once met his cousin John Harpur with whom he had a poor relationship and they had an altercation, following which Harpur Crewe had Repton Park burned down. When he found his daughter Airmyne smoking, she was sent off from Calke Abbey.

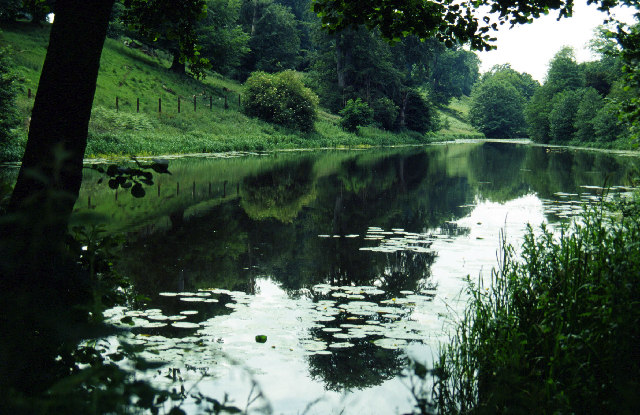
Calke Abbey grounds today are a haven for wildlife

Harpur Crewe put together a large collection of stuffed birds, bird's eggs and Lepidoptera. His collection included birds shot by himself, and rare or abnormally coloured specimens bought from dealers and taxidermists. He was considered gullible and many of the specimens he sold were of dubious provenance. His purchase of a great auk egg in 1894 for 300 guineas, a huge sum at the time, caused a public stir. By the time of Sir Vauncey's death, the taxidermy collection numbered several thousand cases. Although some of this was subsequently sold to meet heavy death duties, much remained at Calke, only coming to light sixty years later. He considered Calke Abbey as a bird sanctuary and did not allow the entry of motor cars into the estate and electricity was not installed even in his daughters' lifetime, and only after his death was the ancient plumbing system replaced. A possible explanation for this intense dislike of the modern world is that Sir Vauncey had been privately educated at Calke in his youth, and did not attend any public school or university. Accordingly, he did not possess anything in the way of an open mind, with isolation on the estate merely compounding his antiquated views and opinions. His isolationism reminded many of his ancestor Sir Henry Crewe, 7th Baronet, who has been called "the isolated baronet", known to communicate even with his servants only through written letters. Harpur-Crew sometimes communicated with his daughters through letters.

Harpur Crewe's son Richard, unlike his father, took an interest in motorcars and aeroplanes, but he was always of delicate health and died of cancer aged 40 in 1921, before his father. There were no further surviving heirs of the 1st baronet in the male line and, on the death of Sir Vauncey Harpur Crewe in 1924, the baronetcy became extinct. The estate passed to the descendants of Sir Vauncey's youngest daughter Frances, and in 1985 to the National Trust. His lepidoptera specimens were sold in 412 lots by Stevens' Auction Rooms. His bird specimens were sold in 6 lots.

Baronetage of England
Preceded by John Harpur-Crewe	Baronet (of Calke Abbey); 1886–1924	Extinct
