= Warslow =

Village in Staffordshire, England

Coordinates: 53°07′32″N 1°52′22″W

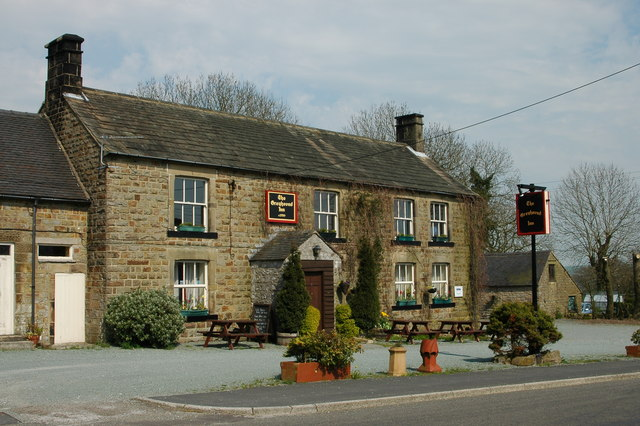
- The Greyhound at Warslow

- Location within Staffordshire
- Population: 320 (2011)
- OS grid reference: SK086586
- Civil parish: Warslow and Elkstones
- District: Staffordshire Moorlands
- Shire county: Staffordshire
- Region: West Midlands
- Country: England
- Sovereign state: United Kingdom
- Post town: Buxton
- Postcode district: SK17
- Police: Staffordshire
- Fire: Staffordshire
- Ambulance: West Midlands
- UK Parliament: Staffordshire Moorlands

Warslow is a small village in the Staffordshire Moorlands of Staffordshire, England. It is located in the Peak District National Park about 10 miles (16 km) north of Ashbourne. The village lies close to the Derbyshire border.

== History ==
Warslow is recorded as part of Alstonefield manor in the 1086 Domesday Book. In 1327, fourteen taxpayers (property owners) were assessed. The population grew in the late 18th century with the development of mining at Ecton, to a high point of 854 in 1821. Despite not having its own railway station, the village was served by the nearby Leek and Manifold Valley Light Railway which served Ecton railway station, near the hamlet of Ecton.

== Education ==
The village once had two schools, but due to the lack of children from the village itself and the surrounding villages only one of the schools is still used. The other is now the Boys' Brigade. Manifold Primary School (still in use as the secondary school until the early 1980s) caters mainly for children between the ages of 4 and 9; however, they do also have a nursery department which caters to pre-school children. On occasion the school will allow for a group of children to stay at the school for an extra two years, as opposed to going straight to a secondary school. The two main schools which the pupils will attend after leaving are: Churnet View Middle School and Saint Edward's Middle School, both located in Leek).

== Religion ==
The church of St Lawrence dates from 1820 and was designed by Charles Lynam. It has an unusually wide chancel and windows by William Morris. Lady Harpur Crewe funded altar cloths for the church. There is an earlier church depicted on the William Fadden map of 1799.

The village had two chapels, both now converted into houses.

== Springs ==
There are numerous fresh water springs located within the village and at one time this water was bottled and sold. The water can still be drunk or obtained freely from these sources.

== Buildings ==
The Grade II listed Warslow Hall, just off the B5053 north of Warslow village, was built by Sir George Crewe in 1830.

The village has a single public house, The Greyhound (formerly known as The Greyhound and Hare), which dates back to around 1750. It is located roughly in the centre of the village, across the road from the fully converted chapel. There is a village hall. Both the village post office and shop are now closed.

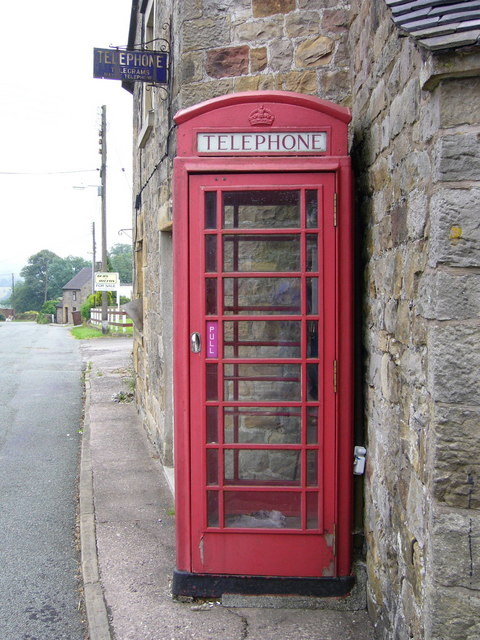
The telephone box in Warslow

== See also ==
- Listed buildings in Warslow and Elkstones
- Hulme End
- Elkstones
