= Calke =

Village in South Derbyshire, England

Coordinates: 52.795°N 1.448°W

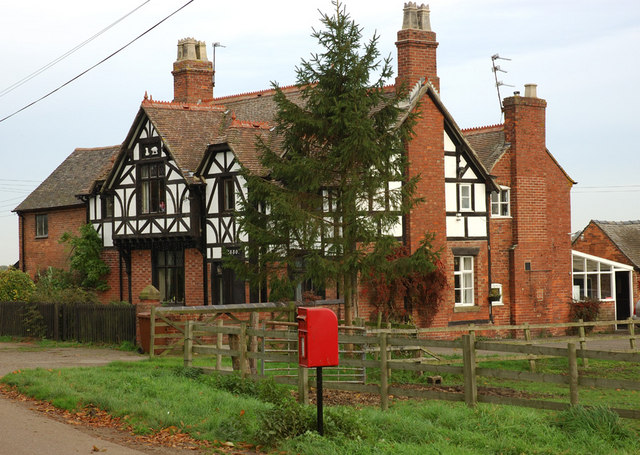
- The Gables, Main Street, Calke (2006)

- Location within Derbyshire
- Area: 1.06346 sq mi (2.7543 km^{2})
- Population: 24 (2011)
  - Density: 23/sq mi (8.9/km^{2})
- OS grid reference: SK373220
  - London: 105.54 mi (169.85 km)
- Civil parish: Calke
- District: South Derbyshire
- Shire county: Derbyshire
- Region: East Midlands
- Country: England
- Sovereign state: United Kingdom
- Post town: ASHBY-DE-LA-ZOUCH
- Postcode district: LE65
- Dialling code: 01332
- Police: Derbyshire
- Fire: Derbyshire
- Ambulance: East Midlands
- UK Parliament: South Derbyshire

Calke is a small village and civil parish in the South Derbyshire district of Derbyshire, England. It includes the historic house Calke Abbey, a National Trust property, although the main entrance to its grounds is from the neighbouring village of Ticknall, where the population of Calke is included. The settlement name Calke means "calc" (Anglian) Chalk, lime, limestone. Results from the 2011 census shows Calke to contain around 10 households with a population of about 24.

== Geography ==
Calke is situated on the Derbyshire side of the county border with Leicestershire, between the villages of Ticknall 1.79 miles (2.88 km) to the north west, Breedon on the Hill to the east 2.02 miles (3.25 km), Ashby-de-la-Zouch 3.45 miles (5.55 km) to the south, and Swadlincote 4.72 miles (7.60 km) to the west. The soils are "Slowly permeable seasonally wet acid loamy and clayey soils", according to UK Soil Observatory results. The geology of the settlement on the eastern side of the Main Street is situated on Sandstone Sedimentary bedrock that was formed between 322 and 321.5 million years ago; the western side of the road is largely mudstone, siltstone and sandstone Sedimentary bedrock formed between 329 and 320 million years ago during the Carboniferous period.

== History ==
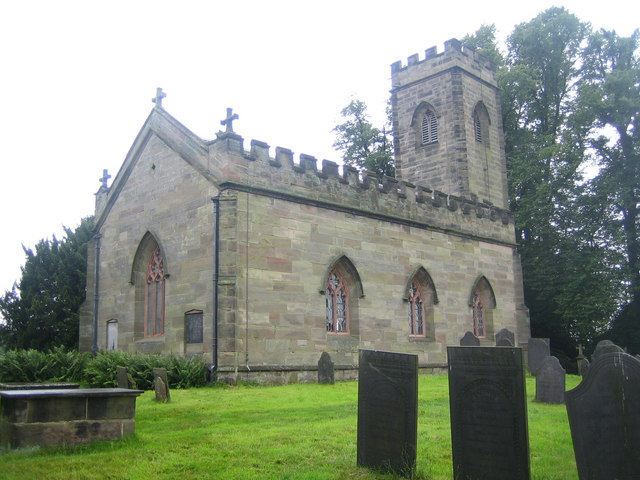
The Church of St Giles (2022)

The village Church of St Giles is a Grade II listed building and was rebuilt in 1826-8. The village of Calke (pronounced Cork) is clearly visible on the 1576 map of Warwickshire and Leicestershire, produced (in Latin) by Christopher Saxton as part of his Atlas of England and Wales, but no indication of village settlement size is shown.

In 1870–72, John Marius Wilson's Imperial Gazetteer of England and Wales described Calke as follows:

CALKE, or Caulk, a parish in the district of Ashby-de-la-Zouch and county of Derby; on the SE verge of the county, 4 miles N of Ashby-de-la-Zouch r. station. Post Town, Ticknall, under Derby. Acres, 880. Real property, £987. Pop., 78. Houses, 14. An Augustinian priory was founded here, in 1160, by the Countess of Chester; a mansion on the site of the priory, and called Calke-Abbey, was erected, in the early part of last century, by Sir John Harpur."

== See also ==
- Listed buildings in Calke
