= Listed buildings in Warslow and Elkstones =

Warslow and Elkstones is a civil parish in the district of Staffordshire Moorlands, Staffordshire, England. It contains 22 listed buildings that are recorded in the National Heritage List for England. Of these, one is at Grade II*, the middle of the three grades, and the others are at Grade II, the lowest grade. The parish contains the villages of Warslow and Elkstones, and is otherwise rural. Most of the listed buildings are houses and associated structures, cottages, farmhouses and farm buildings. The other listed buildings include two churches, a chapel, parts of a churchyard cross, and a bridge.

== Key ==
Grade	Criteria
II*	Particularly important buildings of more than special interest
II	Buildings of national importance and special interest

== Buildings ==
Name and location	Photograph	Date	Notes	Grade
Cross base and shaft 53.12481°N 1.87248°W	—	15th century (probable)	The parts of the cross are in the churchyard of St Laurence's Church, immediately to the south of the church. They are in gritstone, and consist of a roughly square base, and a roughly elliptical shaft that has been truncated. The shaft does not belong to the base, and has probably been moved from elsewhere.	II
The Hill and Hill Farmhouse; 53.11533°N 1.90230°W	—	17th century (probable)	A house that was later altered, it is in stone with quoins, and has a tile roof with a coped verge to the west. There are two storeys and four bays. The doorway has an arched head, the windows are mullioned with casements, and the doorway and ground floor windows have hood moulds.	II
Dale Bridge; 53.12310°N 1.85986°W		18th century	The bridge carries a road over the River Manifold. It is in stone, and consists of a single semi-elliptical arch. The bridge has rusticated voussoirs, a string course, and a coped parapet which sweeps round to squat end piers with pyramidal caps.	II
Rose Cottage and Trees Cottage; 53.12472°N 1.87308°W	—	18th century	A pair of stone cottages with a tile roof, two storeys, and three bays. The windows are mullioned and contain casements.	II
St John the Baptist's Church; 53.12790°N 1.91729°W		1786	The church is in stone with a tile roof, and consists of a nave and chancel in one unit. On the west gable is a squat louvred bellcote with a pyramidal roof. The doorway and windows on the sides have round heads, above the door is a datestone, and the windows have keystones. At the east end is a Venetian window, and inside there is a double-decker pulpit, box pews, and a west gallery.	II*
School and attached house 53.12428°N 1.87176°W		1788	The house is the older part, with the school added to the east in the 19th century. The buildings are in stone with quoins, and roof of tile and stone slate with coped verges. The house has two storeys and two bays, mullioned windows, and an inscription over a blocked doorway. The school is higher, with two storeys and four bays, the left bay gabled and with a single-storey extension protruding from it. The windows are mullioned, some having lights with pointed heads.	II
Smithy Cottage; 53.12567°N 1.87222°W	—	1811	A stone cottage with a tile roof, two storeys, two bays, and a rear extension. The doorway has a dated lintel, the mullioned windows contain sashes, and there is a fire window in the right gable end.	II
St Laurence's Church; 53.12489°N 1.87242°W		1820	The chancel was added in 1908. The church is built in stone and has tile roofs. It consists of a nave, a south porch, a south transept, a chancel, a north vestry, and a west tower. The tower has three stages, a west doorway, clock faces, and an embattled parapet with corner finials. Most of the windows are round-headed, there are square windows in the tower, and a lunette in the transept. Inside, there is a west gallery.	II
Outbuildings and wall northwest of Warslow Hall; 53.13241°N 1.86629°W	—	1820	The outbuildings are in stone with quoins and hipped stone slate roofs, and consist of a coach house, stables, and ostler's accommodation. They form three ranges, and together with a coped wall enclose a courtyard. The west range has two storeys and eight bays, it contains carriage entries and sash windows, and on the roof is a square cupola with a hipped roof and a weather vane. The north and south ranges have one storey, and the wall contains a small kennel arch.	II
Brook Roods; 53.12472°N 1.87356°W	—	Early 19th century	A house and an attached stable with a loft, it is in stone, the front is plastered, and it has a tile roof. There are two storeys and three bays, and the windows are sashes.	II
Hobcroft Cottages; 53.12472°N 1.86888°W	—	Early 19th century	A pair of stone cottages with quoins, and a tile roof with coped verges. There are two storeys and three bays. The windows are casements, those in the ground floor with mullions and hood moulds, and there are two doorways, also with hood moulds.	II
Hobcroft Farmhouse and Smalley's Stores; 53.12482°N 1.86912°W	—	Early 19th century	A house and a farmhouse in stone with quoins, and tile roofs with coped verges. They form an L-shaped plan with two ranges at right angles, and each has a rear wing and two storeys. The main range has three bays, a floor band, and a moulded eaves course. There are two doorways, each with a rusticated surround, a raised keystone, and a bracketed moulded hood. The windows are sashes, those in the ground floor with rusticated surrounds, and lintels grooved as voussoirs. The other range is lower, with two bays, sash windows, and a doorway with a flat hood. At the gable end is a flight of steps.	II
Longcroft; 53.12499°N 1.86948°W	—	Early 19th century	A stone house with rusticated quoins and a stone slate roof, hipped on the left, and with a coped verge on the right. There are two storeys, an L-shaped plan, and two bays. The central doorway has panelled pilasters with moulded caps, a semicircular fanlight, and a raised keystone, and the windows are sashes.	II
Warslow Hall; 53.13210°N 1.86573°W	—	Early 19th century	A stone house with a moulded eaves course, overhanging eaves, a hipped slate roof, and two storeys. The east front has three bays, and in the centre are steps leading up to a Doric portico that has paired columns and paired pilasters, a Doric frieze, and a doorway with a fanlight. The windows are sashes with slightly recessed moulded lintels. To the left is a low two-storey service wing.	II
Gate piers and walls, Warslow Hall; 53.13301°N 1.86626°W	—	Early 19th century	The gate piers at the entrance to the drive are in rusticated stone, and each has a square section, a moulded cornice, and a finial. They are flanked by coped walls about 10 yards (9.1 m) long, that are ramped down to the gate piers.	II
Former stables, cartsheds and hayloft, Cowlow Farm; 53.13116°N 1.85117°W	—	1832	The outbuildings are in stone with quoins, and have a tile roof with coped verges. They consist of former stables, cartsheds, and a hayloft. There are two storeys and an L-shaped plan. The buildings contain cartshed openings, windows, loft doors, pitching holes, and a datestone.	II
Warslow Methodist Chapel, wall, railings, gate and gate piers 53.12687°N 1.87690°W		1848	The chapel is in stone with a tile roof, and consists of a single cell. The round-headed doorway has a reeded surround and a keystone with a cross motif, and above it is a datestone. On each side are two round-headed windows. The forecourt is enclosed on the sides by coped stone walls that have corner piers with pyramidal caps, and at the front is a dwarf stone wall with cast iron railings. In the centre is a wrought iron gate flanked by square stone piers with pyramidal caps.	II
Grouse Farmhouse; 53.12502°N 1.87367°W	—	Mid 19th century	A farmhouse, later divided into two dwellings, it is in stone and has a slate roof with coped verges. There are two storeys, four bays, a low extension to the left, and a 20th-century lean-to garage on the right. The windows are sashes, and to the right are ventilation slits.	II
The Vicarage; 53.12265°N 1.87560°W	—	Mid 19th century	The vicarage, later a private house, is in stone with quoins, and has a tile roof with coped verge on kneelers. It is in Gothick style, and has two storeys and an attic, and a front of three bays, the outer bays having crow-stepped gables. The middle bay has an embattled parapet, and steps lead to an entrance containing a pair of octagonal columns with moulded caps, a segmental arch with a keystone, and narrow flanking arches. The windows are sashes with hood moulds, the upper lights with Gothic glazing, and in the attic are small fixed windows.	II
Dutch barn north of Warslow Hall; 53.13268°N 1.86599°W	—	Mid 19th century	The Dutch barn is in stone and has a stone slate roof. There are six bays, on the south side three bays are open, and the left bay has a loft. On the north side is a blocked round-headed carriage arch with a keystone, and there are two rows of six ventilation slits.	II
Cowlow Farmhouse; 53.13097°N 1.85146°W	—	1860	The farmhouse is in stone with rusticated quoins and a pyramidal slate roof. There are two storeys and a square plan. The southeast front has two bays, a central doorway with an oblong fanlight, a fluted keystone, and a flat hood on console brackets. The windows are sashes with lintels grooved as voussoirs, those in the ground floor with hood moulds. In the northeast front is a doorway with a Tudor arch.	II
Honeysuckle Cottage and Ivy Cottage; 53.12486°N 1.87378°W	—	Mid to late 19th century	Originally a row of four cottages, later converted into two. They are in stone and have slate roofs with coped verges. There are two storeys and five bays. One of the windows is a sash, the others are casements, and the windows in the ground floor have hood moulds. There are two doorways with segmental heads; of the other doorways, one is blocked, and the other contains an inserted window.	II
