= Hulme End =

Hamlet in Staffordshire, England

Coordinates: 53°07′52″N 1°50′47″W

- Location within Staffordshire
- OS grid reference: SK 10630 59273
- District: Staffordshire Moorlands
- Shire county: Staffordshire
- Region: West Midlands
- Country: England
- Sovereign state: United Kingdom
- Post town: Buxton
- Postcode district: SK17
- Police: Staffordshire
- Fire: Staffordshire
- Ambulance: West Midlands
- UK Parliament: Staffordshire Moorlands

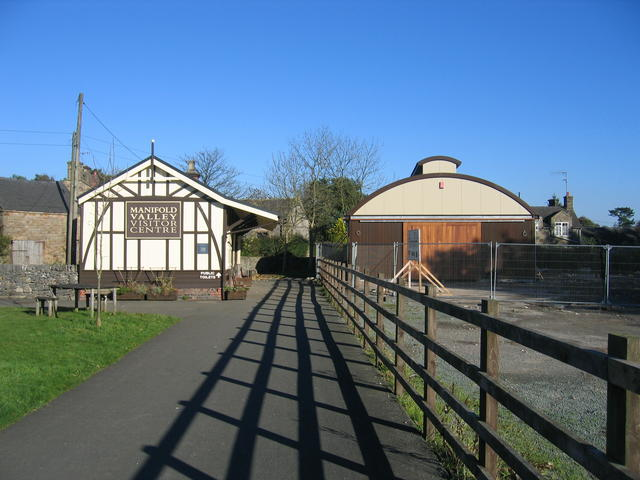
Hulme End station (left) is now a visitor centre. On the right is the rebuilt former engine shed; built to resemble the original, a small part of the original framework exists inside.

Hulme End (/hjuːm/) is a small hamlet in Staffordshire, England, in the Peak District National Park 10 miles north of Ashbourne, Derbyshire. A natural gateway to the Manifold Valley, the river crosses the road from Hartington (the nearest village) to Warslow.

== The Leek and Manifold Light Railway ==
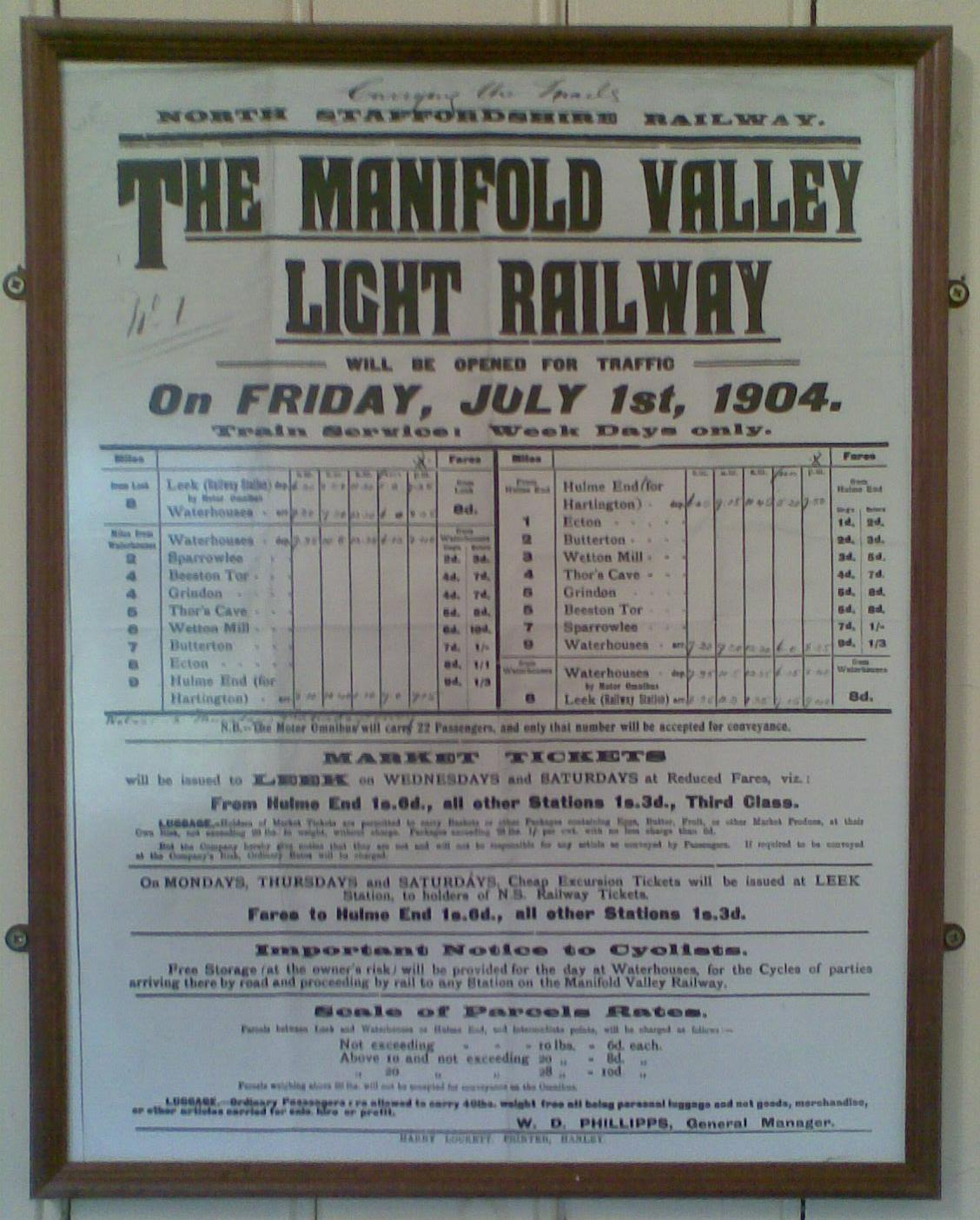
A timetable poster of 1904, now framed in the old station at Hulme End.

The hamlet's primary significance stems from its position as the northern terminus of the former Leek and Manifold Valley Light Railway, an independent narrow gauge (2 ft 6 in (762 mm)) line built following the legislation of the Light Railways Act 1896 which let companies to construct short lines to serve more isolated places.

The line primarily acted as a service for milk trains and tourism. On the timetable Hulme End was described as "Hulme End for Hartington" (Hartington is some 3 miles distant).

During the railway's lifetime there was some talk of extending the line northwards towards Buxton (10 miles to the north), whereby Hulme End, with its engine and carriage sheds, would have become a natural half-way point of the line, with probable considerable resultant growth - and survival of the railway - but this never materialised.

Today the old station building has been fully restored, complete with mock beams, and is now a staffed visitor centre, open most weekends and during school holidays. Information displays outline a brief history of the railway and there is a small collection of memorabilia from the line. The centre supplies the usual range of souvenirs, guide books, maps & leaflets. Within the building are public toilets, and there is a pay-and-display car park. A cycle hire centre opened inside the visitor centre in July 2019, known as the Manifold Valley Cycle Hire.

Adjacent to the station, the former engine has been rebuilt to a similar design as the original; a small part of the original frameworks exists inside. The former coach sheds, which similarly had two roads, have not survived. The rebuilt engine shed is now utilised as the Tea Junction cafe beside the visitor centre, open since August 2009.

In 1937 the former railway was re-opened by the County Council as the Manifold Way, an 8-mile tarmacked leisure route for walkers and cyclists, some of whom use the local campsite. The only such route in the Peak District to have a metalled surface throughout its entire length, it is also ideally suited to wheelchairs and prams, though in places the route forms part of the public highway network so shares motorised traffic on a single track lane. Hulme End, which is served by buses, is now the start point at its northern end.

== The Manifold Inn ==
The Manifold Inn, formerly called The Light Railway, is located beside the river Manifold. Despite its name, it is a 200-year-old coaching inn. Opposite the pub is the Old Toll House, which at one time served the turnpike and river ford. The bridge that the Toll House sits on was originally built in 1790, but most of the original bridge has subsequently been replaced due to damage and collapse. The current bridge has been there since 1819.
