= Ashfield baronets =

Extinct baronetcy in the Baronetage of England

Arms of Ashfield of Netherhall

The Ashfield Baronetcy, of Harkestead Netherhall in the County of Suffolk, was a title in the Baronetage of England. It was created on 20 June 1626 for John Ashfield, "Gentleman of the Privy Chamber to Charles I". The title became extinct on the death of the third baronet in 1714.

== Ashfield baronets, of Netherhall (1626) ==
- Sir John Ashfield, 1st Baronet (c. 1597 – 1635)
- Sir Richard Ashfield, 2nd Baronet (c. 1630 – c. 1684)
- Sir John Ashfield, 3rd Baronet (1654–1714)

Baronetage of England
Preceded by Dalison baronets	Ashfield baronets of Netherhall; 20 June 1626	Succeeded by Harpur baronets
