= Harpur-Crewe baronets =

Extinct baronetcy in the Baronetage of England

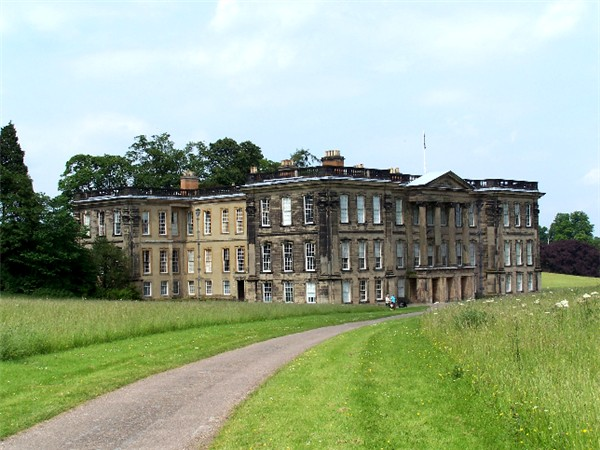
Calke Abbey, the seat of the Harpur Crewe family

The Harpur (later Crewe and Harpur Crewe) Baronetcy, of Calke Abbey, Derbyshire was a title in the Baronetage of England between 1626 and 1924. It was created on 8 September 1626 for Henry Harpur. He was a grandson of Richard Harpur, Justice of the Common Pleas, of Swarkestone Hall, Swarkestone, Derbyshire. The fourth Baronet was High Sheriff of Derbyshire in 1702. He married Catherine, daughter of Thomas Crewe, 2nd Baron Crew (see Baron Crew). The fifth Baronet sat as Member of Parliament for Worcester and Tamworth. The sixth Baronet was Member of Parliament for Derbyshire. The seventh Baronet assumed the alternative surname of Crewe in 1808 in commemoration of his ancestry. The eighth Baronet sat as Member of Parliament for Derbyshire South. The ninth Baronet assumed the surname Harpur Crewe and was High Sheriff of Derbyshire in 1853. The tenth Baronet was High Sheriff of Derbyshire in 1900. The title became extinct on his death in 1924.

The Harpurs and Harpur-Crews assembled a vast collection of natural history objects. The seventh Baronet probably started collecting birds as taxidermy specimens. His grandson, Sir John Harpur Crewe, 9th Baronet made large contributions to the collection. Not only birds, but also quadrupeds, fishes, and paleontological, geological and conchological material. Nowadays the natural history collection at Calke Abbey is one of the largest in its kind in the National Trust.

The Derbyshire estate passed down on the female line and in 1949 was inherited by Charles Jenney, grandson of the last Baronet, who changed his name to Harpur-Crewe. Inheritance tax problems forced the sale of the estate on his death in 1981 and in 1985 Calke Abbey passed to the National Trust.

== Harpur, later Harpur Crewe baronets, of Calke Abbey (1626) ==
Escutcheon of the Harpur Crewe baronets

- Sir Henry Harpur, 1st Baronet (1585–1638)
- Sir John Harpur, 2nd Baronet (1616–1669)
- Sir John Harpur, 3rd Baronet (1645–1681)
- Sir John Harpur, 4th Baronet (1679–1741)
- Sir Henry Harpur, 5th Baronet (1708–1748)
- Sir Henry Harpur, 6th Baronet (1739–1789)
- Sir Henry Crewe, 7th Baronet (1763–1819)
- Sir George Crewe, 8th Baronet (1795–1844)
- Sir John Harpur Crewe, 9th Baronet (1824–1886)
- Sir Vauncey Harpur Crewe, 10th Baronet (1846–1924)

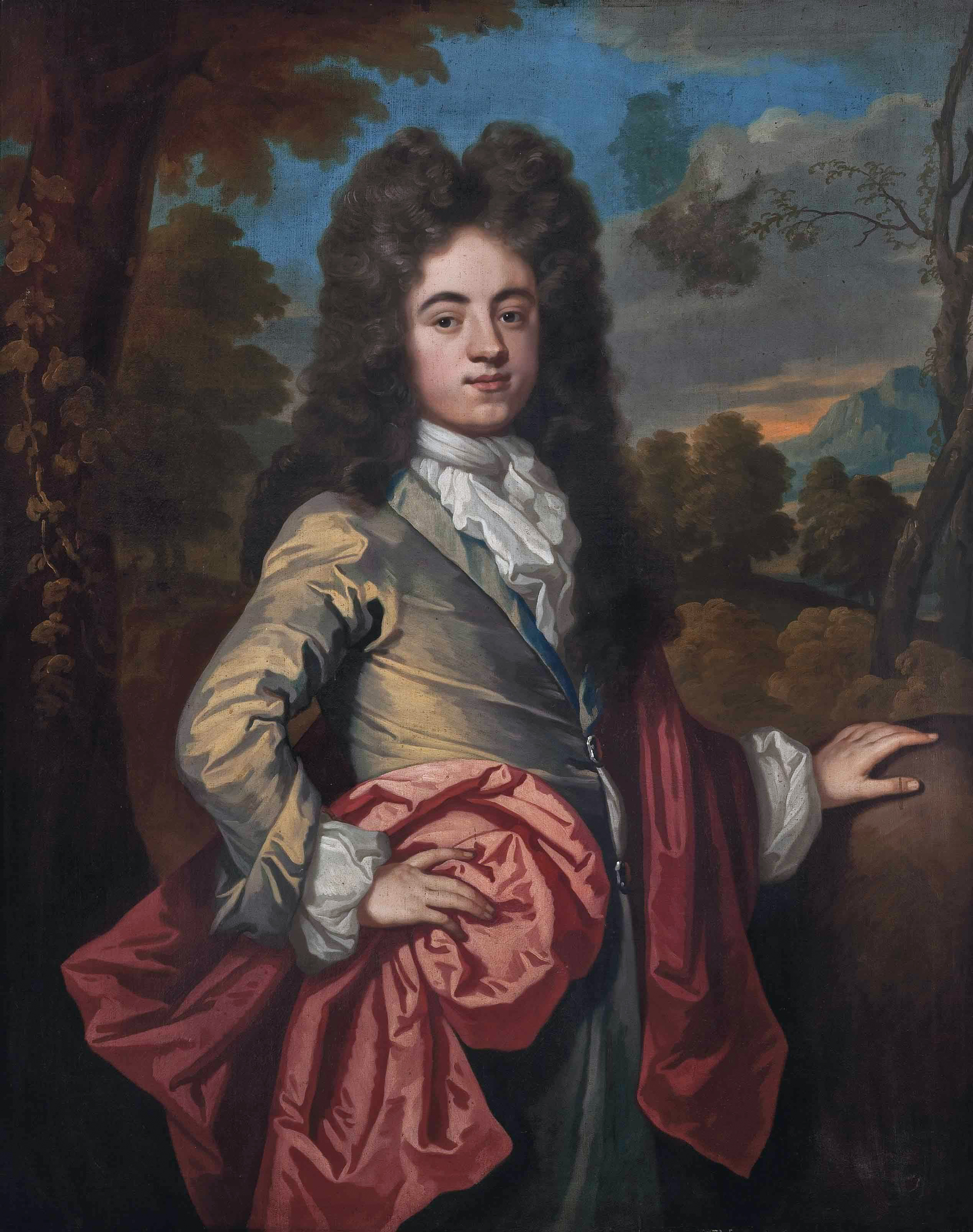
John Harpur, 4th Baronet (1679–1741) (John Kerseboom)

== See also ==
- Baron Crew

Baronetage of England
Preceded by Ashfield baronets	Harpur baronets of Calke Abbey; 8 September 1626	Succeeded by Sebright baronets
