= River Manifold =

River in Staffordshire, England

Manifold
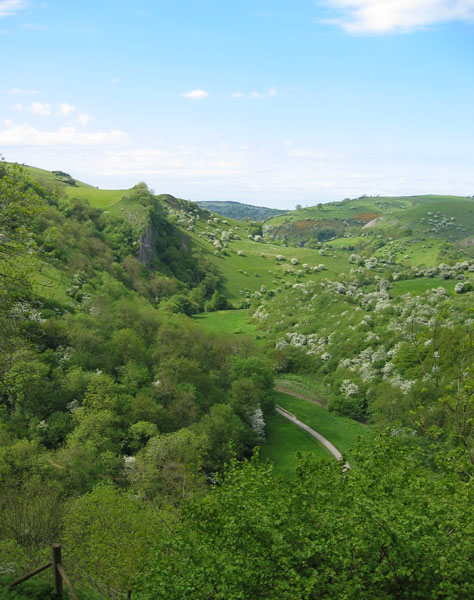
- Manifold Valley from Thor's Cave

Physical characteristics
- Source
  - location: South of Buxton near Axe Edge
- Mouth
  - location: Confluence with the Dove
  - coordinates: 53°3′0″N 1°47′5″W
- Length: 12 mi (19 km)
- Basin size: 9,111 hectares (22,510 acres)

Basin features
- Progression: Dove—Trent—Humber—North Sea
- Tributaries
  - right: Oakenclough Brook, Blake Brook, Warslow Brook, Hoo Brook, River Hamps

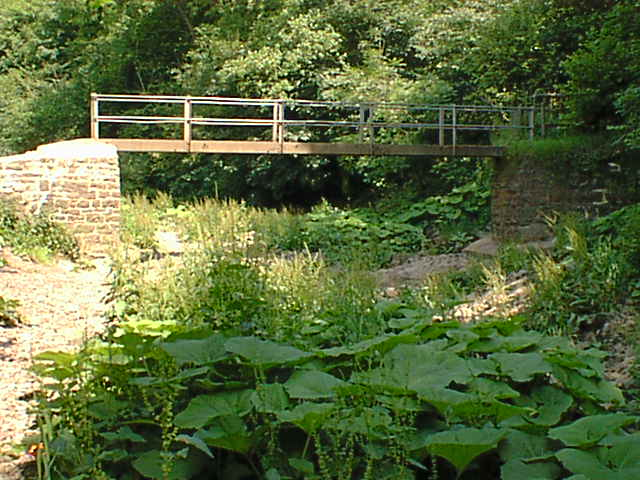
A bridge over a dry River Manifold, near Grindon

The River Manifold is a river in Staffordshire, England. It is a tributary of the River Dove (which also flows through the Peak District, forming the boundary between Derbyshire and Staffordshire).

The Manifold rises at Flash Head just south of Buxton near Axe Edge, at the northern edge of the White Peak, known for its limestone beds. It continues for 12 miles (19 km) before it joins the Dove. For part of its course, it runs underground (except when in spate), from Wetton Mill to Ilam. In this section it is joined by its major tributary, the River Hamps.

Villages on the river include Longnor, Hulme End and Ilam.

Its name may come from Anglo-Saxon manig-feald ("many folds"), referring to its meanders.

== Course ==
The river rises to the north of Flash Head, close to the A53 road, at an elevation of around 1,510 feet (460 m). It initially flows southwards, on the western flank of a large hill, and then eastwards along its southern flank. It is crossed by a minor road at Dun Cow's Grove, and turns to the south-east. It is joined by several small streams then, soon after reaching Hardings Booth, by Oakenclough Brook. This tributary flows eastwards and then turns to the north to join the Manifold on its right bank. As the Manifold approaches Longnor, there are sluices and a weir in the channel, which provided water to a mill leat supplying Longnor Sawmill. The two-storey, six-bay mill building dates from the early 19th century, and has been used to crush bones as well as sawing wood. It is Grade II listed and when it was surveyed in 1984, a cast iron overshot wheel and associated machinery were still in situ, while the building was being restored.

The nearby bridge, with one shallow arch, dates from the same period and is also Grade II listed. The B5053 road to the south of Longnor crosses the river at Windy Arbour Bridge, which is of similar date and construction. The river turns to the south, where the river channel was straightened between 1801 and 1838. This work has resulted in a section of river with poor habitat. The river resumes its meandering course southwards near Ludburn, and is joined by Blake Brook on its right bank. A minor road crosses at Brund Mill, and when the river reaches Hulme End, the B5054 road crosses on a 19th-century ashlar bridge with one arch.

The river turns to the west and the south-west. The former track of the Leek and Manifold Valley Light Railway crosses from the north to the south bank of the river. Dale Bridge is an 18th-century single-arched bridge carrying a minor road. The river at this point forms the boundary between the parishes of Warslow and Elkstones, and Wetton, after which ths railway track crosses the river again. To the east of the river are the extensive remains of copper mines on Ecton Hill. The mines were the first in Britain to use explosives to extract the ore, and were drained by a balance-beam pumping engine, thought to be the largest of that type to be constructed. Boats were used underground to transport the ore, which was then raised to the surface by rotative steam engines, designed by James Watt. The remains are a scheduled monument.

To the south of Ecton, the river is joined on its right bank by Warslow Brook, which rises to the north-west of Upper Elkstone and flows towards the south east and then east. Ecton bridge carries a minor road over the river below the confluence. It is a single arched stone bridge which is not listed. The next bridge downstream is at Wetton. It is an early 19th century packhorse bridge, with four semi-circular arches of varying sizes, separated by triangular buttresses. Shortly afterwards, Hoo Brook joins on the right bank. Opposite the junction are four listed buildings forming the Wetton Mill complex, including the grade II listed Mill House.

At Grindon the railway track crosses the river, and below the bridge is Darfar Bridge, dating from the early 19th century. It has a single elliptical arch. The railway track crosses back to the right bank shortly afterwards. Weag's bridge is also in the parish of Grindon and has a single semi-circular arch. As the river approaches Beeston Tor, the railway track leaves the river valley, to follow the valley of the River Hamps, which joins the Manifold on its right bank. Below the confluence, a footpath crosses the river by a series of stepping stones.

Rushley Bridge connects the parishes of Ilam and Waterhouses. It was built of coursed limestone rubble in the early 19th century, and has three arches. The centre elliptical arch is wider than the other two semi-circular arches. St Bertram's Bridge is an 18th century structure, which carries an inscription stating "Restored 1839". It has a single semi-circular arch, and connects the parishes of Ilam and Blore with Swinscoe. The final bridge on the river connects the same two parishes. It is made of hammer dressed ashlar, and has three arches. A little further downstream, the River Dove joins on its left bank, but the combined flow is named the River Dove.

== Milling ==
The river has supplied power to several watermills in the past. The furthest upstream was at Longnor, where a mill was used to crush bones and as a sawmill. The building was being restored in 1984, while in 1992 planning permission was granted to extend the building, and to convert it into a dwelling and some holiday accommodation. In 1900, Blakebrook Mill was shown on maps on Blake Brook, just above int confluence with the Manifold. There was a weir in the river further upstream, but the mill was already disued by that date.

The parish of Sheen is bordered by the River Dove to the east and the Manifold to the west. When records mention Sheen mill it is often unclear where the mill was located. Sheen Mill was mentioned in the late 13th century, when the Okeover family ran it. A new mill was built at Brund in 1602, and the Sheen Mill mentioned in 1735 referred to Brund Mill. Although being used for grinding corn in 1748, in 1790 it was a spinning mill. The Cantrell family were using it to produce calico, but the business failed in 1793. It then had a succession of uses, processing cotton in 1800, flax in 1834 and 1844, rope in 1851, flax in 1859 and corn in 1861. It was out of use in 1871 and 1881. The building was built of stone, with three storeys. Part of it collapsed in the 1960s, but between 1975 and 1984 it was restored and converted into a house.

Westside Mill was located just below Hulme End. It was in the parish of Alstonfield, and was a corn mill. Wetton Mill was opposite the junction with the Hoo Brook. It was a corn mill and ceased to be used in 1857. It has since been converted into two holiday cottages and a tearoom.

== Manifold Way ==
The Manifold Way is an 8-mile (13 km) long-distance footpath and cycle track from Hulme End to Waterhouses, along the former route of the narrow-gauge (2' 6") Leek and Manifold Valley Light Railway which operated between 1904 and 1934. Opened in July 1937 after the LMS handed over the trackbed to Staffordshire County Council, it is tarmacked throughout.

The Manifold Valley Visitor Centre is housed in Hulme End Station, which also has a model of the railway.

== Limestone crags and caves ==
The limestone cliffs that fringe the valley contain several rock-climbing areas, and named rock features, including Thor's Cave (grid reference SK098549) and Beeston Tor (grid reference SK105540), which overlooks the confluence with the River Hamps.

== Mining in the Manifold valley ==
The Manifold valley was famous for the mining of copper and lead, and the mines at Ecton were some of the richest in the country. The discovery of Stone Age implements in some of the caves imply that minerals were mined around the Manifold valley thousands of years ago. Nowadays there is little trace of the industry that made many people (mainly the Duke of Devonshire who at one time owned the Ecton Mines) very rich. The main areas of interest are around Ecton where the old spoil banks and the old engine house still remain.

== Ecology ==
The Environment Agency measure the water quality of the river systems in England. Each is given an overall ecological status, which may be one of five levels: high, good, moderate, poor and bad. There are several components that are used to determine this, including biological status, which looks at the quantity and varieties of invertebrates, angiosperms and fish. Chemical status, which compares the concentrations of various chemicals against known safe concentrations, is rated good or fail.

The water quality of the River Manifold system was as follows in 2019:

Section	Ecological Status	Chemical Status	Length	Catchment
Manifold – source to conf R Dove	Good	Fail	25.3 miles (40.7 km)	35.18 square miles (91.1 km^{2})
Hamps from Source to R Manifold	Good	Fail	15.7 miles (25.3 km)	22.42 square miles (58.1 km^{2})

The River Manifold section includes much of the Warslow Brook and a small part of Blake Brook. Before 2015, the chemical status was Fail, because of the presence of cadmium and its compounds. It was Good in 2015 and 2016, but cadmium and its compounds were again a problem in the 2019 assessment. The River Hamps is also affected by cadmiun and by nickel and its compounds, Like most rivers in the UK, failure of the chemical status was partly due to the presence of polybrominated diphenyl ethers (PBDE) and mercury compounds, neither of which had previously been included in the assessment.

The river has been noted as being important for European bullhead and lamprey. In the underground section of the river where it resurfaces at Ilam, the bullhead have no pigmentation. It was previously a stronghold for white-clawed crayfish, but most of the river's population were wiped out by crayfish plague in 2008. Crayfish have been noted in the tributaries of the Manifold and it is hoped that re-colonisation can be achieved by the surviving upstream crayfish.

== See also ==
- List of rivers in the Peak District
- Rivers of the United Kingdom

== Bibliography ==
- Baggs, A P; et al. (1996). "A History of the County of Stafford: Volume 7, Leek and the Moorlands". Victoria County History. British History Online.
- Jacklin, Tim (25 March 2019). "Advisory Visit – River Manifold, Staffordshire" (PDF). Wild Trout Trust. Archived (PDF) from the original on 4 December 2024.
