= Sir Henry Crewe, 7th Baronet =

Sir Henry Crewe
- Sir Henry Crewe, pastel work by Sir Thomas Lawrence
- Born: 13 May 1763
- Died: 6 February 1819 (aged 55)
- Spouse: Ann (Nanny) Hawkins
- Children: Henry (died at 6 months), Louisa, George, Selina, Henry Robert, Edmund Lewis and Charles Hugh
- Parent(s): Henry Harpur and Frances Grevelle

Sir Henry Crewe, 7th Baronet (1763 – 6 February 1819), born Henry Harpur, was the only son of Sir Henry Harpur, 6th Baronet, and Frances Greville, the second daughter of Francis Greville, 1st Earl of Warwick. He was born in 1763 and succeeded his father as the owner of the estate upon his father's death in 1789.

When he inherited his land, he became one of the richest landowners in Derbyshire, with an annual income of £10,000. His principal home was the traditional family seat of Calke Abbey, but he also took houses in the home counties to allow easy visits to London.

In 1792, Sir Henry married his mistress, a lady's maid called Nanny Hawkins. The marriage was described as an "unfortunate connection" by his mother, Lady Frances, and would have breached the usual conventions in society of the time.

He took the name and arms of Crewe by royal sign manual in 1808.

Sir Henry died in a coaching accident where he was thrown from his carriage and landed on his head.

Baronetage of England
Preceded by Henry Harpur	Baronet (of Calke Abbey); 1789–1819	Succeeded by George Crewe
