= Listed buildings in Calke =

Calke is a civil parish in the South Derbyshire district of Derbyshire, England. The parish contains 20 listed buildings that are recorded in the National Heritage List for England. Of these, one is listed at Grade I, the highest of the three grades, two are at Grade II*, the middle grade, and the others are at Grade II, the lowest grade. The parish contains the village of Calke, but is largely occupied by the country house, Calke Abbey, and its grounds. The house is listed, as are associated buildings, and structures in the grounds, including a church, an orangery, deer shelters, and an entrance lodge. The other listed building is a house in the village.

== Key ==
Grade	Criteria
I	Buildings of exceptional interest, sometimes considered to be internationally important
II*	Particularly important buildings of more than special interest
II	Buildings of national importance and special interest

== Buildings ==
Name and location	Photograph	Date	Notes	Grade
Calke Abbey; 52.79963°N 1.45582°W		1701–04	A country house incorporating earlier material, with the portico added 1806–08. It is in sandstone and brick, partly rendered, on a moulded plinth, with a floor band, a moulded cornice, and a balustraded parapet. There are two principal storeys and basements, and an entrance front of 16 bays, the outer three bays projecting and flanked by giant fluted Ionic pilasters on tall pedestals. In the middle three bays is a portico with four unfluted Ionic columns on a row of pilastered piers with a triglyph frieze. The windows are sashes with moulded architraves and keystones.	I
Stables and Riding School, Calke Abbey; 52.80018°N 1.45694°W		1712–16	The stables are the earlier part, with the riding school added in 1767–69. The buildings are in red brick with roofs of tile and Welsh slate. The stable block has sandstone dressings, a moulded stone plinth, quoins, a floor band, a moulded cornice, and a parapet, and consists of four two-storey ranges round a courtyard. The south front has 13 bays, the middle three bays projecting under a pediment containing a clock face, and has a rusticated segmental carriage arch. The windows have moulded surrounds and keystones, and the doorways have moulded surrounds and cornices. On the centre of the roof is an octagonal cupola with louvred openings, an onion dome, and a weathervane. The riding school has five bays divided by pilasters, each containing a three-light casement window. The entrance has impost blocks and a rusticated segmental arch.	II*
Home Farmhouse; 52.79774°N 1.45006°W		Early 18th century	The farmhouse is in red brick with a floor band, and a tile roof with coped gables and kneelers. There are two storeys and a T-shaped plan, consisting of a front range of two bays, and a long rear range of four bays. The windows are casements, most with segmental heads.	II
Grotto on North Side of China House Pond, Calke Park; 52.80255°N 1.45259°W	—	Mid-18th century	The grotto is in red brick, and is built into the bank of China House Pond. In the centre is a round arch with voussoirs, and this is flanked by rectangular windows with stone jambs, sills and lintels. To the left is a projecting bay with a round-arched opening.	II
Deer shelter, Calke Park; 52.79687°N 1.45701°W		1774	The deer shelter, which is now in ruins, is in red brick with quoins, and without a roof. There is a rectangular plan, and it contains four chambers, two open on one side. On the north and south fronts are three-bay arcades on circular stone columns with moulded capitals. In the gable ends are partly blocked Venetian windows and vents.	II*
Deer shelter (south), Calke Park; 52.79672°N 1.45678°W	—	Late 18th century	The shelter, which is partly collapsed, is in red brick with a tile roof. There is a single storey and a curved plan, with an open front carried on iron columns. At the rear are small square openings, and inside is a feeding rack.	II
Ice house, Calke Park; 52.80007°N 1.44961°W		Late 18th century (probable)	The ice house is in sandstone, it is set into a trough, and covered in earth. The doorway has a segmental arch and is flanked by curved wing walls. There are two barrel-vaulted chambers, each with two shoot holes in the roof.	II
Orangery, garden walls and tunnel, Calke Abbey; 52.79893°N 1.45171°W		1777	The orangery is in red brick with sandstone dressings, a moulded eaves cornice, and a Hipped Welsh slate roof with a dome. There are five bays, each containing a giant round-arched window with impost bands and keystones. To the south is an irregular quadrangular enclosure, and to the north a smaller enclosure, both enclosed by walls mainly of brick with some stone. The enclosures contain greenhouses, and there is a tunnel leading out into the park.	II
Heath End Lodge; 52.79113°N 1.45148°W		c. 1805	The lodge at the entrance to Calke Park is in rendered brick with a hipped Welsh slate roof. There are two storeys, a canted end facing the drive, and a lower range to the south. The porch has an open round-arched entrance on two sides and impost bands. The windows in the main part are sashes, and in the south range they are casements.	II
Gates, Heath End Lodge; 52.79116°N 1.45134°W		c. 1805	At the entrance to the drive is a pair of stone pedestrian gateways with round-headed arches. Each arch has a moulded cornice and stepped moulding above. The gates are in wrought iron.	II
Grotto east of Calke Abbey; 52.80056°N 1.45300°W		1809	A curved path leads down into the grotto sunk into a hollow. It is in red brick faced in tufa, and in sandstone. The grotto is a half-domed structure with two rustic arches.	II
Old School House; 52.79612°N 1.44873°W	—	Early 19th century	The house is in red brick, rendered on the front, with a tile roof. There are two storeys and two bays. In the centre is a latticed porch and a doorway with a rectangular fanlight, and the windows are sashes with moulded frames.	II
Outer stable block, barn and attached buildings, Calke Abbey; 52.80071°N 1.45724°W		Early 19th century	The buildings are in red brick and have tile roofs with coped gables. There are one and two storeys, and consist of two L-shaped ranges. In the south range is a two-storey smithy and dovecote flanked by single storey stables. The other buildings include a barn, a brewhouse, and ancillary buildings.	II
St Giles' Church; 52.79742°N 1.45374°W		1827–28	A private chapel in sandstone, consisting of a nave and chancel in one unit, and a west tower, all with diagonal buttresses and embattled parapets. The doorway in the west front of the tower has a pointed arch.	II
Wall, steps and gate piers, St Giles' Church; 52.79741°N 1.45408°W	—	1827–28	The rectangular churchyard is enclosed by low sandstone walls. On the west side, five steps lead up to wrought iron gates, flanked by octagonal piers with lancet panelled sides, moulded octagonal caps, and cross finials. On the north side is an inner wall with chamfered copings and urns. Another flight of steps lead towards the house, flanked by octagonal piers with urns.	II
Deer fence, Calke Park; 52.80068°N 1.45250°W	—	Mid-19th century	The deer fence is in wrought iron, and contains a pair of gates, and gate piers with ball finials. There are 15 bays to the south of the gates and 25 to the north. The fence is ramped up at the ends, with brick piers.	II
Joiner's shop and cart hovel, Calke Abbey; 52.80095°N 1.45682°W		Mid-19th century	The buildings are in red brick and timber with tile roofs. The joiners shop has a dentilled eaves cornice, a single storey, and four bays. The windows are sashes with segmental heads, and on the south gable end are external steps leading up to a segmental-headed doorway. The cart hovel to the north has ten bays, and is open to the west, with chamfered timber columns.	II
Mason's yard and office, Calke Abbey; 52.80050°N 1.45651°W	—	Mid-19th century	The stone mason's office is in red brick with stone dressings, and a Welsh slate roof with coped gables and moulded kneelers. There is a single storey, and the office contains doorways and windows that have wedge lintels and keystones. The yard to the south is enclosed by a brick wall with stone copings, and it contains a gateway with brick gate piers that have moulded caps.	II
Animal shelter, Calke Abbey; 52.80156°N 1.45735°W		Mid-19th century	The animal shelter is in limestone and sandstone, and has a pyramidal Welsh slate roof. There is a polygonal plan, with twelve sides, and engaged circular columns. The shelter contains three square window openings.	II
Chop House and Cart Shed, Calke Abbey; 52.80120°N 1.45740°W	—	Undated	The buildings are in red brick with a dentilled eaves cornice, and a tile roof, and form an L-shaped plan with two storeys. To the west is a chop house with external steps, and containing segmental-headed openings. At the right is a six-bay cart shed with circular brick columns and brick capitals, and to the south is a four-bay range.	II
