= John Harpur Crewe =

British baronet

Sir John Harpur Crewe
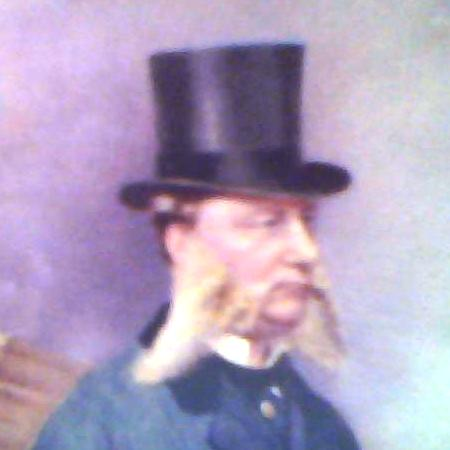
- From a larger painting of him outside Calke Abbey
- Born: 1824
- Died: 1886 (aged 61–62)
- Occupation: Gentleman
- Spouse: Georgiana Lovell (1824-1910)
- Children: Sir Vauncey Harpur Crewe, 10th Baronet (1846-1924); Alice Georgiana Harpur Crewe (1847-1920); Hugo Harpur Crewe (1858-1905)
- Parent(s): Sir George Crewe, 8th Baronet and Jane Whitaker

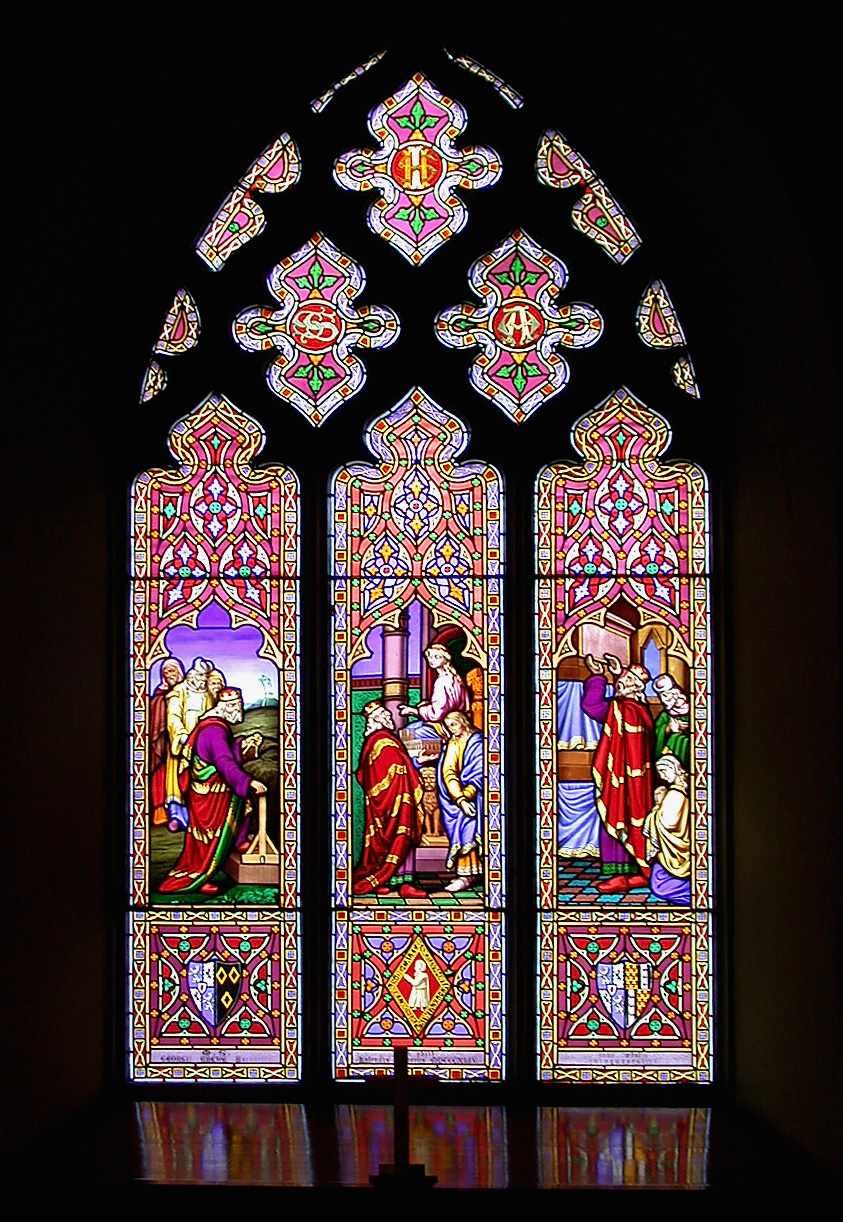
Heraldic window at Calke Abbey Church, showing the arms of the 8th and 9th Crewe baronets

Sir John Harpur Crewe, 9th Baronet (1824–1886) was a British baronet. He served as a High Sheriff of Derbyshire in 1853.

== Biography ==
John Harpur Crewe was the son of Sir George Crewe, 8th Baronet who had married in 1819 Jane Whitaker, daughter of the Rev. Thomas Whitaker, Vicar of Mendham, Norfolk. John was one of six children. The Harpur Crewe's family seat was at Calke Abbey, a house rebuilt by his ancestor Sir John Harpur, 4th baronet in 1701-04. He married Georgiana Jane Henrietta Eliza Lovell, a daughter of Capt. W. Stanhope Lovell, RN, KH, of Alverstoke, Hampshire.

Sir John served as High Sheriff of Derbyshire in 1853 but apart from this position he, like his son, played no part in public life. John Joseph Briggs, a local historian tells how 400 people signed an address to Sir John on the occasion of his eldest becoming 21. The address had been prepared by the local printers. Twenty people presented the paper. Sir John made a prepared speech as he complained of poor health. He did note that he had bought a property in Melbourne to ensure that his son could vote. The party afterwards was not attended by Sir John, however he did arrange for two cygnets to be delivered for the festivities.

He died in 1886 and was succeeded by his elder son, Sir Vauncey Harpur Crewe, 10th Baronet.

Honorary titles
Preceded by Sir Henry Sacheverell Wilmot Bt	High Sheriff of Derbyshire; 1853	Succeeded by William Drury Lowe
Baronetage of Great Britain
Preceded by George Harpur Crewe	Baronet (of Calke Abbey); 1818–1844	Succeeded by Vauncey Harpur Crewe
