= George Harpur Crewe =

English Tory politician

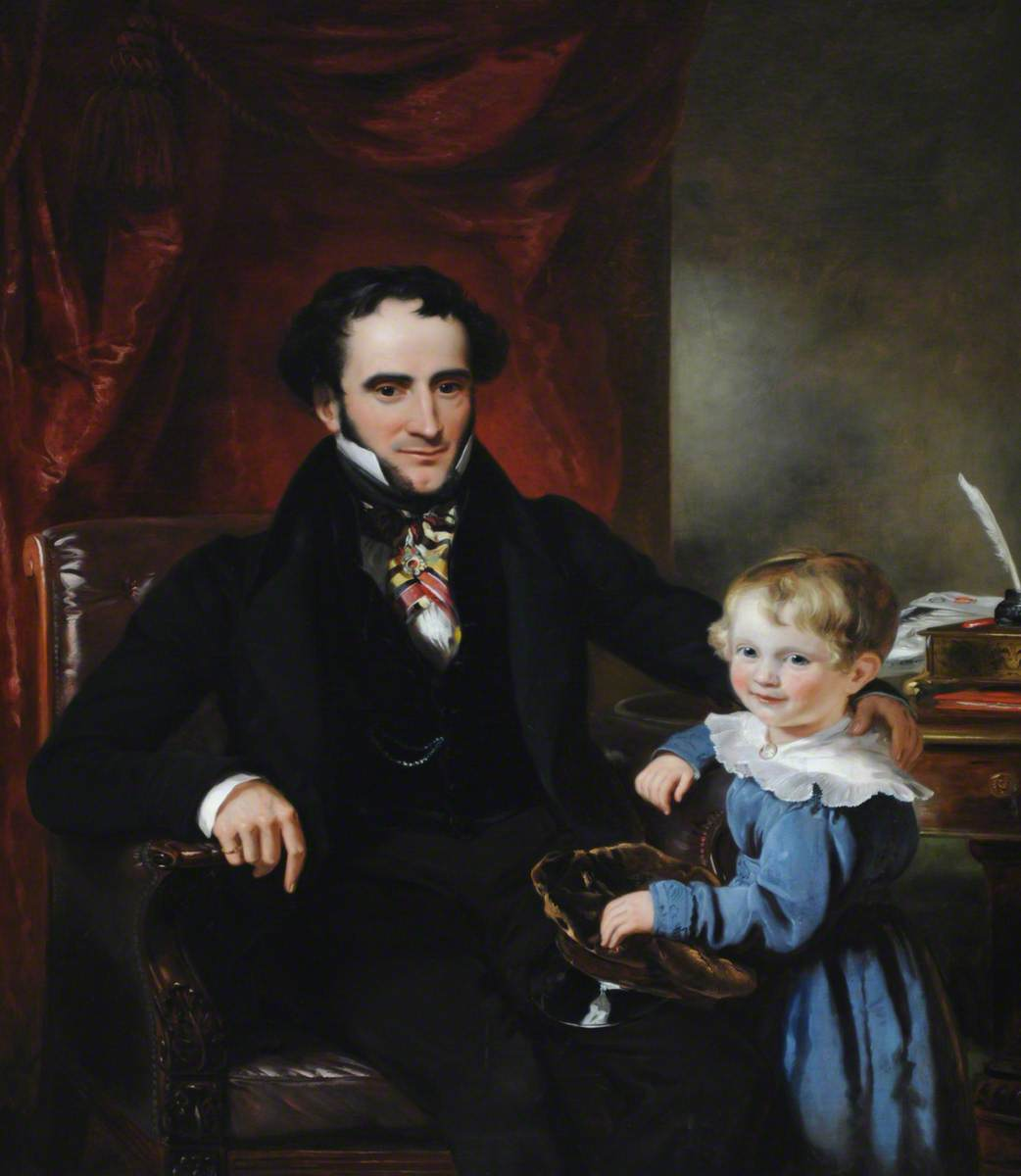
Sir George Crewe (1795–1844), 8th Bt, and His Son, Later Sir John Harpur Crewe, 9th Bt (1824–1886), by Ramsay Richard Reinagle

Sir George Crewe, 8th Baronet (1 February 1795 – 1 January 1844) was an English Tory politician who represented the constituency of South Derbyshire.

== Biography ==
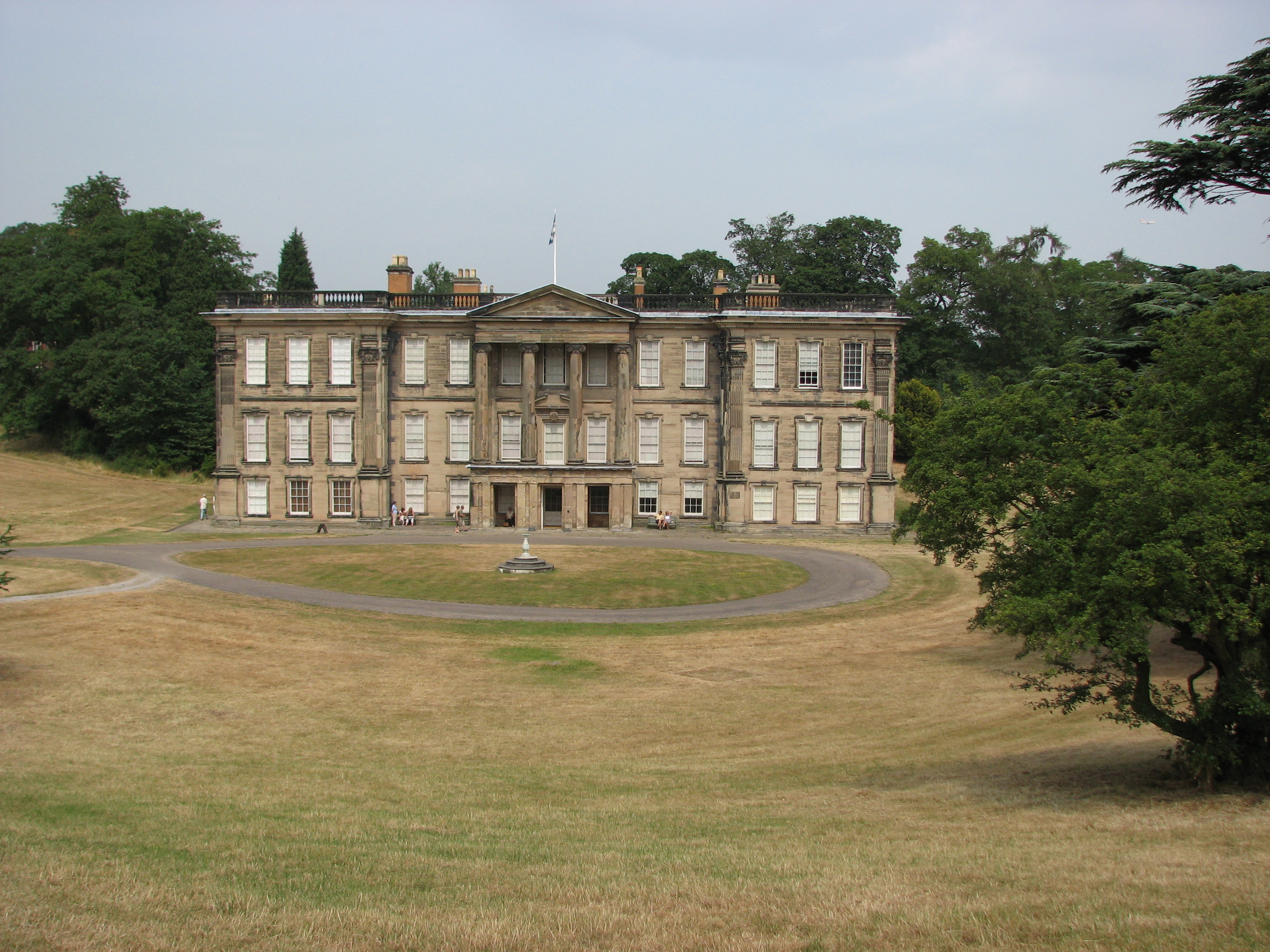
Calke Abbey main front

Crewe was the eldest surviving son of Sir Henry Harpur Crewe, 7th Baronet and his wife Ann Hawkins, daughter of Isaac Hawkins. His father took the name and arms of Crewe by royal sign manual in 1808. Crewe was educated at Rugby School. On 7 February 1818, at the age of 24, he succeeded his father, who died after falling from his coach box. He inherited the Baronetcy, Calke Abbey the family seat and extensive properties in Derbyshire, Staffordshire, and Leicestershire.

Crewe was called upon to serve as High Sheriff of Derbyshire in 1821, and one of his first acts was to do away with the Assize Ball publishing a letter "showing how cruel and heartless it appeared that any person should be found engaged in worldly mirth and amusement on so solemn an occasion, when so many poor creatures were trembling on the eve of their trial, perhaps for their lives." After several years looking after his estates, he was persuaded to stand as Member of Parliament for South Derbyshire in 1835, and was returned again in 1837. His health was always poor and he retired in 1841. Crewe was a considerable philanthropist with strong Christian principles, and was considered "too conscientious for a member of Parliament". Shocked by the poor conditions in which his tenants lived and worked he built schools and rebuilt the churches at Ticknall and Calke, staffing them with well educated clergy. The Harpur Crewe family were great collectors, and Sir George collected paintings, stuffed birds and animals. Harpur Crewe became the President of the Derby Town and County Museum and Natural History Society in 1836. This organisation became Derby Museum and Art Gallery.

He died at his home at Calke Abbey aged 48.

Crewe married in 1819 Jane Whitaker, daughter of the Rev. Thomas Whitaker, Vicar of Mendham, Norfolk. They had six children and he was succeeded by his son Sir John Harpur Crewe, 9th Baronet.

Parliament of the United Kingdom
Preceded by Hon George Venables-Vernon; The Lord Waterpark	Member of Parliament for South Derbyshire; 1835 – 1841; With: Sir Roger Gresley, Bt 1835–1837; Francis Hurt 1837–1841	Succeeded by Charles Robert Colvile; Edward Miller Mundy
Honorary titles
Preceded by Francis Mundy	High Sheriff of Derbyshire; 1821	Succeeded by Philip Gell
Baronetage of England
Preceded by Henry Harpur Crewe	Baronet (of Calke Abbey); 1818–1844	Succeeded by John Harpur-Crewe
