= Ecton Mines =

Copper mines in Staffordshire, England

Coordinates: 53.121678°N 1.856139°W

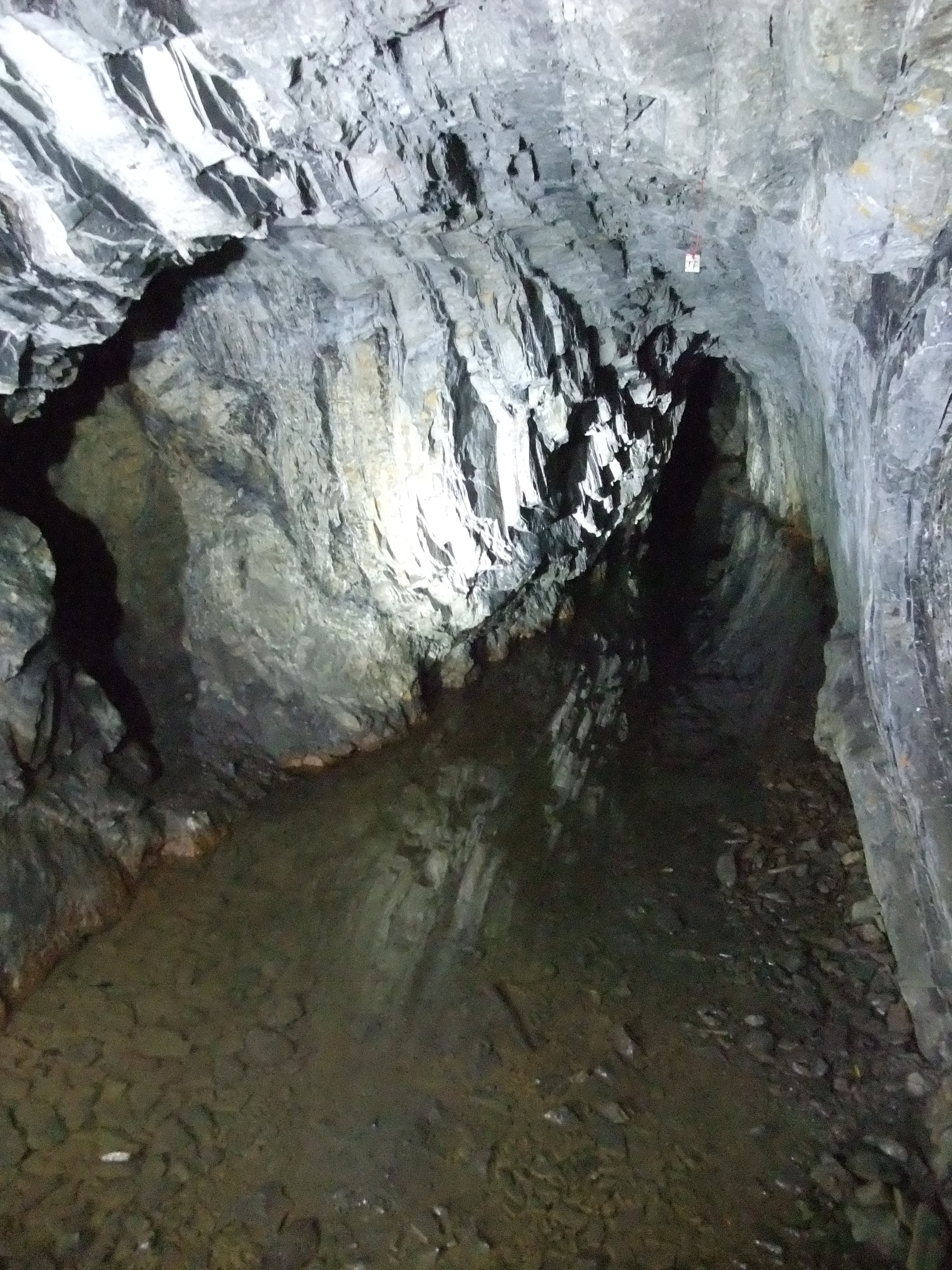
Pickering Gate, in Deep Ecton mine
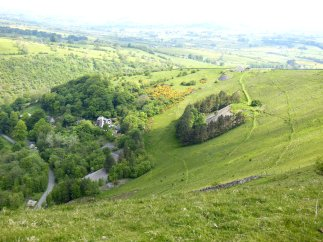
General view of Ecton Hill showing the Boulton & Watt engine house (upper right) and the G A Cox study centre (lower left)

A group of mines on Ecton Hill, Staffordshire, are unusual for the Peak District in producing predominantly copper rather than lead and zinc. The most important, Deep Ecton mine, has been mined since the Bronze Age, and in the 18th century was a major producer of copper, and the deepest mine in Britain. Mining below river level ceased in the 1850s, and all production stopped in the 1890s. The mine is now a significant educational resource, managed by the Ecton Mine Educational Trust, and with teaching provided by the Ecton Hill Field Studies Association.

== Location and geology ==
Ecton Hill is a historic mining area at Ecton, formerly a group of important copper-producing mines in central England. It is now a scheduled monument. It is located in the Staffordshire Moorlands area, where the valley of the River Manifold cuts through Lower Carboniferous limestones which have been subjected to folding and faulting during the Hercynian and Alpine orogenies. There is locally intense hydrothermal copper–lead–zinc mineralisation, unusual for the region in its inclusion of substantial quantities of copper.

== History ==
Section showing relationships of the mines: Deep Ecton, Clayton, Goodhope, Bag, and Waterbank (from left to right)

From Bronze Age times, the copper deposits on Ecton Hill were worked for over 3500 years, ceasing in 1891. During this time fortunes were made and lost. In the 18th century the Duke of Devonshire made a profit of over £300,000, said to have financed the building of the magnificent Crescent in Buxton. Total ore production is estimated at over 100,000 tonnes, mainly of copper ore.

The area is a Site of Special Scientific Interest (SSSI), and the Ecton mine itself is an underground SSSI. The rock exposures at nearby Ape's Tor provide opportunities for the study of geological structures, which can then be seen again underground, for example in Salt's Level.

The most important period of mining at Ecton was in the second half of the 18th Century, with the richest working at Deep Ecton, which was at the time the deepest mine in Britain. To work the near-vertical ore bodies, the miners used then state-of-the-art technology paid for from the profits made for the mine's owner, the Duke of Devonshire. The 1788 Boulton and Watt engine house on the ridgetop is believed to be the earliest surviving example in the world used for winding out ore.

In the 1660s-70s the mines were among the first in Britain to use gunpowder for extraction. The scale and depth of mining increased markedly in the 18th and 19th Centuries. There were two deep mines, Deep Ecton and Clayton, where different solutions to bringing up ore and pumping out water were employed over 150 years. Engines included those powered by horses, water and steam. At Clayton Mine from 1814 onwards there were underground steam engines that utilised the old pipe-workings above that ran to the ridgetop from the heart of the hill to take the smoke to surface rather than suffocating the miners.

From the 1790s onwards, when the main pipe failed at depth, Deep Ecton Mine was a shadow of its former self, with miners working in previous generations' leavings. Much of the story at Clayton Mine is harder to reconstruct in any detail. It is known that it was worked to a similar great depth, but this happened in the 1805-25 period when the Dukes of Devonshire took on mines across the hill and worked them together in an attempt to revitalise mining at Ecton. While it probably made a significant amount of money for a few years, eventually all again failed and the venture was abandoned. Perhaps all the previous profit was lost as subsequent unproductive workings were developed.

Deep Ecton was allowed to flood to river level in the 1850s, and all mining in Ecton Hill ceased in the 1890s. In the 1990s archaeologists discovered that copper mining at Ecton actually started in the Bronze Age about 3500 years ago: this is one of only two sites in England where this has been demonstrated.

== Ecton Mine Educational Trust ==
The G.A.Cox Study Centre, Ecton

Ecton Hill is now the basis for a significant educational resource. The Ecton Mine Educational Trust (EMET) has been formed with the principal aim of promoting education in applied geology, chemistry, mining and mineral extraction. Thanks to the generosity of Mrs Elizabeth Cox, the Trust is the owner of the relevant mineral rights of, and the Study Centre at, the 18th Century Ecton Copper Mines in the Peak District National Park.

The Trust provides the facilities for school and university teachers to bring students for one-day or two-day field courses that introduce young people to subjects relevant to the minerals industry.

Much of the educational work is carried out by a second organisation, the Ecton Hill Field Studies Association (EHFSA), which organises and coordinates the work of many experienced, qualified volunteers to provide courses at school and university levels.

EMET owns and manages the G A Cox Study Centre which can be used as a meeting place, a lecture room (with a capacity of 25) or a laboratory (with all the equipment required for the EHFSA courses and more). There is also a changing room containing the necessary safety equipment for underground visits. An outdoor meeting place/lecture area provides a pleasant alternative for fine weather activities. There is also access to Salt's Level for underground studies of the geology and the mining history. Other parts of the workings are also accessible but owing to insurance restrictions most visitors will only be able to visit Salt's Level. It is possible for specialist interest groups to explore the mine in greater detail (and depth) but only under strict conditions.

EHFSA has for many years run tutored one-day courses to support A-level science courses in Chemistry and Geology. Recent developments include one-day courses for GCSE students, Primary schools and general interest groups such as geological societies and U3A members. Both Chemistry and Geology courses focus on the application of these sciences to some or all of the following:

- the unusual copper mineralisation at Ecton, and the geological setting
- the mining of these ores
- the collection and identification of the minerals present
- the separation of the economic minerals
- the extraction of copper from these.

Courses can be tailored to the needs of different A level specifications on request, including fieldwork requirements for Geology and practical aspects of engineering geology. All A level courses provide the opportunity for an underground visit into Salt's Level to see the mineralisation, and understand how the miners were able to make the mine such a profitable enterprise.

The Trust's facilities are available to support the Schools Affiliate Scheme of the Institute of Materials, Minerals and Mining. This scheme aims to excite young people to the importance of careers in its fields, and in which there are 320 schools.

EMET is a consortium participant in the European Union Horizon 2020 project UNEXMIN to develop an autonomous submersible for exploration of flooded mines, and the Deep Ecton Mine will be the fourth pilot site in which the capabilities of this robot will be demonstrated.

Ecton Mine Educational Trust is a company Limited by Guarantee, registered in England, No. 555044, and a registered charity, no. 1112892.
