= Elkstones =

Hamlet in Staffordshire, England

Coordinates: 53°07′N 1°54′W

Elkstones is a small hamlet in the parish of Warslow and Elkstones, consisting of Upper Elkstone and Lower Elkstone. Situated high in the Staffordshire Moorlands, Leek is the closest town.

Elkstones falls in the catchment area of Manifold Primary School, Churnet View Middle School and Leek High School.

== See also ==
- Listed buildings in Warslow and Elkstones
