= Calke Abbey =

Grade I listed country house in England

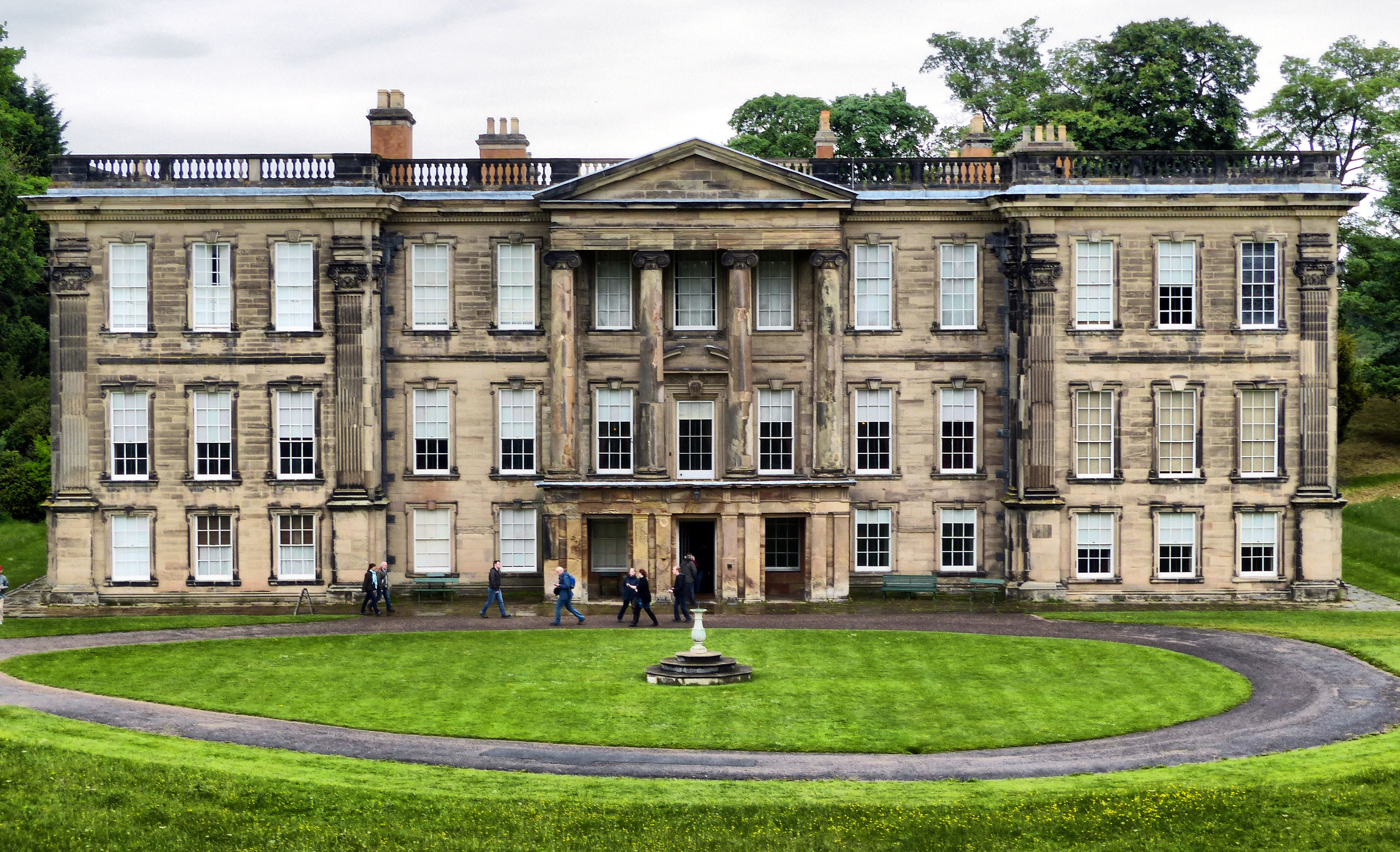
- Facade of Calke Abbey (May 2014)

- Location within Derbyshire

General information
- Architectural style: Neoclassical, Baroque
- Location: Ticknall, Derbyshire, England, United Kingdom
- Coordinates: 52°47′59″N 1°27′21″W
- Construction started: 1701
- Completed: 1704
- Owner: Harpur Baronets (Harpur and Harpur Crewe Families); National Trust (since 1985)

Website
- https://www.nationaltrust.org.uk/calke-abbey

Listed Building – Grade I
- Official name: Calke Abbey
- Designated: 2 September 1952
- Reference no.: 1031839

National Register of Historic Parks and Gardens
- Designated: 4 August 1984
- Reference no.: 1000676

Calke Abbey is a Grade I listed country house near Ticknall, Derbyshire, England, in the care of the charitable National Trust.

The site was an Augustinian priory from the 12th century until its dissolution by Henry VIII. The present building, named Calke Abbey in 1808, was never actually an abbey, but is a Baroque mansion built between 1701 and 1704.

The house was owned by the Harpur family for nearly 300 years until it was passed to the Trust in 1985 in lieu of inheritance tax. Today, the house is open to the public and many of its rooms are deliberately displayed in the state of decline in which the house was handed to the Trust.

== History ==
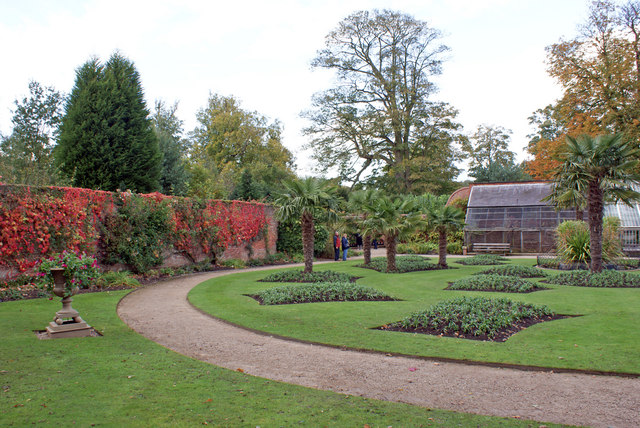
The garden

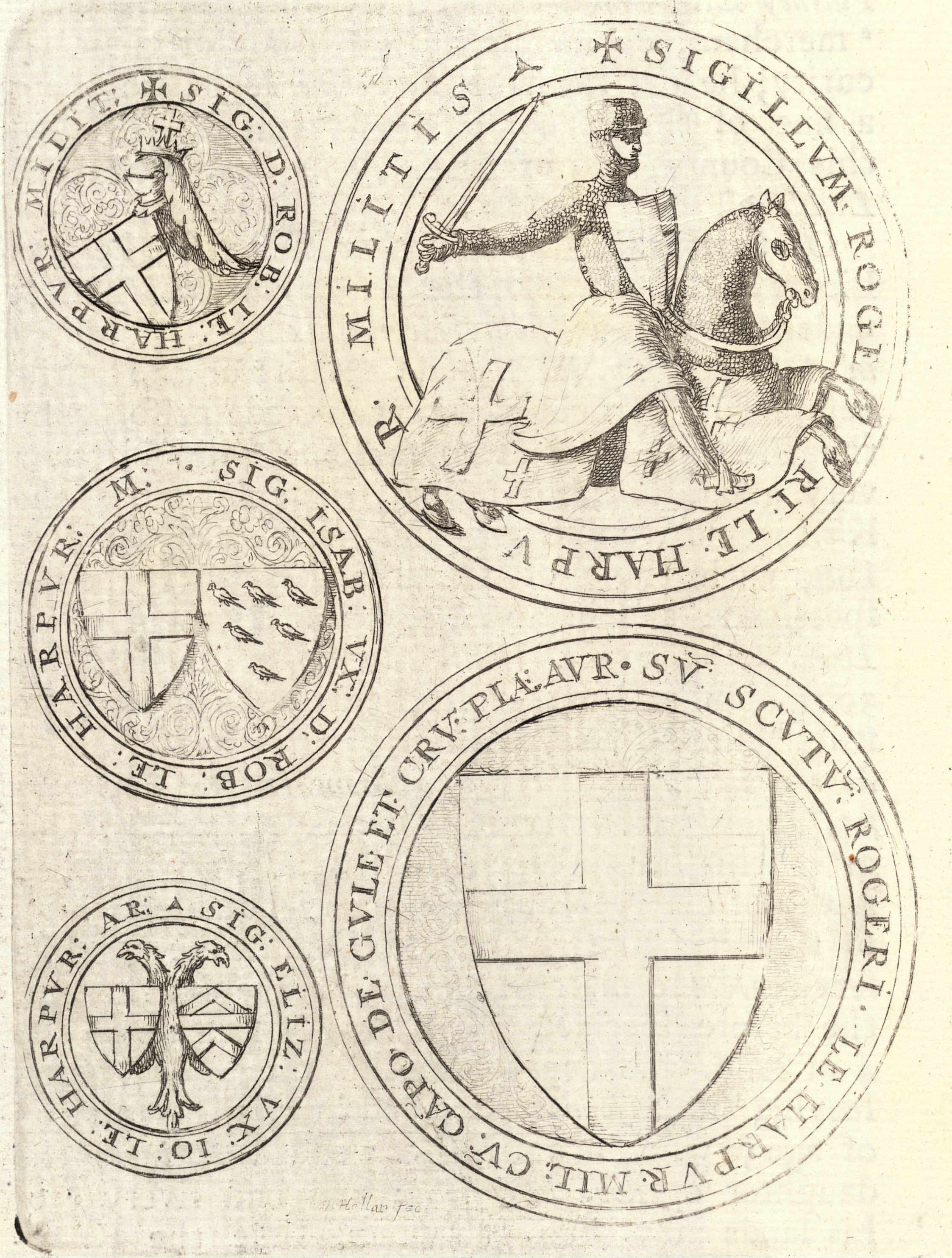
Seals of the Le Harpur family by Wenceslaus Hollar

Calke Priory was founded by Richard d'Avranches, 2nd Earl of Chester some time between 1115 and 1120 and was dedicated to St Giles; d'Avranches had inherited from his father Hugh vast estates in both England and Normandy, of which Calke and many of the surrounding villages were part. The Priory was initially an independent community, but after the death of Ranulf de Gernon, 4th Earl of Chester in 1153, it (along with most of his Derbyshire estates) became part of the dowry of his widow, Maud of Gloucester. Maud initially granted nearby St Wystan's Church, Repton to the canons at Calke Priory, but subsequently had a new priory, dedicated to the Holy Trinity, built at Repton. In 1172 she moved the Canons from Calke to the new Repton Priory, with Calke then becoming a subordinate "cell" to that priory.

Nothing is known of the priory during the 14th and 15th centuries; however, historian Oliver Garnett suggests the priory may have served more as the centre of an agricultural estate than as a religious establishment during this time.

During the Dissolution of the Monasteries of 1536 – 1541, Repton, along with other monasteries whose income was £200 or less, failed to escape the first wave and was dissolved in 1536. A reinstatement was possible through the payment of a fine and on 12 June 1537, Repton was reinstated, at a cost of £266 13s 4d. A loan to cover this huge amount was made possible by John Preste (Prest and other variations), a Master Grocer of London, for which he received from Prior John Young a 99-year lease dated 31 August 1537 for Calke Priory with various lands and permissions, stating 59 years being prepaid to reflect the amount lent. This lease appeared to secure Calke's future, but on 25 October 1538 Repton Priory was surrendered for the second and final time, and the freehold of Calke transferred back to the Crown.

=== Post-Dissolution ===
When Repton was dissolved in 1538 John Preste relocated from London to Calke along with his family for safety. He remained until Thomas Cromwell was beheaded in 1540. During this time John converted Calke Priory into a Tudor house and his family remained at Calke Manor until his death in October 1546. In his will John left the remainder of the 99-year lease for Calke, which included the Tudor manor, to his youngest daughter Frances, aged about 4 years, with his wife Alice having custody and acting as guardian until Frances became of age or married. It stipulated that if Alice remained at Calke she was obliged to pay rent and cover the necessary repairs. A further condition stated that the lease was for Frances and her heirs only – meaning when she later married William Bradbourne in 1557, he was not allowed to take ownership of Calke, as was normal practice in Tudor times.

In January 1547 Alice married Richard Blackwell, lawyer of the Inner Temple, London and ignoring the fact that the legal owner of the lease was Frances, took everything of value as his ‘by rights of marriage to Alice'. He named himself as Calke's owner in Queen Elizabeth's Pardon Rolls in 1559 and in his will Richard referred to Calke Manor as the 'Chief Mansion House'. Meanwhile the freehold of Calke was granted by King Edward VI to John Dudley, Earl of Warwick (later Duke of Northumberland), for services in Scotland. Due to the 99-year lease already in place for Calke, nothing was to be gained from this freehold, so he sold it on to John Beaumont of Grace Dieu and his sons Francis and Henry Beaumont.

Following the death of Richard Blackwell in 1568 (Alice having died in 1561) his executors retained the lease, despite the fact that it had been awarded to Frances in her father's will. Her death in 1572, without any heirs, precipitated a court battle about the rightful ownership until 1573/74, when lawyer Richard Wendsley achieved a settlement to enjoy the lease under the title of John Smyth and Grace (nee Prest). In 1585 Wendsley defaulted on loans made by Robert Bainbridge, three-time MP for Derby, linked to the freehold and the leasehold of Calke, so Bainbridge became the rightful legal owner of Calke. A final settlement was made to John Reames (Grace's 2nd husband) and Grace to release their connection to Calke.

Robert Bainbridge was an avowed Protestant who was imprisoned in 1586 in the Beauchamp Tower of the Tower of London for refusing to accept Elizabeth I's Church Settlement, and may have chosen to live at Calke as the parish was not under the control of a bishop. He requested that his body be laid to rest in the vault he had built in St. Giles Church. Following Robert's death, Calke passed to his son Robert Bainbridge Jr, who sold the estate in 1622 to Sir Henry Harpur for £5,350.

The Tudor manor forms the core of the house that exists today, and parts are still visible within the house's courtyard. Little was known about how Calke Manor looked until repair work on the current house was undertaken by the National Trust in 1988. The house was built around a courtyard with the south range serving as the entrance front, with a gatehouse; two projections in the foundations at the northeast and northwest reveal the locations of two stair-turrets. The work also revealed a later 17th-century arcaded loggia which were built next to both the stair-turrets. The east and west ranges of this house were not parallel; something that has distinctly affected the shape and layout of the current house. This discrepancy could either reflect the different phases of construction within the Tudor house or the layout and alignment of the walls of the original priory buildings.

=== The Harpurs ===
In 1622 the estate was bought by Sir Henry Harpur, 1st Baronet (c. 1579–1639). The Harpur family had become established in the middle of the previous century; descendants of Richard Harpur, a successful lawyer who had risen to become a judge at the Court of Common Pleas at Westminster and then Chief Justice of the County Palatine of Lancaster. He and his descendants acquired, through wealth and marriage, estates in Staffordshire, centred on Alstonfield and Derbyshire, centred on Swarkestone.

The house was rebuilt by Sir John Harpur, 4th Baronet (1680–1741) between 1701 and 1704. The house and estate were owned by successive Harpur baronets and were ultimately inherited by Sir Vauncey Harpur-Crewe, 10th Baronet (1846–1924), the last baronet, who was devoted to his vast collections of natural history assembled by the Harpurs and Harpur-Crewes at the abbey between 1793 and 1924. When he died, his eldest daughter, Hilda Harpur Crewe (1877–1949) sold some of his collection of birds, butterflies and fishes to pay estate duty. She was succeeded by her nephew, Charles Jenney (1917–81), who was the eldest son of Frances Harpur-Crewe, the fourth daughter of Sir Vauncey. Charles changed his name to Charles Harpur-Crewe. Upon his death in 1981, the property was passed on to his younger brother Henry Harpur-Crewe (1921–91), with a Capital Transfer Tax bill of £8m due on the estate. Henry Harpur-Crewe offered the property and its contents to the UK government to settle the tax bill, although the National Trust initially refused to accept the property without an associated endowment to pay for repairs and ongoing maintenance costs. There were several years of debate in parliament about the value of the property, with Lord Vaizey of the parliamentary heritage group describing it as full of "junk," but the government eventually agreed to provide an endowment and in 1985 the estate was transferred to the National Trust.

=== National Trust ownership ===
Set in the midst of a landscape park, Calke Abbey is presented by the National Trust as an illustration of the English country house in decline. At its time of endowment in 1985, there had been little change to many rooms for over a century. The last four generations of the Harpur family were reported to have been reclusive "retiring types and more than a little odd", rarely venturing beyond the grounds of the abbey and banning visitors; the last major redecoration of the property had been in 1841, plumbing had not been installed until 1930, and electricity was installed only in 1960. Local MP Edwina Currie noted in parliament that generations of the Harpur family "never threw anything away" and that "when a room was full, its members simply shut the door and moved on to another room," resulting in the property being a "perfect, undisturbed time capsule" of Victorian life." After transfer of the Abbey to the National Trust, a massive amount of remedial work was done, but no renovation, with the interiors left almost as they were found in 1985, so the decay of the building and its interiors was halted but not reversed.

The estate has occasionally been used for filming, including Peaky Blinders: The Immortal Man (2026) and BBC Two's Hidden Treasures of the National Trust (2026).

== Estate and natural heritage ==
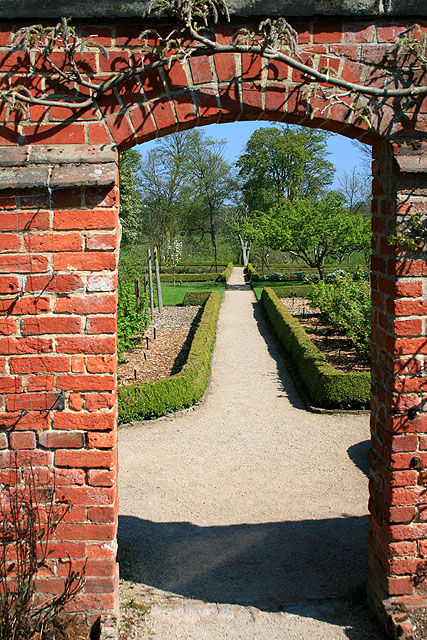
Down the garden path

The Trust manages the surrounding landscape park with an eye to nature conservation. It contains such features as a walled garden, with a flower garden and a former physic garden, now managed as a kitchen garden. The ancient deer park of the Calke Abbey Estate is a designated Site of Special Scientific Interest and national nature reserve, particularly noted for its rare wood pasture habitat and associated deadwood invertebrate fauna. The estate features hundreds of veteran trees, including a 1,000-year-old oak tree called the Old Man of Calke. The estate is also listed at Grade II* on the National Register of Historic Parks and Gardens.

To the side of the house is a large quadrangle of buildings forming the old stable yard and farm, complete with old carriages and farm implements. The outbuildings incorporate a brewhouse that is linked to the main house by a tunnel.

The limestone quarries on the estate near Ticknall are the end point of the railway that took limestone to the Ashby Canal at Willesley basin and one of the tunnels can be seen restored and running under the drive. The tunnel is now a scheduled monument. It closed in 1915.

== Church of St Giles ==
The original church was founded about 1100 by Harold de Leke and given to the priory. It was the parish church for the village of Calke from 1160 to 1834 when it became the manorial chapel. Now owned by the National Trust, it is still a consecrated church and the occasional service is held there. The church is a Grade II listed building.

== See also ==
- Grade I listed buildings in Derbyshire
- Listed buildings in Calke

== Gallery ==
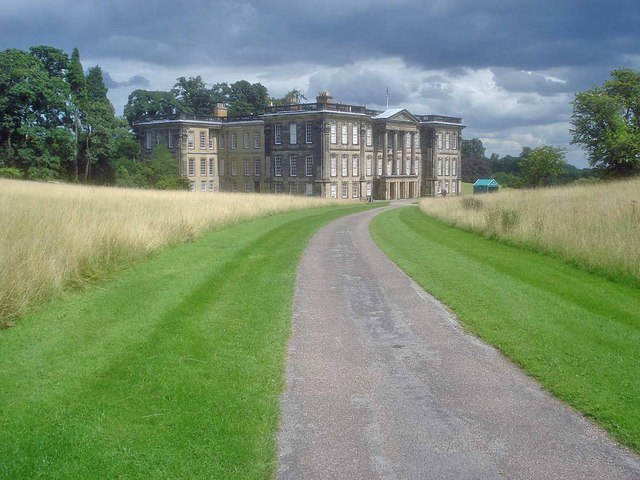
Calke Abbey from the south-west

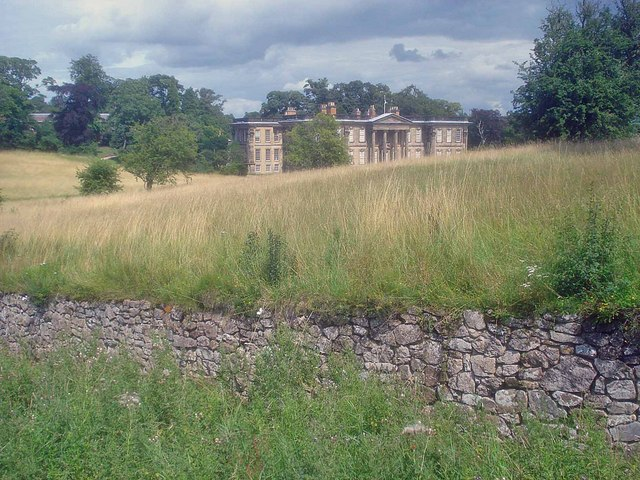
The ha-ha

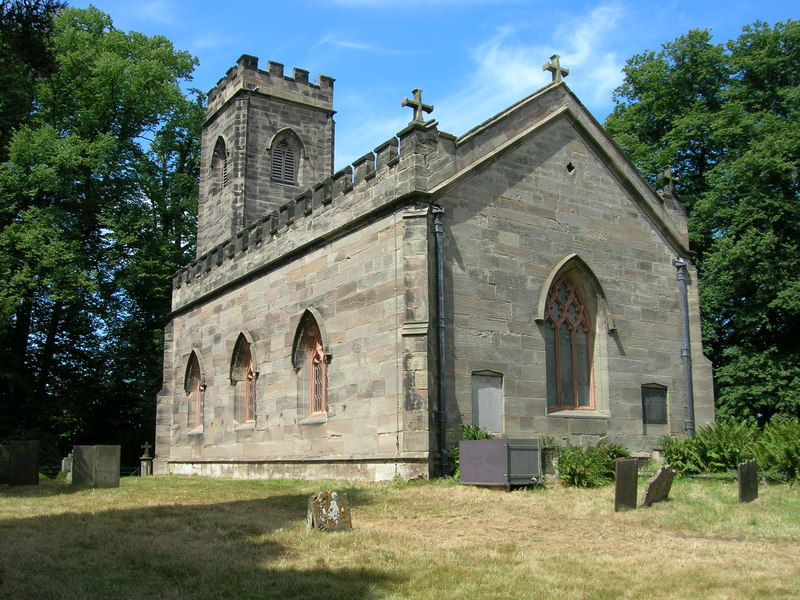
Church of St. Giles, the abbey's private chapel

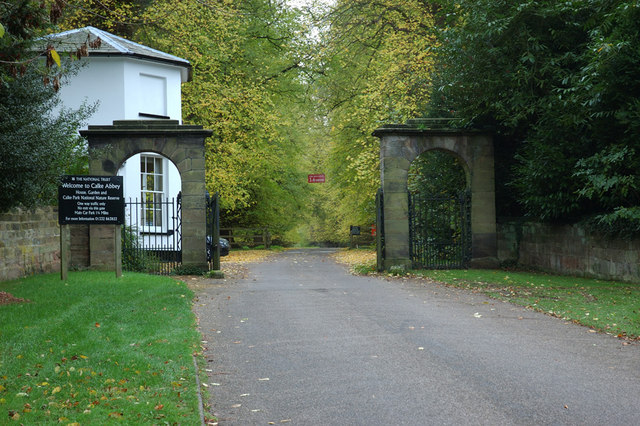
Ticknall Lodge

The saloon

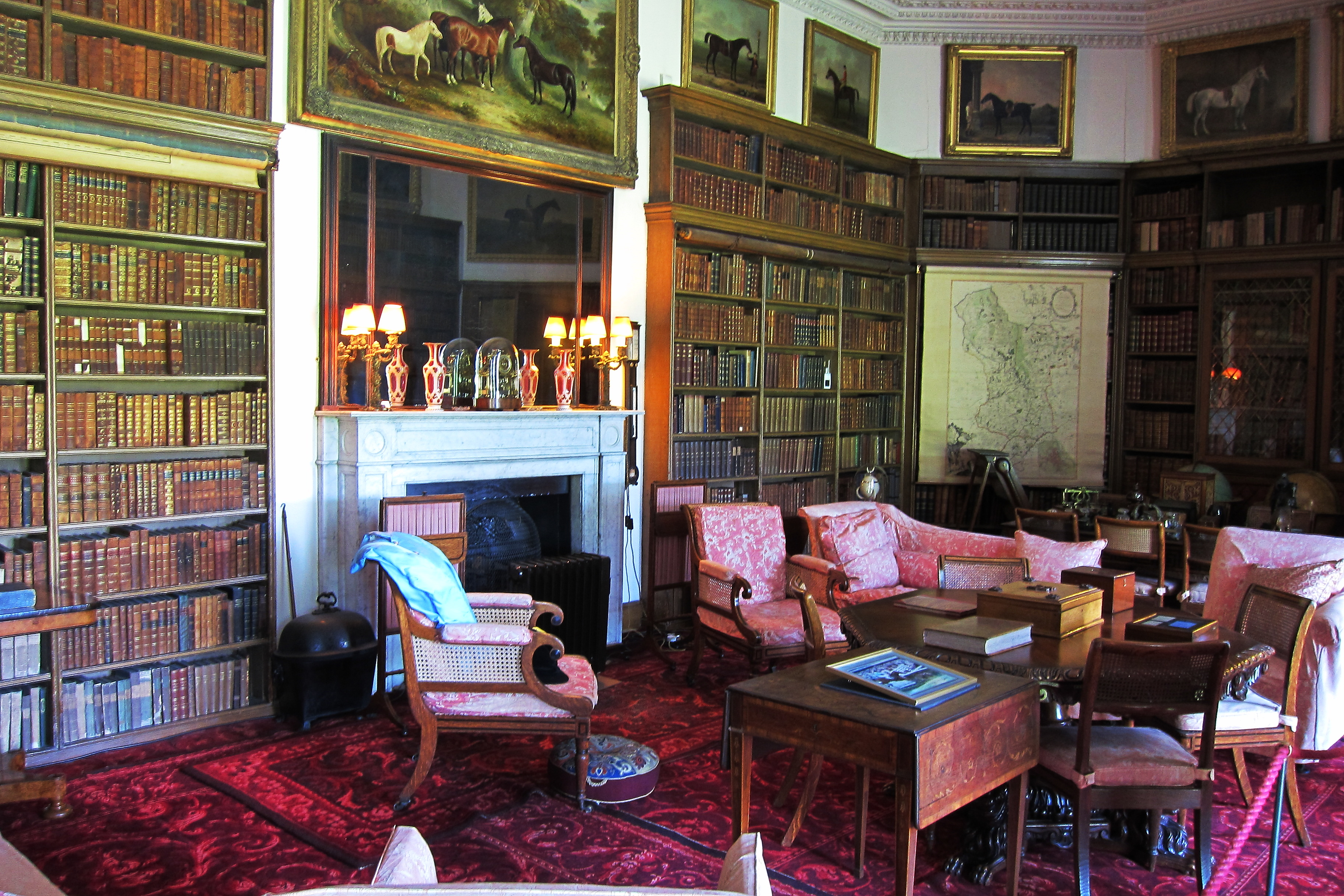
The library

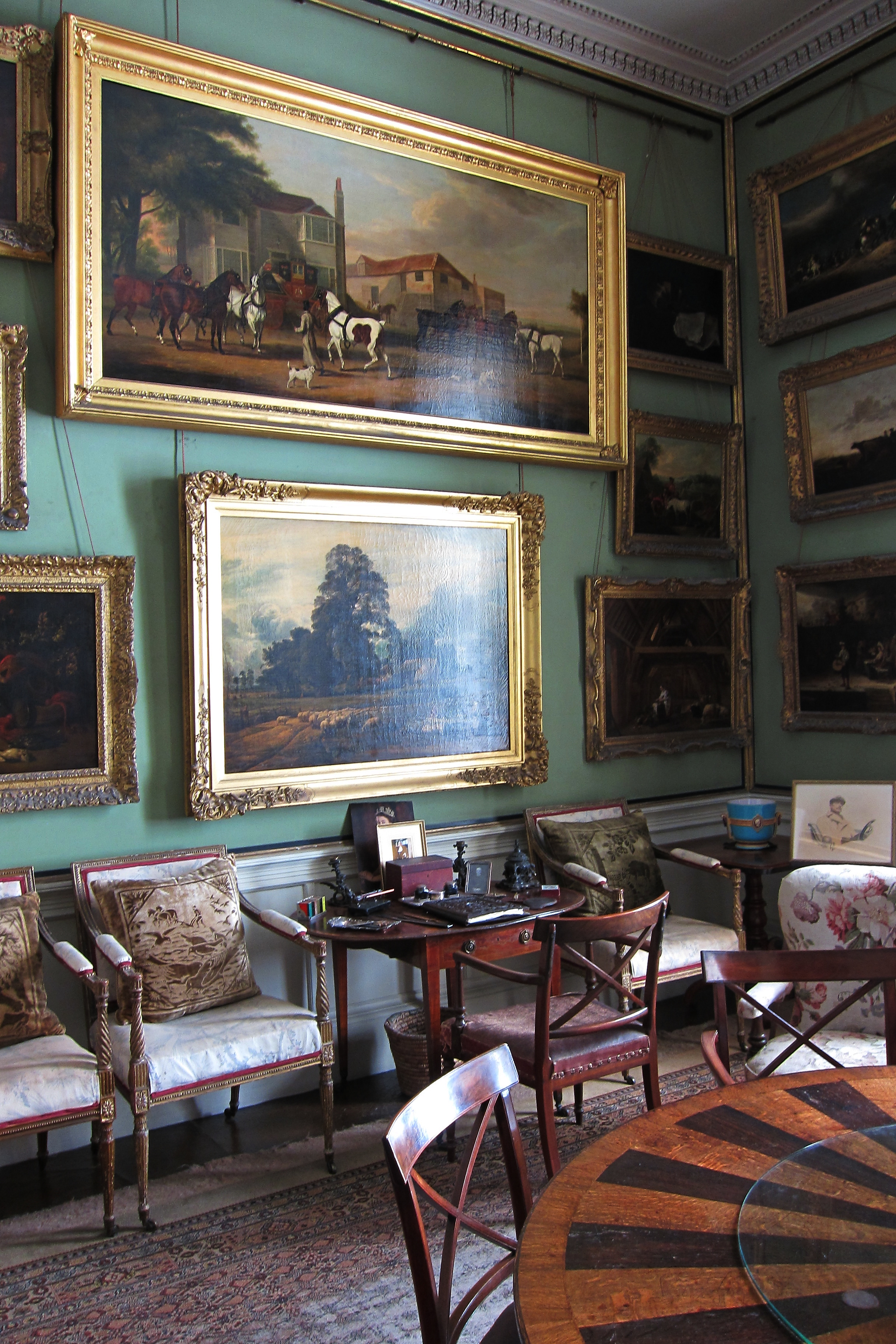
The breakfast room

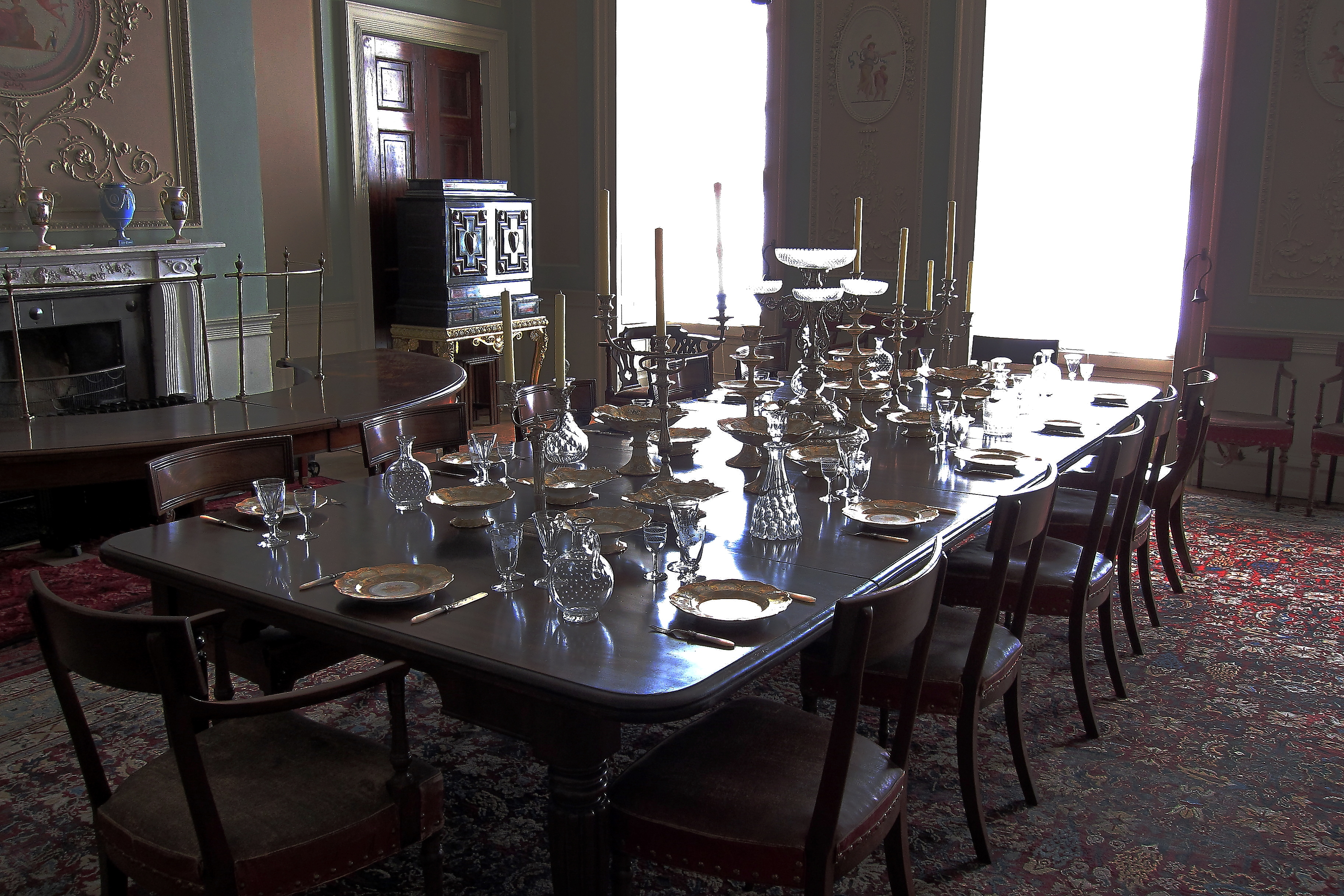
The dining room

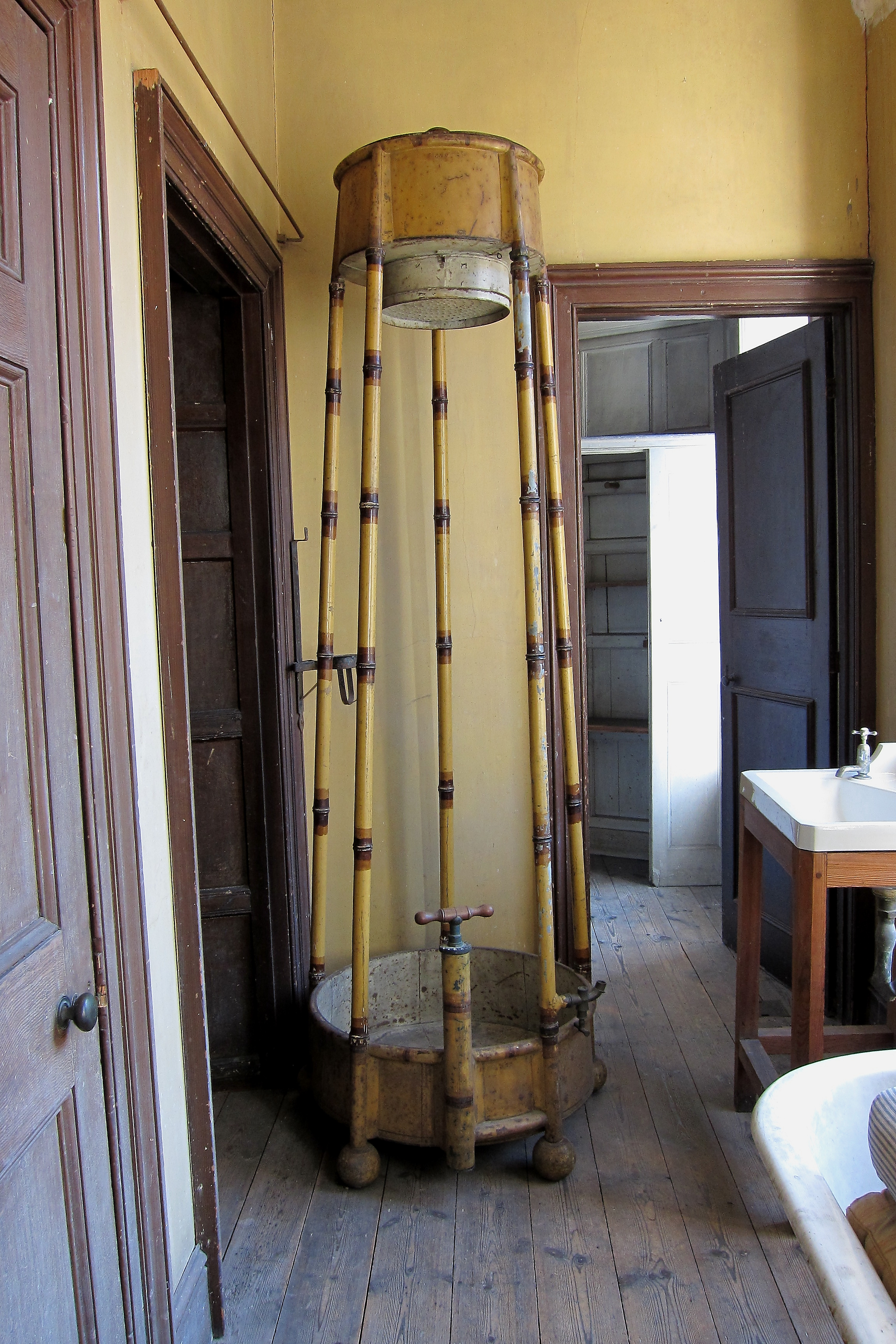
Portable shower

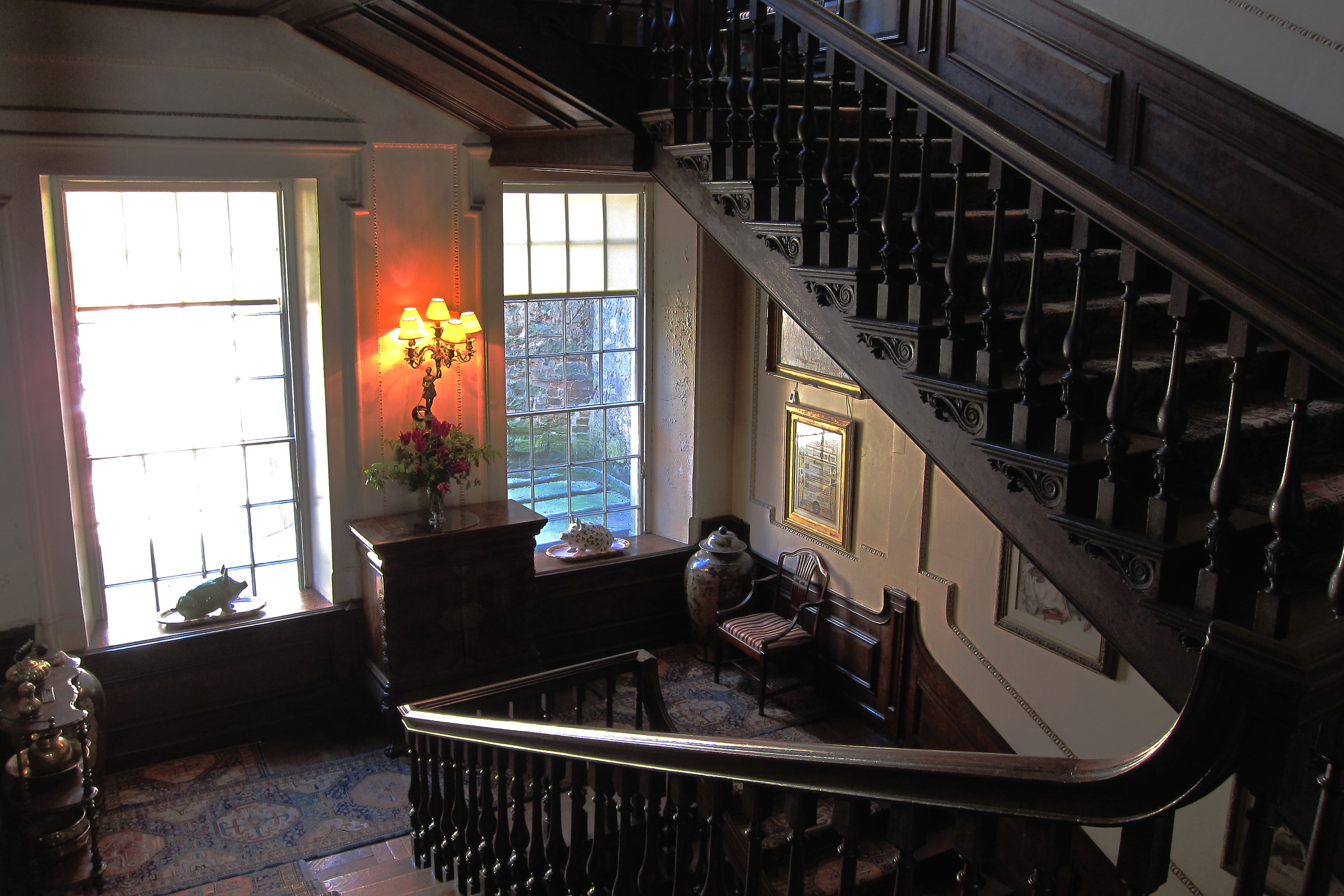
Main staircase

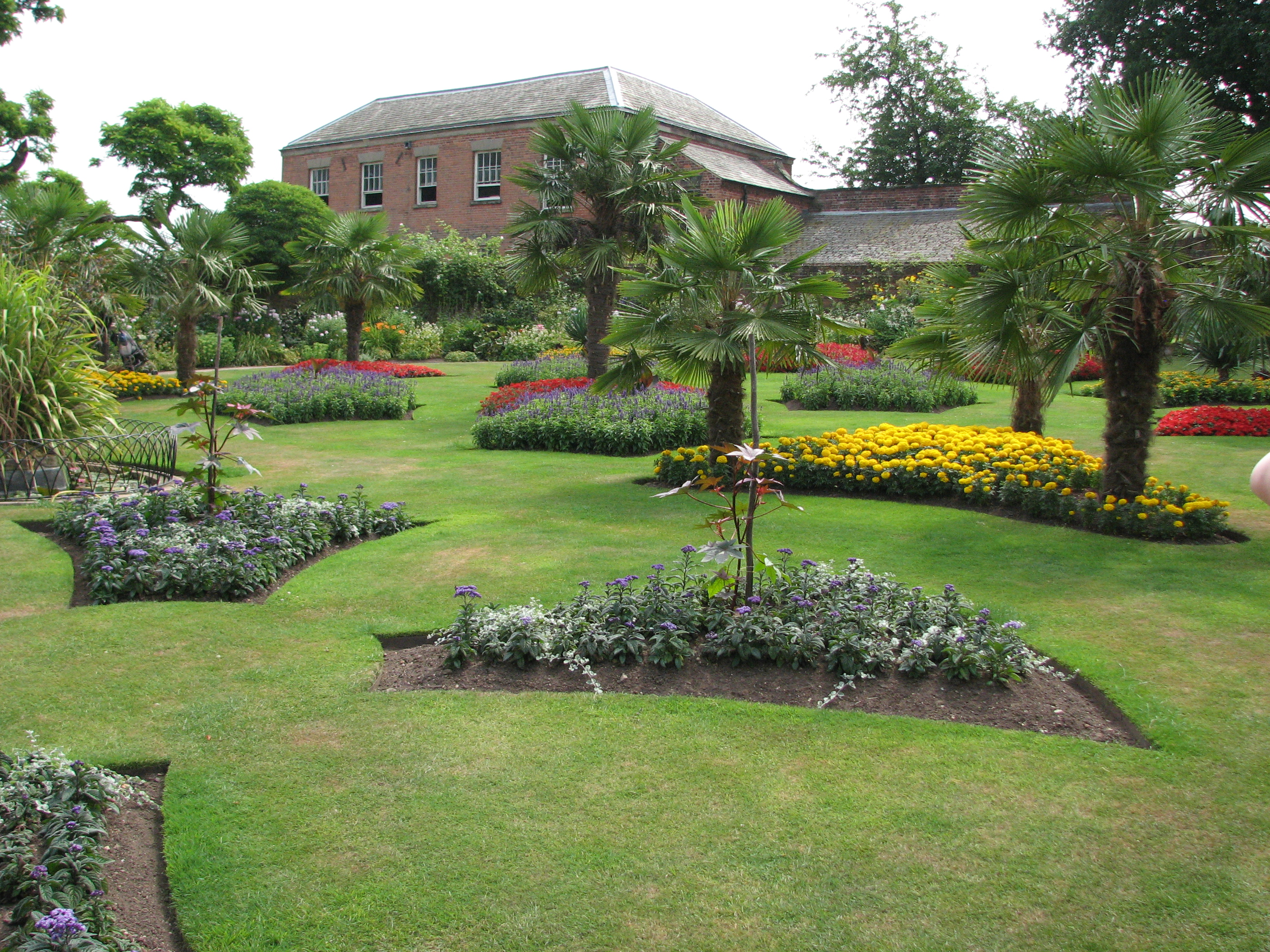
The walled garden and head gardener's house

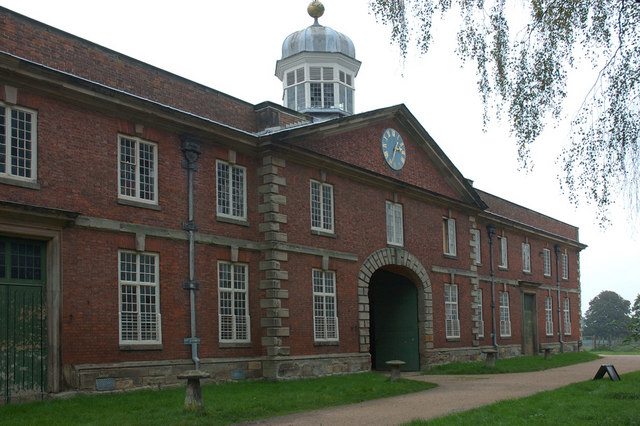
The stables

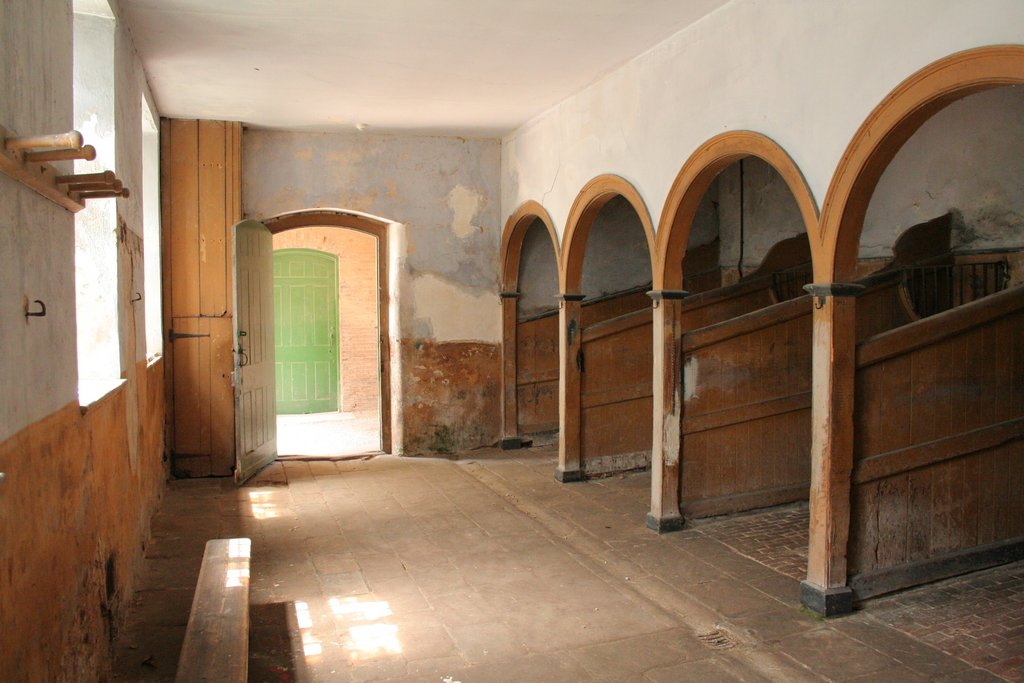
The stables interior

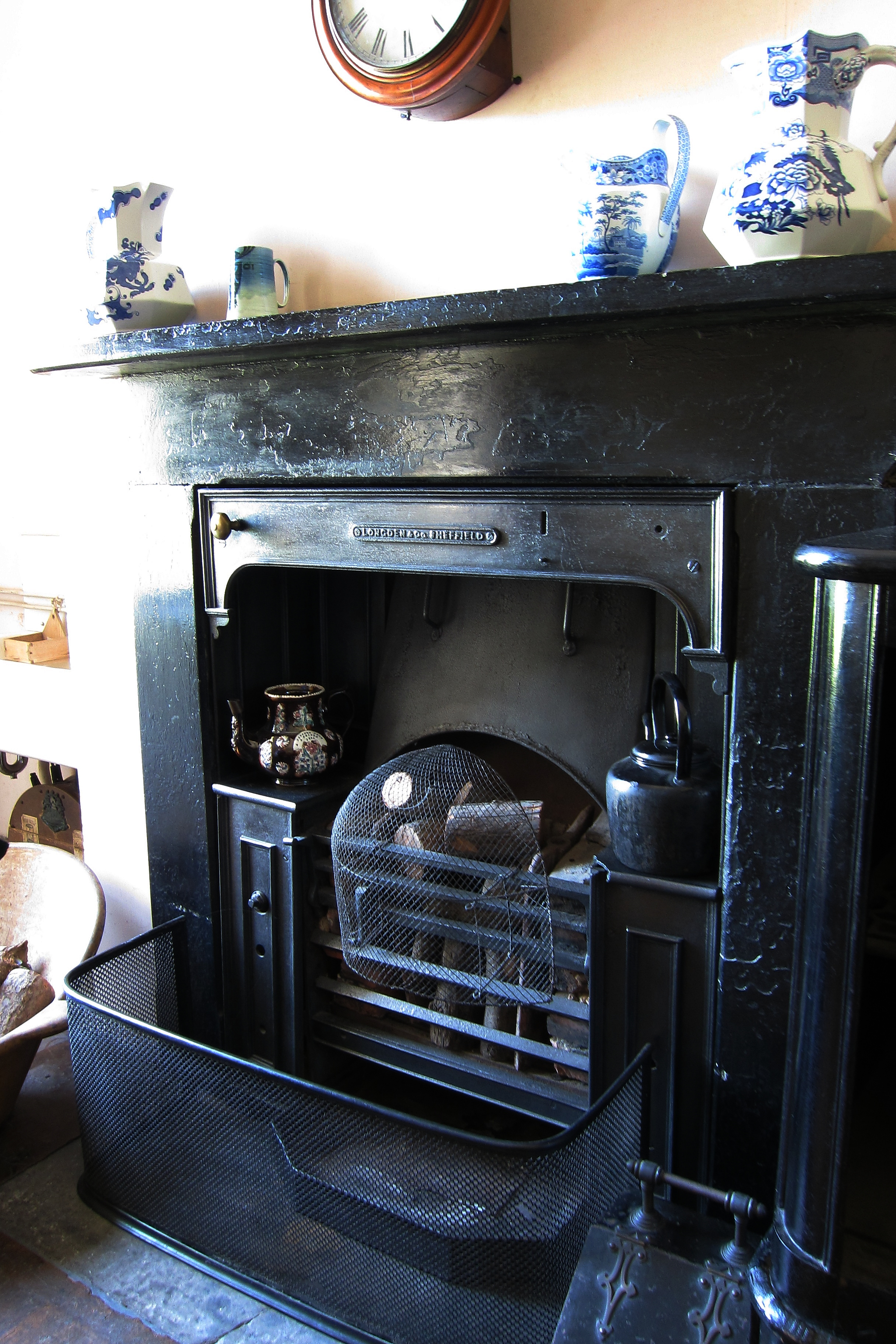
Fireplace in the butlers pantry

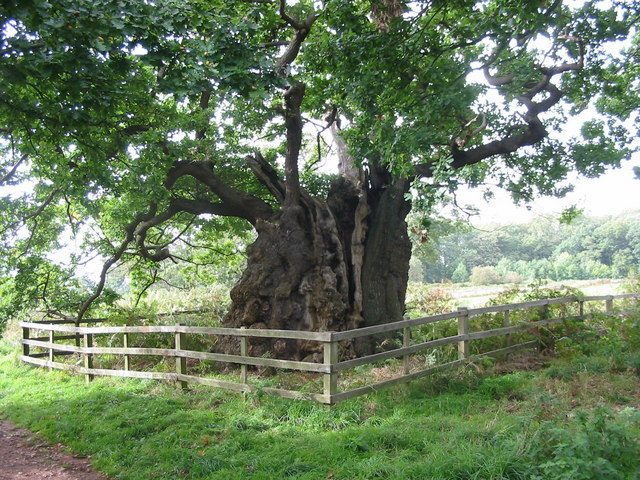
The Old Man of Calke (Quercus robur)

== Sources ==
- Barber, Andrew (2016). Calke Abbey, Derbyshire : a Souvenir Guide. Rotherham. ISBN 978-1-84359-551-9. OCLC 956969447.
- Garnett, Oliver (2002). Calke Abbey, Derbyshire. London: National Trust. ISBN 9781843590361.
- Page, William (1907). The Victoria History of the Counties of England. A History of the County of Derby. London. pp. 58–63.
