= Dove Valley and Biggin Dale =

Protected area in Derbyshire and Staffordshire, England

Coordinates: 53°05′30″N 1°47′25″W

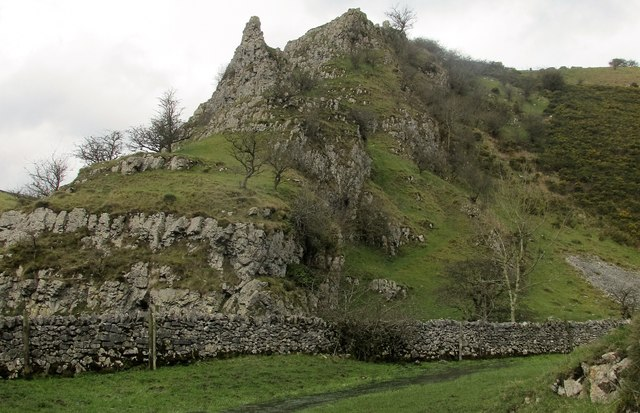
Biggin Dale

Dove Valley and Biggin Dale is a Site of Special Scientific Interest (SSSI) within Peak District National Park, and contains land in both Derbyshire and Staffordshire, England. It is located 4km north of the town of Ashbourne and encompasses the valley of the River Dove (known as Dovedale), where it flows through the parish of Eaton and Alsop, past Milldale, towards the village of Thorpe. This valley has exceptional plant and insect diversity including species that live on limestone outcrops or on scree landforms.

Part of this Site of Special Scientific Interest is also designated as a National Nature Reserve called Dovedale. This protected area includes the hills Baley Hill, Bunster Hill, Iron Tors, Ravens Tor and Thorpe Cloud and the valley called Hall Dale. This protected area also includes caves, including Reynard's Cave and Dove Holes.

== Biology ==
Woodland in this protected area is dominated by the trees ash and wych elm. Tree species also include rowan, field maple and small-leaved lime. Pedunclate oak is present in a few places within this protected area. Where the woodland covers rock outcrops, yew trees and rock whitebeam have been recorded. Hazel is an important shrub here. Herbs within the woodland include dog's mercury and shrubs include mountain currant and mezereon. Fern species in the woodland include hart's-tongue.

Grasslands in the valley bottoms are on deep soil and have wet areas where herbaceous plants include meadowsweet, marsh thistle and cuckooflower (cuckooflower here supports large populations of orange-tip butterflies, as it is a food plant for them). Grasslands on the valley slopes contain the herbaceous plants limestone bedstraw, pale St John's-wort and jacob's ladder. The herb hutchinsia has been recorded on rock outcrops and in scree landforms, plants include narrow-leaved bitter-cress and red hemp-nettle. Fern species on rock outcrops include rusty-back and green spleenwort.

This protected area has a high diversity of lichen species. Lichen species on rocks include Clathroporina calcarea, Solorina spongiosa and Verrucaria murina (see genus Verrucaria).

This protected area is also important for some insect species known as micro-moths (Psychidae) such as Dahlica inconspicuella. Larger moth species in this protected area include feathered ranunculus, light feathered rustic and Blomer’ s rivulet. Butterfly species include white letter hairstreak and green hairstreak.

Bird species in this protected area include redstart, willow tit, sparrowhawk and lesser whitethroat.

Reynard's cave is a wintertime roost for bats.

== Geology ==
The rock underlying this protected area is Carboniferous limestone of the Dinantian period. Dovedale contains a spectacular limestone gorge.

== Land ownership ==
Most of the land within Dove Valley and Biggin Dale SSSI is owned by the National Trust as this valley is situated within its White Peak Estate (also known as the South Peak Estate). The National Trust refer to this area with the name: Ilam Park, Dovedale and the White Peak (see also Ilam Park that includes parkland outside this protected area).
