= Dovedale Dash =

English annual cross-country running race

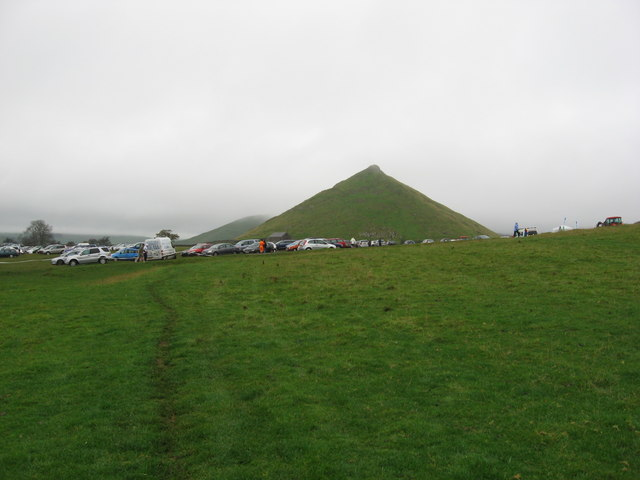
- Thorpe Cloud; the parked cars are in connection with the 2009 Dovedale Dash
- Date: 1953–present
- Location: Thorpe, Derbyshire
- Event type: amateur, cross country
- Distance: 4.75 miles (7.64 km)
- Primary sponsor: The Old Dog (2025)
- Established: 1953
- Course records: men 25.01 Gareth Booty women Louis Austin/holly Rowland 30.09
- Website: http://www.dovedaledash.co.uk/

The Dovedale Dash is a 4.75-mile (7.64 km) cross-country running race held annually along the banks of the River Dove, along Dovedale, and between the villages of Ilam and Thorpe in the Peak District, England. The event attracts over 1000 runners each year. It is one of three long-running annual races held in the Peak District national park where performances count towards the National Trust Peak District Fell Running Series Trophy, alongside the Longshaw Sheepdog Trials Fell Race and the Lantern Pike Fell Race.

First organised in 1953, the Dash takes place on the first Sunday of October, although previously it was held on the closest Sunday to Guy Fawkes Night. The Dash was cancelled in 1998, 2000, 2004, and 2024 when bad weather and a waterlogged parking area forced the event to be cancelled. In other years, the race has gone ahead in wet weather conditions.

The Dash is intended for amateur runners, although in the past some competitors have used bicycles. Entrants pay £15 to join the race, online registration in advance is available for up to 1500 entrants, on the day there are 200 spaces in the race. Car parking is free. The proceeds are given to charitable causes, and used in the villages of Thorpe, Derbyshire, Ilam and Fenny Bentley. The event is organised by volunteers who live in Thorpe village, which is the start and finish of the course.

The route runs from the Thorpe Pastures north of the village of Thorpe, at the foot of Thorpe Cloud, about the eastern base of which competitors race down to the notoriously slippery Stepping Stones across the River Dove. The route continues along the western side of the Cloud, across the ridge above the Izaak Walton Hotel, down into Ilam, where the course doubles back along the southern bank of the Dove, down to Coldwall Bridge. Across the Bridge, runners follow the valley through Thorpe Mill Farm, back to the Cloud, where they retrace their path to the Stepping Stones and back to the starting position on Thorpe Pastures.

== Competitors ==
The Dash has no overall official results. The first ten finishers and all the prize winners are published at the start-finish and on the organisers' website. Local newspapers such as the Ashbourne News Telegraph usually print a report and details of the winners and local entrants. All the finishers receive certificates with their positions except on rare occasions when more people run than was expected. Race time is displayed on a large digital clock mounted on top of the loudspeaker van near the finish so that people who do not have a wrist watch can record their finishing time.

Despite the casual nature of the event, previous runners have included prestigious world-class athletes, including George Rhodes, who frequently ran for England and won the Dash three consecutive times. Eric Thompson, Derby Mercury RC President, donated the original cup to Rhodes, who in turn presented his own George Rhodes Trophy to be awarded to future winners.
