= Listed buildings in Brailsford =

Brailsford is a civil parish in the Derbyshire Dales district of Derbyshire, England. The parish contains 35 listed buildings that are recorded in the National Heritage List for England. Of these, one is listed at Grade I, the highest of the three grades, and the others are at Grade II, the lowest grade. The parish contains the village of Brailsford and the hamlet of Ednaston, and the surrounding countryside. Most of the listed buildings are houses, cottages and associated structures, farmhouses and farm buildings. The other listed buildings include a church, a churchyard cross, a watermill, two boundary posts, two mileposts, a bridge, a school, and a well.

== Key ==
Grade	Criteria
I	Buildings of exceptional interest, sometimes considered to be internationally important
II	Buildings of national importance and special interest

== Buildings ==
Name and location	Photograph	Date	Notes	Grade
Churchyard Cross; 52.96822°N 1.63673°W	—	10th century or earlier	The cross in the churchyard of All Saints' Church consists of a sandstone shaft set on a modern base. The original base is set on a slab to the side of the cross and has a square plan. On the modern base is an inscription recording the discovery of the cross in 1919 and its erection on the new base. The shaft tapers, it is circular at the base, and rises to a square. It is carved with a depiction of a figure, and with interlace and Greek key decoration.	II
All Saints' Church; 52.96833°N 1.63683°W		12th century	The church has been altered and extended through the centuries, and was restored in 1862–63 when the vestry was also added. The church is built in sandstone with a roof of lead and Welsh slate. It consists of a nave with a clerestory, a south aisle, a south porch, a chancel with a north vestry, and a west tower. The tower has two unequal stages, diagonal buttresses, a string course, and a west door with a moulded surround, over which is a three-light window. The bell openings have two lights with Y-tracery, and at the top are gargoyles and an embattled parapet. The porch is gabled and has a chamfered round arch over which is a datestone and a sundial, and there is another sundial in the clerestory.	I
Old Rectory; 52.96846°N 1.62507°W	—	Early 16th century or earlier	The former rectory, which has been extended and much rebuilt, has a timber framed core and a tile roof. There are two storeys, and a rectangular plan with two cross-wings. The south wing is in brick. The north wing is in sandstone, with an east front of six bays on a chamfered plinth. It has a moulded string course, and contains cross windows in the ground floor and casements above. The doorway has an inscribed lintel.	II
The Bakery; 52.96930°N 1.62107°W	—	17th century	The house, which was refronted in the 18th century, is in red brick with sandstone dressings, on a chamfered plinth, with quoins, a floor band, a dentilled eaves cornice, and a tile roof. There are two storeys and three bays. In the centre is a doorway with a moulded surround and a lintel carved with foliage. This is flanked by canted oriel windows, and in the upper floor are casement windows.	II
Brailsford Mill Farmhouse and outbuildings 52.97514°N 1.63896°W	—	Late 17th century	The farmhouse was extended in the mid 19th century by the addition of a storey. The ground floor is in sandstone, the upper floor is in red brick, there is a dentilled eaves band, and the roof is tiled. There are two storeys and a front of four bays, the middle two bays projecting. In the centre is a porch, and the windows include a broad segmental-arched window to the left of the porch. Attached on the right are brick outbuildings.	II
Stable block, Culland Hall; 52.94973°N 1.63793°W	—	Late 17th century	The stable block, which was extended in the 19th century, is in red brick with dentilled eaves, and a tile roof with coped gables, kneelers, and ball finials on the east. There are two storeys and a double depth plan. In the earlier part are quoins and a moulded floor bands, a stable door and a circular window. The later part contains a stable door flanked by segmental-arched carriage entrances. In the twin gable end are two circular windows, and there is an octagonal wooden dovecote.	II
Hall Farmhouse; 52.96946°N 1.62490°W	—	Late 17th century	The farmhouse, which was extended in the early 18th century, has three storeys, a T-shaped plan, a tile roof, and casement windows. The south wing is in sandstone, and has two bays, and a coped gable with plain kneelers. The shorter north wing, at right angles, is in red brick on a chamfered stone plinth, and has coped gables with moulded kneelers and ball finials. In the angle is a gabled porch.	II
Brailsford Mill; 52.97531°N 1.63914°W		1693	The watermill is in red brick and sandstone, with bands and a tile roof. There are two storeys and a basement, the basement rusticated, and a T-shaped plan. The openings include doorways and windows, a blind semicircular arch containing a doorway with a lintel, and in the gable is a circular window.	II
Burrows Hall Farmhouse and garden wall 52.95348°N 1.61054°W		Early 18th century	The farmhouse is in sandstone and red brick, with a plinth at the rear, quoins, a dentilled eaves band, and a tile roof. There are two storeys and a basement at the rear, and an L-shaped plan, with a west front of two bays, and a projecting gabled wing on the left. In the west front is a central doorway with a hood, over which is a dated plaque, and the windows are casements with segmental heads. In the wing is a blocked doorway with a chamfered quoined surround, and mullioned windows. At the rear is a staircase window, and the garden wall has rounded stone copings.	II
Green Farmhouse; 52.97019°N 1.62427°W	—	Early 18th century	The farmhouse is in red brick with stone dressings, chamfered quoins, a moulded eaves band, and a tile roof. There are two storeys and an east front of two bays. In the centre is a gabled porch with a round-arched entrance, and the windows are horizontally-sliding sashes. The windows on the front have flat heads and keystones, and on the south front they have segmental heads.	II
North Farmhouse; 52.98613°N 1.62805°W	—	Mid 18th century	The farmhouse is in red brick with a sawtooth eaves cornice and a tile roof. There are two storeys and a front of three bays. On the front are two doorways with cambered heads, one blocked. The windows are casements, those in the ground floor with cambered heads.	II
Church Stable; 52.96809°N 1.63618°W	—	1754	The former stable to the southeast of the church is in red brick with a sawtooth eaves band, and a tile roof with coped gables and kneelers. It contains an entrance with a wooden lintel, over which is an inscribed stone plaque.	II
Churchfields Farmhouse; 52.96159°N 1.63588°W	—	Late 18th century	The farmhouse is in red brick with a dentilled eaves band and a tile roof. There are two storeys and attics, a front of three bays, a lower rear wing on the right and a rear outshut. The central bay is gabled, it contains a doorway has a fanlight and a bracketed hood, and the windows on the front are sashes with segmental heads. At the rear is a semicircular bay window and horizontally-sliding sash windows.	II
Barn and stable range, Churchfields Farm; 52.96194°N 1.63612°W	—	Late 18th century	The barn and stables form two ranges at right angles, and are in red brick with tile roofs. The north range consists of a barn with a cart shed on the left and contains a doorway, a blocked cart entry, and three tiers of quatrefoil vents. The stables in the west range have two storeys, and contain stable doors, doorways with segmental heads, a window, and external steps. To the south is a single-storey extension with four segmental-headed doorways.	II
Ednaston House, outbuildings, walls and railings 52.96931°N 1.64569°W	—	Late 18th century	The house is in red brick with a dentilled eaves band and a tile roof. There are two storeys and attics, a T-shaped plan, and a front of three bays. The central doorway has a rectangular fanlight and a hood on brackets. The windows are sashes with wedge lintels and double keystones. The front garden is enclosed by a brick wall with stone copings and iron railings. At the rear are various outbuildings and stables, containing segmental-headed doorways and a round-arched doorway.	II
Range of outbuildings, Ednaston House; 52.96904°N 1.64557°W		Late 18th century	The farm buildings, later used for other purposes, are in red brick with a dentilled eaves band and a tile roof, hipped at one end. They are mainly in a single storey, and form an L-shaped plan. At the west is a barn with three segmental-headed doorways, and inside are three re-used upper cruck trusses. To the right is a cowhouse, which, together with the range at right angles, contains windows and segmental-headed doorways. At the end are three goose pens with quatrefoil vents.	II
Oaklands; 52.96764°N 1.61731°W	—	Late 18th century	A red brick house with stone dressings, a sill band, a moulded cornice and parapet, and a hipped tile roof. There are two storeys, three bays, and a recessed bay on the right. The central doorway has a moulded surround, a fanlight and an open pediment. The windows are sashes with edge lintels and double keystones.	II
Coach house, Oaklands; 52.96784°N 1.61691°W	—	Late 18th century	The former coach house is in red brick with a dentilled eaves band and a tile roof. The middle section is gabled, with two storeys and three bays. There is a central doorway in the ground and upper floor, and the outer bays contain windows, all with segmental heads, and in the gable is a lunette. The flanking wings have a single storey, the left wing contains a segmental-arched carriage entrance, and in the right bay the openings have been altered.	II
Pools Head Farmhouse; 52.96141°N 1.62700°W		Late 18th century	The farmhouse is in red brick, with dentilled eaves, and a tile roof with brick coped gables and plain kneelers. There are three storeys, a south front with three bays, and a lower two-storey recessed wing on the right. In the centre of the front is a gabled porch and a doorway with a fanlight. The windows are sashes, those in the lower two floors with segmental-arched heads.	II
Boundary post at OS 225 428; 52.98258°N 1.66776°W	—	Early 19th century	The boundary post on the southeast side of Painter's Lane (A52 road) is in cast iron. It has a triangular plan, a sloping upper part, and a back plate with a curved top. The post is inscribed with the names of the county and the parishes, and details of the manufacturer.	II
Boundary post at OS 243 418; 52.97375°N 1.63901°W	—	Early 19th century	The boundary post on the south side of Painter's Lane (A52 road) is in cast iron. It has a triangular plan, a sloping upper part, and a back plate with a curved top. The post is inscribed with the names of the county and the parishes, and details of the manufacturer.	II
Brailsford Bridge; 52.97374°N 1.64019°W		Early 19th century	The bridge carries Painter's Lane (A52 road) over Brailsford Brook. It is in gritstone and consists of three round arches. The bridge has voussoirs, triangular cutwaters rising to clasping buttresses, a band below the parapet, and a parapet with rounded copings.	II
Brailsford House; 52.96841°N 1.61912°W	—	Early 19th century	The remodelling of an earlier house, it is in painted brick with a sawtooth eaves band and a hipped tile roof. There are two storeys and a south front of three bays, the middle bay slightly recessed. In the centre is a doorway with a fanlight, and the windows are sashes with wedge lintels and keystones.	II
Coach house, Brailsford House; 52.96843°N 1.61885°W	—	Early 19th century	The coach house is in painted brick with a tile roof, two storeys and a single bay. On the south front is a round-headed small-pane window in each floor.	II
Cowhouse, Churchfields Farm; 52.96185°N 1.63564°W	—	Early 19th century	The cowhouse is in red brick with a tile roof, and has a single storey. It contains doorways with basket-arched heads and stepped surrounds, and square windows.	II
Culland Manor Farmhouse; 52.94992°N 1.63371°W		Early 19th century	A red brick farmhouse with overhanging eaves and a hipped tile roof. There are two storeys, a south front of three bays, and a lower north wing. In the centre is a doorway with a fanlight, and the windows are sashes; all the openings have wedge lintels. In the wing is a blocked basket-arched carriage entrance with inserted windows.	II
Ednaston Home Farmhouse; 52.97910°N 1.65952°W	—	Early 19th century	The farmhouse is in red brick with stone dressings, a sill band, a dentilled eaves band, and a tile roof. There are two storeys, a T-shaped plan, and a symmetrical front of five bays. In the centre is a gabled wooden porch, and the windows are sashes with wedge lintels and double keystones.	II
Garage Cottages and Shop; 52.96752°N 1.61764°W		Early 19th century	A row of cottages and a shop in red brick, with a dentilled eaves band, and a tile roof, gabled at the right end and half-hipped on the left. There are two storeys, six bays, and a lean-to on the right. The doorways have segmental heads, and the windows, which are casements, have segmental heads in the ground floor and flat heads in the upper floor.	II
Milepost, Ednaston; 52.97387°N 1.64508°W	—	Early 19th century	The milepost is on the south side of Painter's Lane (A52 road). It is in cast iron with a triangular plan, a sloping upper part, and a curved top. It is inscribed with "EDNASTON TOWNSHIP", the distances to London, Buxton, Ashbourne, and Derby, and the details of the manufacturer.	II
Milepost northwest of Ednaston; 52.98141°N 1.66527°W	—	Early 19th century	The milepost is on the southwest side of Painter's Lane (A52 road). It is in cast iron with a triangular plan, a sloping upper part, and a curved top. It is inscribed with "SHIRLEY PARISH", the distances to London, Buxton, Ashbourne, and Derby, and the details of the manufacturer.	II
School; 52.96910°N 1.62142°W	—	Early 19th century	The school is in painted brick with a dentilled eaves band and a tile roof. There are two storeys and five bays. In front of the right bay is a gabled staircase tower with a round-headed stair window, and, in the return, a round-arched doorway. The other bays contain segmental-headed casement windows and a projecting gabled porch. Above the middle bay is a gabled pediment containing a clock face, and on the roof is a bell turret with a pyramidal roof.	II
Town's well 52.96934°N 1.62086°W	—	Early 19th century (probable)	The well is in sandstone, and set partly into the ground. It has a semicircular arch with voussoirs, and the tap is in the form of a segmental pediment.	II
Barn south of Green Farmhouse; 52.97009°N 1.62472°W	—	Mid 19th century	The farm buildings are in red brick with sandstone dressings and a tile roof. They form an L-shaped plan, with a main two-storey range running north–south containing a barn and stables, and a single-storey cowhouse to the southeast. The main range contains a broad segmental archway, doors with flat stone lintels, and windows with segmental-arched lintels.	II
School House; 52.96926°N 1.62146°W	—	1870s	A red brick house with a tile roof and two storeys. There are two bays, the left bay gabled, and the right bay recessed. The doorway has a Tudor arch, the windows are casements, and there is a gabled dormer.	II
Ednaston Manor, walls and terracing 52.97732°N 1.64638°W	—	1912–13	A small country house designed by Edwin Lutyens in Queen Anne style. It is in reddish-brown brick with sandstone dressings, on a plinth, with bands, and hipped tile roofs. There are two storeys and attics, an H-shaped plan, single-storey angle pavilions, and a single-storey service wing. The west, entrance, front has five bays divided by pilasters with monogrammed capitals. In the centre is a doorway with an architrave, over which is a swan-neck pediment and a cartouche. The garden front to the south has projecting wings, and a doorway with Doric pilasters and an open pediment containing a roundel. All the windows are small-pane casements, and there are dormers. In the garden is a three-tier terrace with brick retaining walls and stone steps.	I
