= Listed buildings in Thorpe, Derbyshire =

Thorpe is a civil parish in the Derbyshire Dales district of Derbyshire, England. The parish contains eleven listed buildings that are recorded in the National Heritage List for England. Of these, one is listed at Grade I, the highest of the three grades, and the others are at Grade II, the lowest grade. The parish contains the village of Thorpe and the surrounding countryside. The listed buildings consist of houses, a church and a sundial in the churchyard, a milestone, and three bridges.

== Key ==
Grade	Criteria
I	Buildings of exceptional interest, sometimes considered to be internationally important
II	Buildings of national importance and special interest

== Buildings ==
Name and location	Photograph	Date	Notes	Grade
St Leonard's Church; 53.04856°N 1.76834°W		Early 12th century	The church has been altered and extended through the centuries, and the chancel was restored in 1881–84. The church is built in limestone with sandstone dressings and tile roofs. It consists of a nave with a south porch, a chancel with a north vestry, and a west tower. The tower is Norman, and has three stages, large quoins, a round-headed west doorway, partly blocked and a window inserted, lancet windows, a clock face on the west side, and two-light bell openings with a hood mould, over which is a corbel table and embattled parapets.	I
Coldwall Bridge; 53.04487°N 1.77908°W		Mid-18th century	The bridge, which carries a former turnpike road, now a track, over the River Dove, was later widened and heightened. It is in limestone, and consist of a segmental arch and two small semicircular arches with a flight of steps. The bridge is heavily buttressed, and has coped parapet walls.	II
Green Lea, Green Croft and Green Gables; 53.05019°N 1.76867°W		Mid-18th century	A farmhouse, later divided into three houses, the building is in limestone with sandstone dressings and a tile roof. There are two storeys, a three-storey cross-wing at the south, and six bays. On the front is a gabled porch, a blocked doorway with a quoined surround and a lintel, and a later doorway. The windows either have a single light, or are mullioned.	II
The Old House; 53.04886°N 1.76771°W		Mid-18th century	The house is in limestone with sandstone dressings, and a tile roof with a coped gable and plain kneelers. There are two storeys and six bays, the right bay with a single storey. On the front are doorways, one with a flat hood, and the windows either have a single light or are mullioned.	II
Thorpe Cottage; 53.05040°N 1.76705°W		Mid-18th century	A house in limestone with sandstone dressings, a moulded eaves cornice and a tile roof. There are two storeys and an L-shaped plan, with a front range of three bays. In the centre is a doorway with a moulded surround, a frieze and a cornice. The windows are top-hung casements imitating sashes, with moulded surrounds.	II
Sundial; 53.04838°N 1.76842°W		1767	The sundial is in the churchyard of St Leonard's Church in gritstone, and is on the top of a tapering pillar about 5 feet (1.5 m) high. The pillar has a moulded base and cap, and a broad flat plinth.	II
St Marys Bridge (East); 53.05138°N 1.78308°W	—	1790	The bridge carries Thorpe Road, and is in gritstone. It consists of a single segmental arch, and has canted parapet walls with chamfered copings. On the north wall is a dated and inscribed foundation stone.	II
Milestone; 53.04506°N 1.77710°W		1822	The milestone is on the south side of Coldwell Lane. It is a stone with a segmental curved top, and a cast iron panel inscribed with the distance to Cheadle.	II
St Marys Bridge (West); 53.05138°N 1.78375°W	—	Early 19th century	The bridge carries Thorpe Road over the River Dove, and was later widened to the north. It is in gritstone and consists of a single segmental arch with canted parapet walls, chamfered copings, and square end piers.	II
Thorpe House; 53.05099°N 1.77054°W		Early 19th century	The house is in rendered limestone with sandstone dressings, bracketed eaves corbels, and a stone roof. There are two storeys and three bays. The central doorway has a stone surround, a lintel carved with a depressed ogee arch, and a bracketed hood. The windows are sashes.	II
