= Brailsford =

Village in Derbyshire, England

- Brailsford parish highlighted within Derbyshire
- Population: 1,116 (2011)
- OS grid reference: SK254414
- District: Derbyshire Dales
- Shire county: Derbyshire
- Region: East Midlands
- Country: England
- Sovereign state: United Kingdom
- Post town: ASHBOURNE
- Postcode district: DE6
- Police: Derbyshire
- Fire: Derbyshire
- Ambulance: East Midlands

Brailsford (52°58′16″N 1°37′26″W) is a small red-brick village and civil parish in Derbyshire on the A52 midway between Derby and Ashbourne. The parish also includes Brailsford Green. The civil parish population at the 2011 Census was 1,118. The village has a pub, a golf club, a post office and a school.

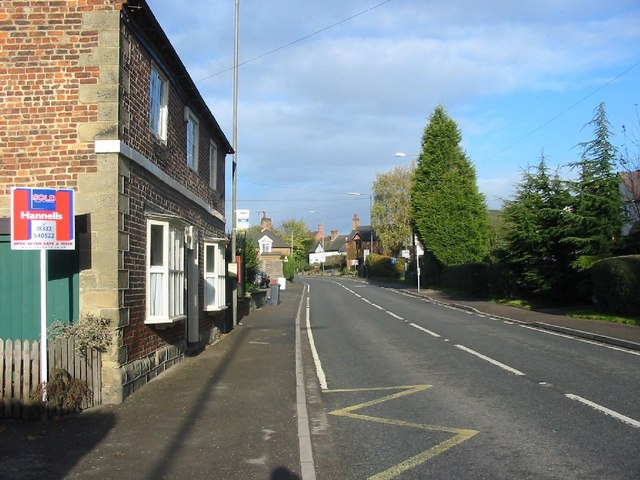
Brailsford village

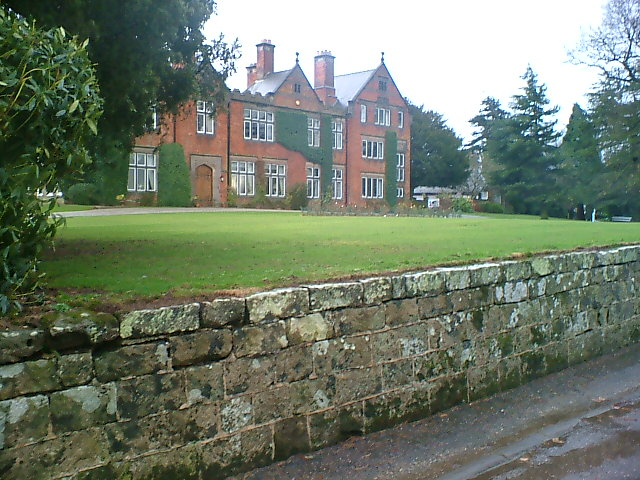
Brailsford Hall

== Toponymy ==
The name Brailsford was recorded in the Domesday Book of 1086 as Breilesfordham, in which the two specific elements are Old English ford and ham ("homestead"). The first part of the name appears to be from a derivative of OE byrgels ("burial mound") but, as with Brailes (Warwickshire), this element may be a Common Brittonic compound name from the elements brigo- ("hill") and lisso ("hall, court").

== History ==
Brailsford was mentioned in the Domesday Book as being in the tenancy of Elfin (possibly an Anglo-Norman rendering of the Saxon Aelfwine) who also held the nearby manors of Bupton, Osmaston and Thurvaston from the tenant-in-chief, Henry de Ferrers

The Domesday survey of 1086 records the following for Brailsford:

Land of Henry de Ferrers M. In Brailsford Earl Waltheof had 2 carucates of land taxable. Land for 2 ploughs. Now in lordship 2 ploughs. 24 villagers and 3 smallholders have 5 ploughs. A priest and ½ church; 1 mill, 10s 8d; meadow 11 acres; Woodland pasture 1 league long and 1 league wide.

Value before 1066, 60s; now 40s. Elfin holds it.

Elfin, through his son Nicholas de Brailsford, is the ancestor of the Brailsford family, who are still numerous in the county and elsewhere today.

From Pigot and Co's Commercial Directory for Derbyshire, 1835:

"BRAILSFORD is rather a considerable village, in the parish of its name, and hundred of Appletree; situate on the main road between Derby and Ashbourne, equidistant from each place. Coaches to different parts of the kingdom are continually passing through here, and the support of the village is chiefly derived from that circumstance—there being no manufactures, nor any extensive trade existing here. The places of worship are the parish church, and a chapel for Wesleyan methodists; the former, which is situate, about half a mile from the village, is dedicated to All Saints, and the living is a rectory, in the patronage of Earl Ferrers"

The parish (which has no dependent township) contained 724 inhabitants in 1821 and 780 in 1831.

There are many fine houses in the district. Brailsford Hall was rebuilt for George Herbert Strutt in 1901 in a restrained Jacobean style by Hunter and Woodhouse of Belper. Culland Hall was built in 1939 to the designs of George Morley Eaton PRIBA of Derby for Col. Sir Edward Thompson.

== Ednaston ==
The hamlet of Ednaston on the other side of Brailsford Brook has the grade I listed Ednaston Manor, built 1912–14 for W.G. Player by Sir Edwin Lutyens, which is not open to the public. According to Pevsner, Home Farm and Ruck o'Stones Cottage are also apparently by Lutyens. Ednaston Hall and Ednaston House also stand in the village.

== Muggington ==
Also nearby at Muggington is the Halter Devil Chapel, built in 1723 onto the end of a farmhouse by Francis Brown, a reformed alcoholic, who one night attempted to halter his horse, mistakenly caught a cow, and thought it was the devil.

== Places of worship ==
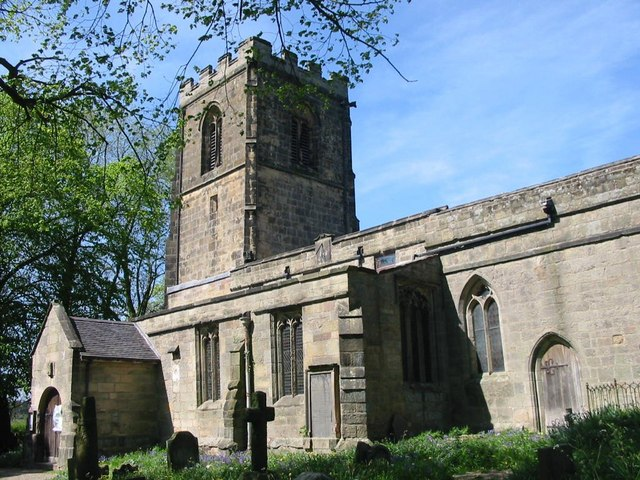
All Saints', Brailsford

Brailsford parish church, or "half a church" as stated in the Domesday Book—referring to its status as a shared church between Brailsford and the hamlet of Ednaston—is about half a mile from the village. It was originally built in the 11th and 12th centuries and consists of a nave, chancel, south aisle and tower. There have been later modifications, such as the 14th century chancel arch. The tower is ashlar-faced and diagonally buttressed with a Perpendicular west door and west window. It contains an octagonal font in the Perpendicular style, with the lower part of the base exhibiting the Tudor rose. In the churchyard is a mid-11th century Saxon cross, showing interlace and a human figure.

Brailsford also has a small Methodist church; originally a Primitive Methodist chapel built in 1845, it was extended in 1914.

== Local traditions ==
Many locals take part in the famous Royal Shrovetide Football match played in Ashbourne on two afternoons during February. An annual ploughing match takes place in Brailsford on the first Wednesday in October.

== See also ==
- Listed buildings in Brailsford
