= Hilton Brook =

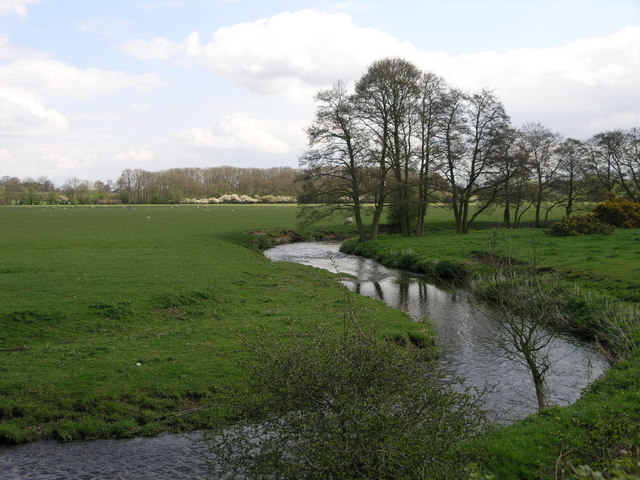
- Sutton Brook near Sutton on the Hill

- Confluence with the River Dove shown in Derbyshire

Location
- Country: England
- Counties: Derbyshire
- District: South Derbyshire
- Villages: Longford, Sutton on the Hill, Hilton

Physical characteristics
- Source
  - location: Hulland, Derbyshire
  - coordinates: 53.0258°N 1.6351°W
- Mouth
  - location: Egginton, Derbyshire
  - coordinates: 52.8435°N 1.6079°W
- Length: 26 km (16 mi)
- Basin size: 103 km^{2} (40 sq mi)

Basin features
- Tributaries
  - right: Bradley Brook, Shirley Brook, Limbersitch Brook
- Progression : Hilton Brook—Dove—Trent—Humber

The Hilton Brook or Sutton Brook is a tributary of the River Dove in Derbyshire, England, and is 26 kilometres (16 miles) long. Like many watercourses in the area, it has multiple names, often being named locally after the village it flows past.

== Course ==
The source of the brook is to the north of Hulland village, where it is known as the Hulland-Hollow brook. It flows south to become the Spinneyford brook; this changes to the Brailsford brook after the confluence with the Bradley brook. It then flows past the village of Ednaston, and takes the name of Longford brook in the middle reaches, after it is joined by the Shirley brook, near Longford. The name changes again, to the Sutton brook as it passes Sutton on the Hill, and finally becomes the Hilton brook as it flows past the village of the same name. The brook then flows in a south-easterly direction to join the River Dove north of Burton upon Trent near the village of Egginton.

== Catchment ==
The brook drains a catchment with a geology consisting of mainly Mercian mudstones and Siltstone, but with some Sandstone and Shales in the upper reaches. Hilton Brook has an area of 103 square kilometres, and has been designated as main river by the Environment Agency from Longford to its confluence with the Dove.

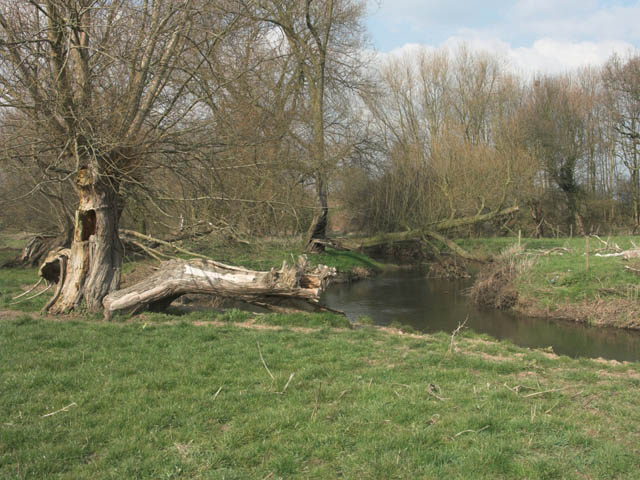
Hilton Brook near Egginton
