= All Saints' Church, Brailsford =

All Saints’ Church, Brailsford
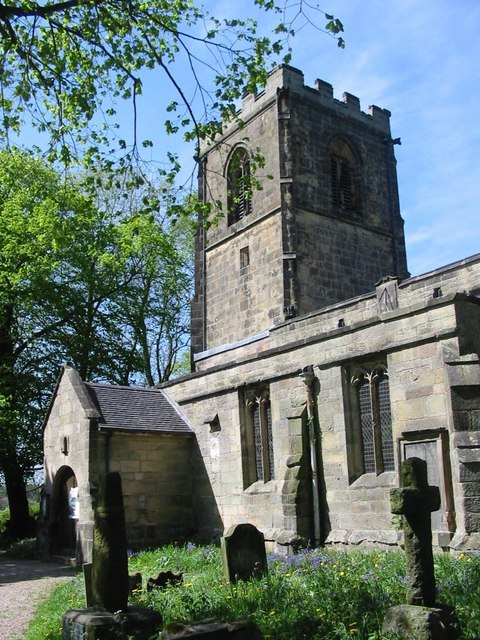
- All Saints’ Church, Brailsford (photograph by Clive Woolliscroft)
- All Saints’ Church, Brailsford
- 52°58′6.62″N 1°38′12.49″W
- Location: Brailsford
- Country: England
- Denomination: Church of England

History
- Dedication: All Saints

Architecture
- Heritage designation: Grade I listed

Administration
- Diocese: Diocese of Derby
- Archdeaconry: Derby
- Deanery: Ashbourne
- Parish: Brailsford

All Saints’ Church, Brailsford is a Grade I listed parish church in the Church of England in Brailsford, Derbyshire.

== History ==
The church dates from the 12th century. It comprises a west tower, nave with south aisle, chancel and north vestry. It was restored between 1882 and 1883 when the galleries were removed. The walls and pillars of the church were scraped of plaster and whitewash. The stonework of the doors and windows was cleaned and restored by Mr. Walker of Ashbourne. The pews were removed and oak benches installed. The floor of the nave was relaid with oak blocks and the chancel was laid with Minton encaustic tiles.

== Parish status ==
The church is in a joint parish with

- St James' Church, Edlaston
- St Martin's Church, Osmaston
- St Michael's Church, Shirley
- Holy Trinity Church, Yeaveley

== Memorials ==
- Edward Cox (d. 1846) by Hall of Derby
- Annie Mosse (d. 1868) by Hall of Derby
- Mary Horsfall (d. 1862) by Hall of Derby
- Thomas Cox (d. 1842) by Hall of Derby
- John Boden (d. 1840) by Hall of Derby
- Anna Palmer (d. 1840) by Hall of Derby
- William Cox (d. 1900) by Lomas of Derby
- Roger Cox (d. 1843) and Francis Cox (d. 1853) by J B Robinson of Derby
- Dorothy Draper (d. 1683)

== Organ ==
The pipe organ was built by Harrison and Harrison and dates from 1914. A specification of the organ can be found on the National Pipe Organ Register.

== Bells ==
The church tower contains a peal of 6 bells, with 3, 4, and 5 dating from 1717 by Abraham I Rudhall. The tenor and 2 are from 1816 by William Dobson and the treble is from 1956 by John Taylor & Co.

== See also ==
- Grade I listed churches in Derbyshire
- Listed buildings in Brailsford
