= Monks Bridge, River Dove =

Monks Bridge
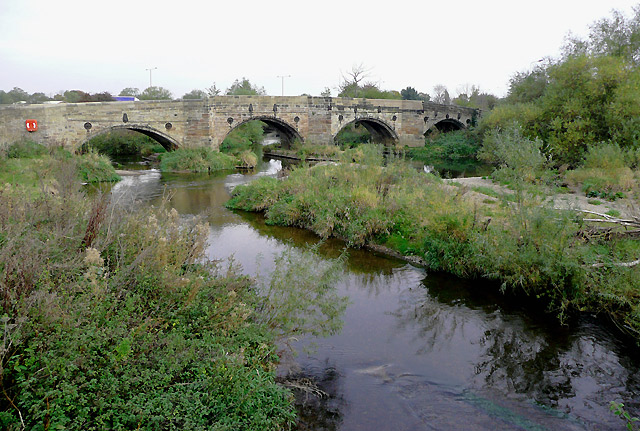
- View of the southern elevation from the nearby Trent and Mersey Canal aqueduct
- Coordinates: 52°50′23″N 01°36′11″W
- Carries: A slip road from the A38
- Crosses: River Dove
- Locale: Stretton, Staffordshire/Egginton, Derbyshire
- Other name: Egginton Bridge

Characteristics
- Traversable?: Yes
- No. of spans: 4
- Piers in water: 3
- Load limit: Vehicular traffic prohibited
- No. of lanes: 2

History
- Opened: Since 13th century
- Rebuilt: Widened in 1775
- Replaced by: A38 road bridge to the north

Location
- Interactive map of Monks Bridge

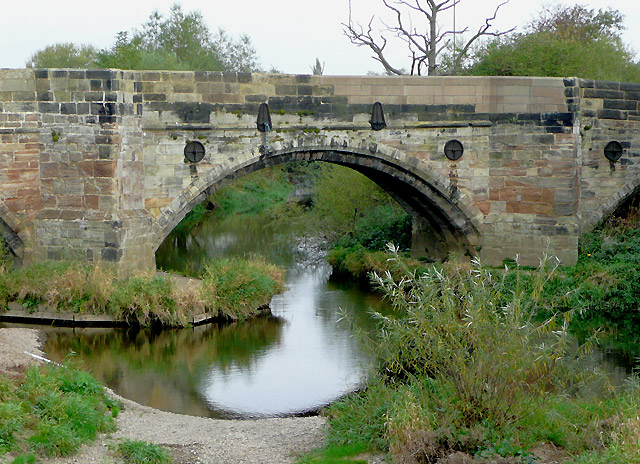
Detail of an arch

Monks Bridge is a road bridge across the River Dove between Stretton, Staffordshire, and Egginton, Derbyshire. A bridge has existed here since the early 13th century, though much of the current structure dates to the 15th century. It formerly carried traffic on what is now the A38 road but a replacement structure was built to the north in 1926. It was formerly used as a slip road but is now out of use to vehicular traffic.

== Description ==
The bridge spans the River Dove and provides a crossing between the parishes of Stretton, Staffordshire and Egginton, Derbyshire. It is a stone bridge with four arches, founded in the river on cutwaters, and with triangular bastions (outwards projections of the deck and parapet) at the piers. Each arch spans approximately 10 metres (33 ft) and the bridge is around 6.1 metres (20 ft) wide. The arches, except for the westernmost, are ribbed. The piers are founded on spread foundations supplemented with timber piles. The arch spandrels are supported by tie rods with anchor plates.

Much of the current fabric of the bridge is 15th-century and it is a scheduled monument (it is separately scheduled in both Derbyshire and Staffordshire). In normal conditions the river does not flow through the eastern-most arch, which has a concrete invert. The parapets are of masonry and in some locations there is a narrow pedestrian verge on the bridge deck.

== Current usage ==
The bridge was formerly used as a slip road with access to and from the southbound carriageway of the A38 road. It was signposted as a weak bridge with a 3-tonne (3.0-long-ton; 3.3-short-ton) maximum gross vehicle weight. As of 2014 the bridge was taken out of vehicular use and associated traffic barriers have been removed. It is in the ownership of National Highways.

== History ==
=== Ecclesiastical ownership ===
A bridge existed at this site by the early 13th century, when it was known as the Egginton Bridge. An earlier structure may have existed at this site to carry the Roman Icknield Street across the river. In 1225 the abbot of Burton Abbey, John of Stretton, considered it was the responsibility of the abbey to maintain the bridge and paid for it to be rebuilt. However, in 1256 an inquest found that liability for the repair of the bridge lay instead with the local residents. The wide span of the current arches suggests that they post-date the 1225 rebuilding.

The structure was known as Monk Bridge by 1394 when permission was granted by The Crown for a chaplain to erect a chapel on the bridge and collect alms for its maintenance. In 1398 a chantry dedicated to Saint Anne was erected, apparently in honour of the recently deceased queen (Anne of Bohemia).

=== Public ownership ===
After the Dissolution of the Monasteries, including abbeys, (1536–41) and abolition of chantries (1545–47) the local community became unambiguously responsible for maintenance. By the middle of the century the burden fell, at least partly, upon Egginton Parish who, in 1548, sold two church bells to finance repairs. By the late 17th century the counties of Staffordshire and Derbyshire had accepted joint liability for maintenance and a 2-metre (6.6 ft) widening of the structure, on the north side, was carried out in 1775.

By the late 19th century, with the rise of motorised transport, Derbyshire County Council became concerned about the risk of a collapse from overloading. On 1 December 1899 John Peake was fined £1 for driving a traction engine over Monk's Bridge, "in spite of a copy of the bye-law—which prohibits the use of the bridge for locomotives—being conspicuously posted on the bridge". In his defence, Peake and his employer, Messrs. Aveling, made the point that a "Pickford's heavy dray would bring three times more weight per inch to bear on the bridge than a 15-ton steam roller", but the court rejected the argument.

=== Modern period ===
In 1924, as part of a project to realign the A38, Derbyshire County Council requested bids for a 40 ft (12 m) wide ferroconcrete replacement road bridge north of the Monks Bridge, on land purchased from Edward Every for £50 an acre. They accepted a tender of £30,862 from the firm of G.F. Tomlinson. Construction of the new bridge was complete by 1926. Permission was granted for repairs to be made to the structure in April 2004.
