= Ednaston Manor =

Country house in Derbyshire, England

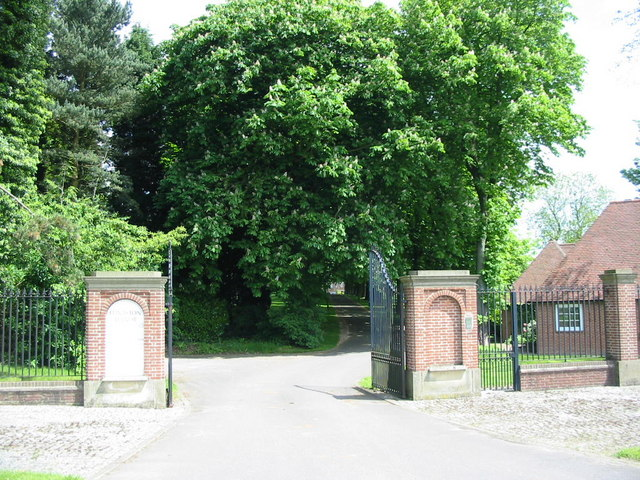
- The entrance gates to Ednaston Manor
- Interactive map of the Ednaston Manor area

General information
- Architectural style: Queen Anne
- Location: Ednaston, England
- Coordinates: 52.9773°N 1.6463°W
- Construction started: 1912
- Completed: 1919
- Client: William G. Player

Design and construction
- Architect: Edwin Lutyens

Listed Building – Grade I
- Official name: Ednaston Manor and attached walls and terracing
- Designated: 13 September 1967
- Reference no.: 1109745

Ednaston Manor is a country house in Ednaston, near Brailsford, Derbyshire, England. It was built in 1912–19 in a Queen Anne style by Edwin Lutyens, for William G. Player. It is a Grade I listed building.

It was bought by free newspaper pioneer and former Derby County chairman Lionel Pickering in 1979. He improved the extensive gardens, which were open to the public during the summer, then sold the house to a local businessman shortly before his death in 2006.
