= Thorpe, Derbyshire =

Village in Derbyshire, England

Coordinates: 53.050°N 1.768°W

Thorpe
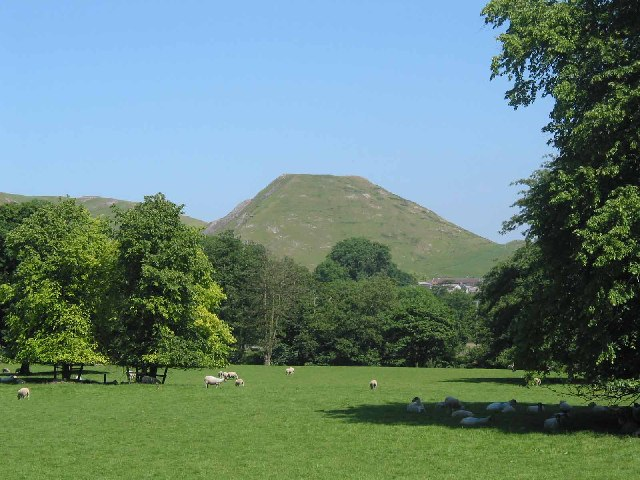
- Thorpe Cloud viewed from near Ilam church.

- Location within Derbyshire
- Population: 183 (2011)
- OS grid reference: SK156503
- District: Derbyshire Dales
- Shire county: Derbyshire
- Region: East Midlands
- Country: England
- Sovereign state: United Kingdom
- Post town: ASHBOURNE
- Postcode district: DE6
- Police: Derbyshire
- Fire: Derbyshire
- Ambulance: East Midlands

Thorpe is a village and civil parish in the English county of Derbyshire; it is on the Derbyshire/Staffordshire border, on the east bank of the River Dove, about four miles north of Ashbourne. The population of the civil parish as at the 2011 census was 183.

Thorpe is at the southern end of the Peak District National Park almost at the foot of Thorpe Cloud, and is used by some visitors as a base for exploring Dovedale and the Manifold Valley. The Limestone Way long-distance bridleway passes through Thorpe, as does the Peak District Boundary Walk.

The Dovedale Dash, a 4¾ mile cross-country running race held annually each November, was first organised here in 1953.

It formerly had a railway station, Thorpe Cloud railway station, served by the LNWR Ashbourne to Buxton branch line, which linked with the Cromford and High Peak Railway at Parsley Hay. This former trackbed now forms the long distance Tissington Trail cycle and footpath trail.

Thorpe was a settlement in Domesday Book, with an estimated population of 4.9 households.

== See also ==
- Listed buildings in Thorpe, Derbyshire
