= River Dove, central England =

River in Derbyshire and Staffordshire, England

Dove (Derbyshire & Staffordshire)
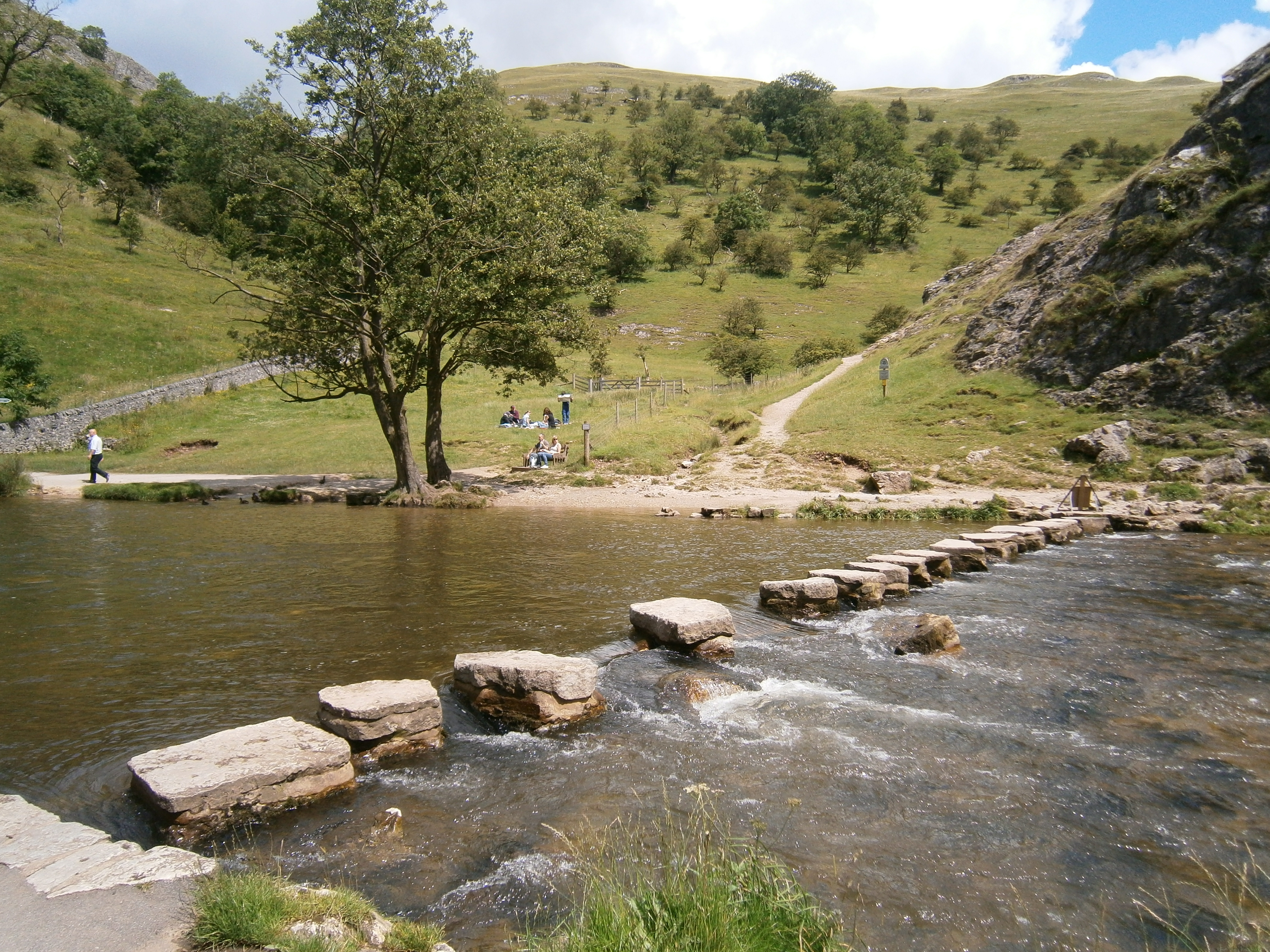
- The stepping stones over the River Dove, Dovedale

Location
- Country: England
- Region: Staffordshire, Derbyshire
- District: Beresford Dale, Wolfscote Dale, Milldale, Dovedale

Physical characteristics
- Source: Dove Head
  - location: Axe Edge Moor, Peak District, England
  - coordinates: 53°13′04″N 1°56′36″W
  - elevation: 84 m (276 ft)
- Mouth
  - location: Newton Solney, Derbyshire, England
  - coordinates: 52°49′54″N 1°35′10″W
- Length: 72 km (45 mi)

Basin features
- Tributaries
  - right: River Manifold, River Churnet

The River Dove (/dʌv/ DUV, traditionally /doʊv/ DOHV) is the principal river of the southwestern Peak District, in the Midlands of England, and is around 45 miles (72 km) in length. It rises on Axe Edge Moor near Buxton and flows generally south to its confluence with the River Trent at Newton Solney. From there, its waters reach the North Sea via the Humber Estuary. For almost its entire course it forms the boundary between the counties of Staffordshire (to the west) and Derbyshire (to the east). The river meanders past Longnor and Hartington and cuts through a set of deep limestone gorges, Beresford Dale, Wolfscote Dale, Milldale and Dovedale.

The river is a famous trout stream. Charles Cotton's Fishing House, which was the inspiration for Izaak Walton's The Compleat Angler, stands in the woods by the river near Hartington.

The river's name is now usually pronounced to rhyme with "love", but its original pronunciation rhymed with "rove". This pronunciation is still used by some residents of the lower reaches of the river.

== Dovedale ==
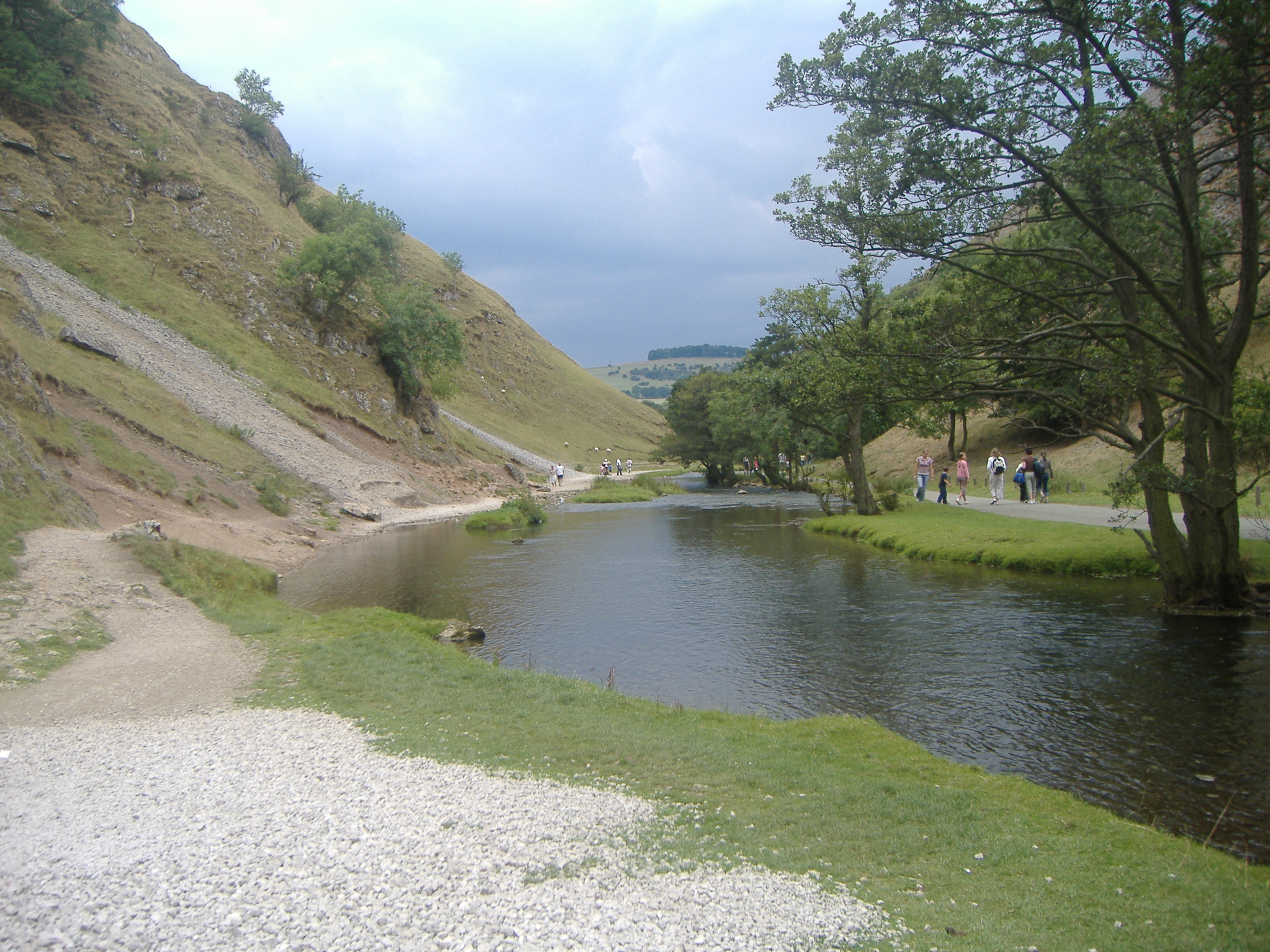
The River Dove at Dovedale

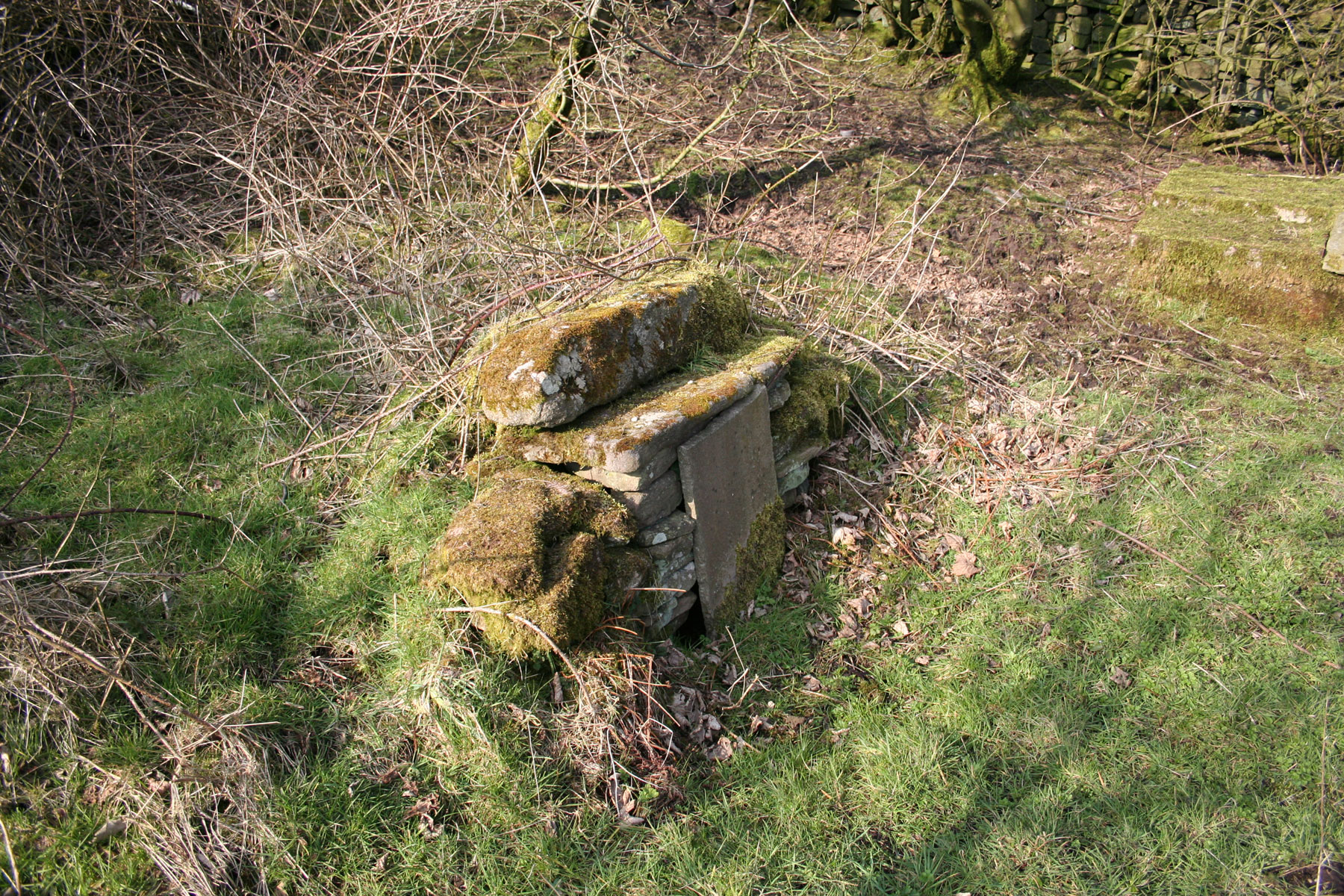
The traditional source of the River Dove (SK031684), nowadays usually dry

From Hartington to its confluence with the River Manifold at Ilam, the river flows through a series of scenic limestone valleys, known collectively as Dovedale. Dovedale is also particularly used for the name of that section between the stepping stones under Thorpe Cloud and Milldale. The Dovedale gorge is considered so scenic that it attracts a million visitors a year. Good riverside paths make the whole route accessible to walkers.

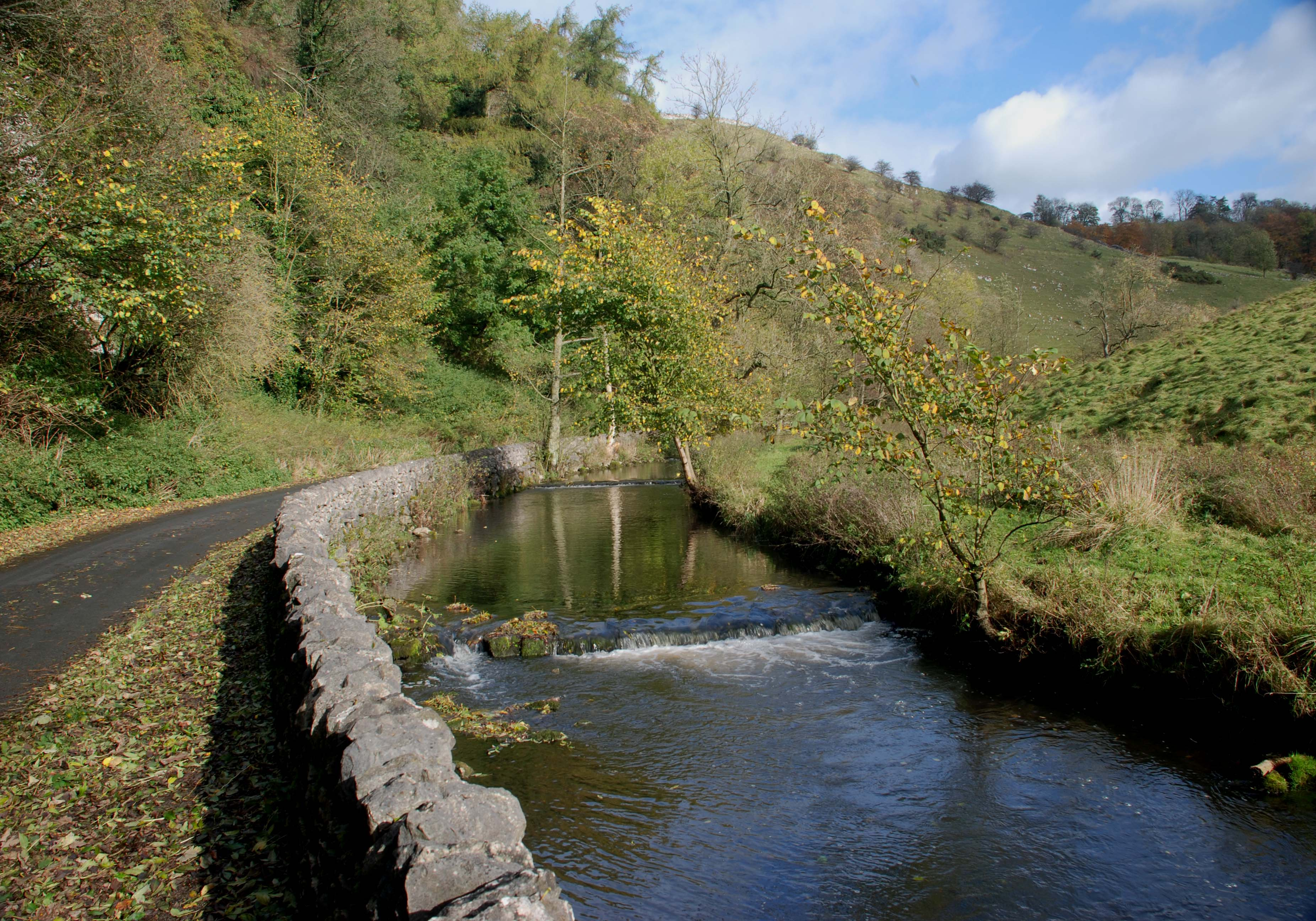
The River Dove at Milldale

Much of the dale is in the ownership of the National Trust, being part of their White Peak Estate. Dovedale itself was acquired in 1934, with successive properties being added until 1938, and Wolfscote Dale in 1948. Dovedale was declared a national nature reserve in 2006.

Dovedale's attractions include rock pillars such as Ilam Rock, Viator's Bridge, and the limestone features Lovers' Leap and Reynard's Cave.

== Lower Dove ==
Once the river leaves Dovedale it combines with the Manifold and enters a wider valley near Thorpe. The valley increases in size as the river continues south to reach Mapleton and then Mayfield, where it is crossed by the medieval Hanging Bridge. At this point it is joined by the Bentley Brook, and then nearby at Church Mayfield, by the Henmore Brook.

The Dove now flows in a south-westerly direction, passing Norbury and Ellastone, where it turns south until it reaches Rocester. To the south of the village, at Combridge it is joined by its largest tributary the River Churnet. As it reaches the ancient Dove Bridge, it is joined by the River Tean, the river now meandering through a wide valley which turns east as it passes between Doveridge and Uttoxeter; the only town along its length.

Beyond this point riverside communities, such as Marchington, Sudbury and Scropton, tend to be located at the edge of the valley; although the village of Hatton encroaches across the valley floor, where it is linked by a bridge to Tutbury whose Castle overlooks the crossing. The river continues east passing the villages of Marston, Rolleston on Dove and Egginton, where it is joined by its last tributary, the Hilton Brook. The river is divided at this point, with some flow passing through the mill fleam at Clay Mills, the two arms rejoin downstream of the A38 road bridge and Monks Bridge, and then to the south, the Dove reaches its confluence with the River Trent, at Newton Solney.

== Tributaries ==
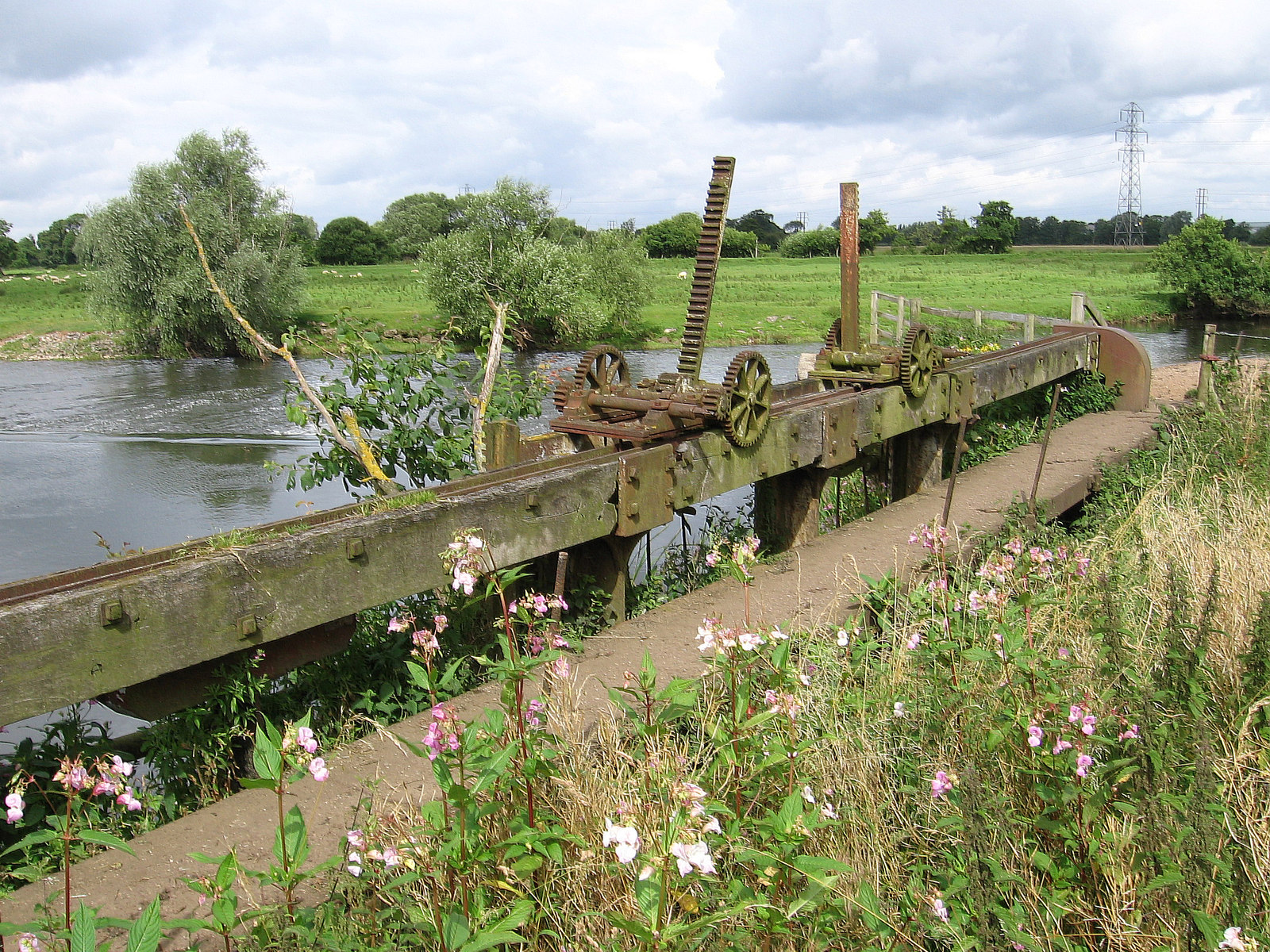
The River Dove near Tutbury (Mill Fleam Sluice)

Alphabetical list of tributaries, extracted from the Water Framework Directive list of water bodies for the River Dove:

- Alders Brook which joins the Dove near Rocester
- Bentley Brook
- River Churnet
- Foston Brook which joins the Dove near Rocester
- Henmore Brook
- Hilton Brook
- River Manifold
- Marchington Brook which joins the Dove near Marchington
- Marston Brook which joins the Dove near Marchington
- Picknall Brook which joins the Dove near Uttoxeter
- Rolleston Brook which joins the Dove near Rolleston on Dove
- River Tean which joins the Dove near Uttoxeter
- Tit Brook which joins the Dove near Ellastone

== See also ==
- List of rivers in the Peak District
- List of rivers of England
- Rivers of the United Kingdom
