= Dovedale =

Valley in the Peak District, England

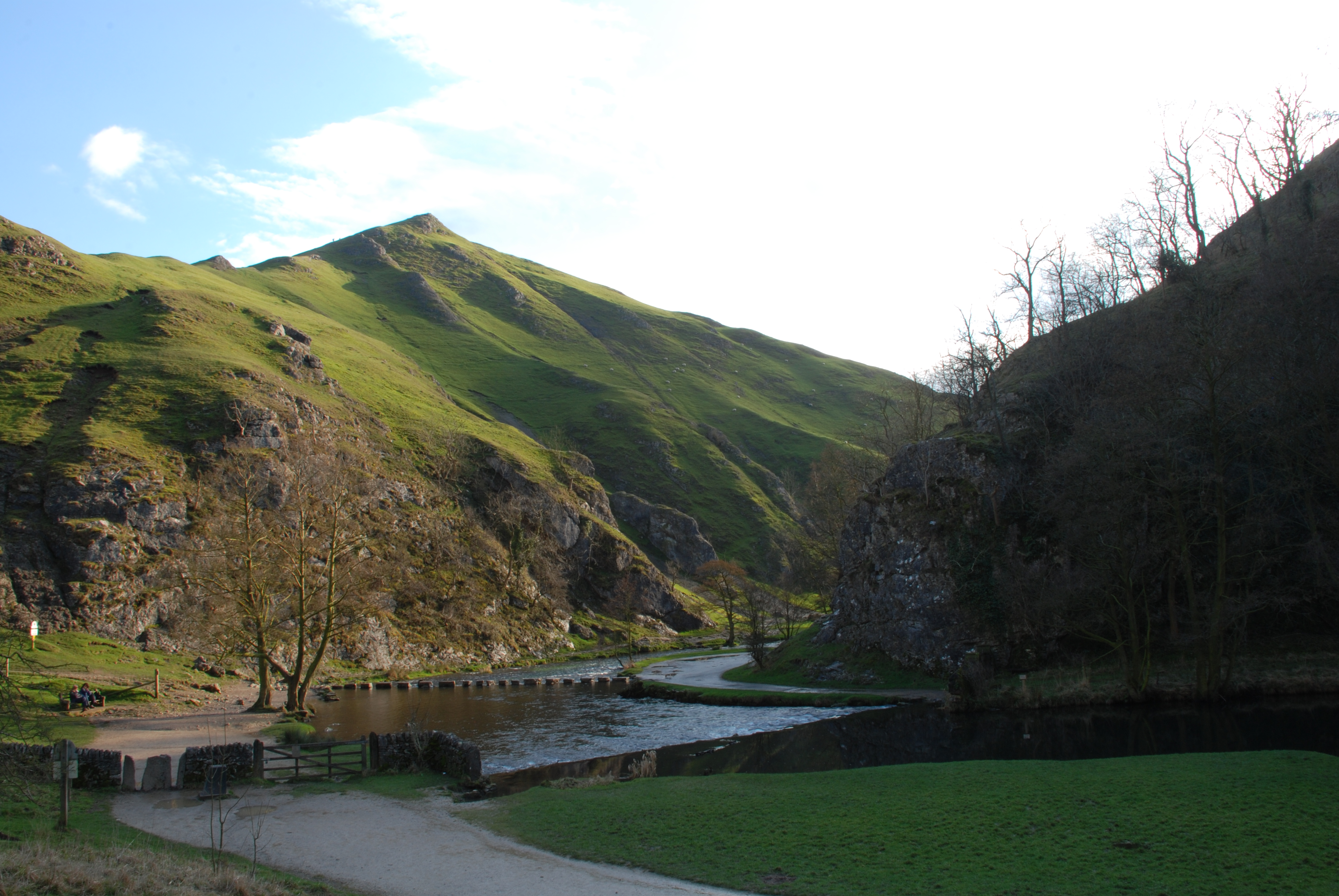
- Thorpe Cloud and Stepping Stones, Dovedale

Geography
- Location: Staffordshire and Derbyshire, England
- Coordinates: 53.060°N 1.777°W
- Rivers: River Dove
- Interactive map of Dovedale

Dovedale is a valley in the Peak District of England. The land is owned by the National Trust and attracts a million visitors annually. The valley was cut by the River Dove and runs for just over 3 miles (5 km) between Milldale in the north and a wooded ravine, near Thorpe Cloud and Bunster Hill, in the south. In the wooded ravine, a set of stepping stones cross the river and there are two caves known as the Dove Holes.

Dovedale's other attractions include rock pillars such as Ilam Rock, Viator's Bridge and the limestone features Lovers' Leap and Reynard's Cave.

== Geology ==
The limestone rock that forms the geology of Dovedale consists of the fossilised remains of sea creatures that lived in a shallow sea over the area during the Carboniferous period, about 350 million years ago. During the two ice ages, the limestone rock (known as reef limestone) was cut into craggy shapes by glacial meltwater, and dry caves such as Dove Holes and Reynard's Kitchen Cave were eventually formed.

== History ==
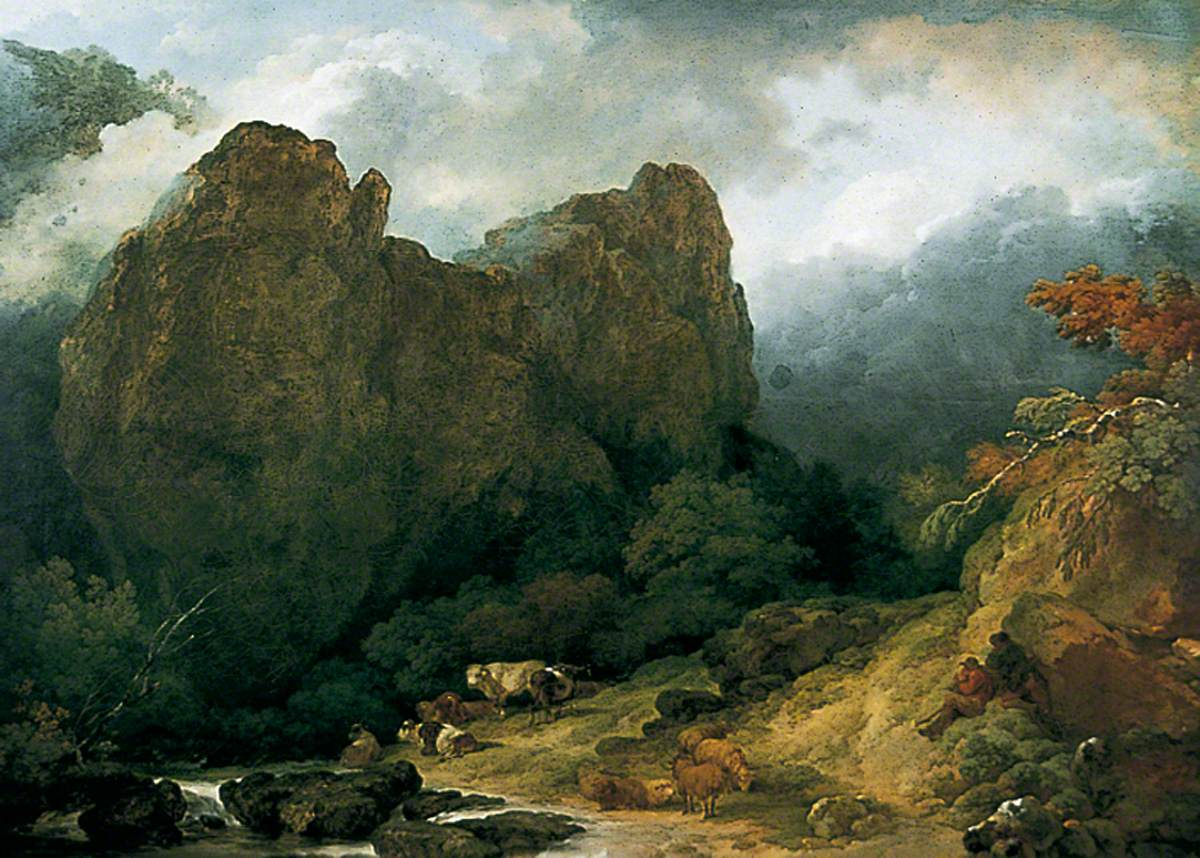
Dovedale in Derbyshire by Philip James de Loutherbourg, 1784

The caves were used as shelters by hunters around 13,000 BCE, and Dovedale has seen continuous human activity since. Around 4,500 years ago Neolithic farmers used the caves as tombs. There is evidence from Reynard's Cave of Bronze Age activity, and artifacts found there are displayed at Buxton Museum and Art Gallery.

Vikings settled in the area in the 9th century CE. Local place names such as Thorpe are of Scandinavian origin. These settlements became permanent, and Thorpe is mentioned in the Domesday Book of 1086.

Viator's Bridge, a packhorse bridge in Milldale, has been in use since the medieval period when silks and flax were transported from nearby Wetton and Alstonefield.

Tourism started in the 18th century, and Dovedale is now one of the most visited natural tourist sites in Britain.

In July 2014 it was announced that a hoard of Late Iron Age and Roman coins had been discovered in Reynard's Kitchen Cave. The 26 coins discovered, which have been declared as "treasure", included three Roman coins from before the Roman invasion of Britain, and gold and silver pieces of Late Iron Age date, which are believed to have come from the Corieltavi, a Celtic tribe based in the East Midlands. National Trust archaeologist Rachael Hall said: "The coins would suggest a serious amount of wealth and power of the individual who owned them." The coins were scheduled to go on display at Buxton Museum in late 2014.

== River Dove ==
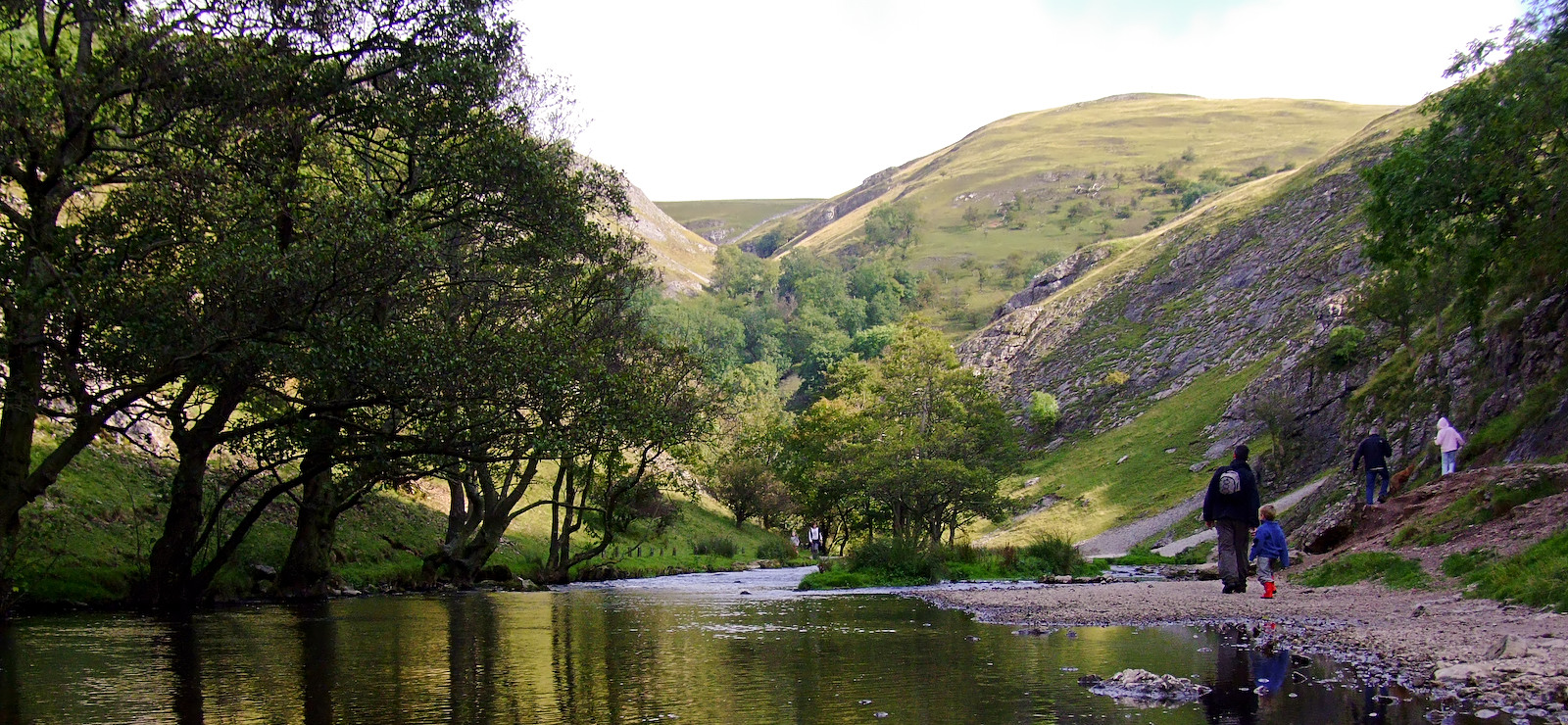
The Dove with a few walkers

The River Dove is a famous trout stream, 45 miles in length. Charles Cotton's Fishing House, the inspiration for Izaak Walton's The Compleat Angler, stands in the woods by the river. From Hartington to its confluence with the River Manifold at Ilam the River Dove flows through the scenic limestone valley known as Dove Valley, or Dovedale. From Hartington south to Ilam, a distance of eight miles (13 km), the Dove flows through Beresford Dale, Wolfscote Dale, Milldale, and then Dovedale.

== National Trust ==
Much of the dale is in the ownership of the National Trust's South Peak Estate. Dovedale was acquired in 1934, with successive properties added until 1938, and Wolfscote Dale in 1948.

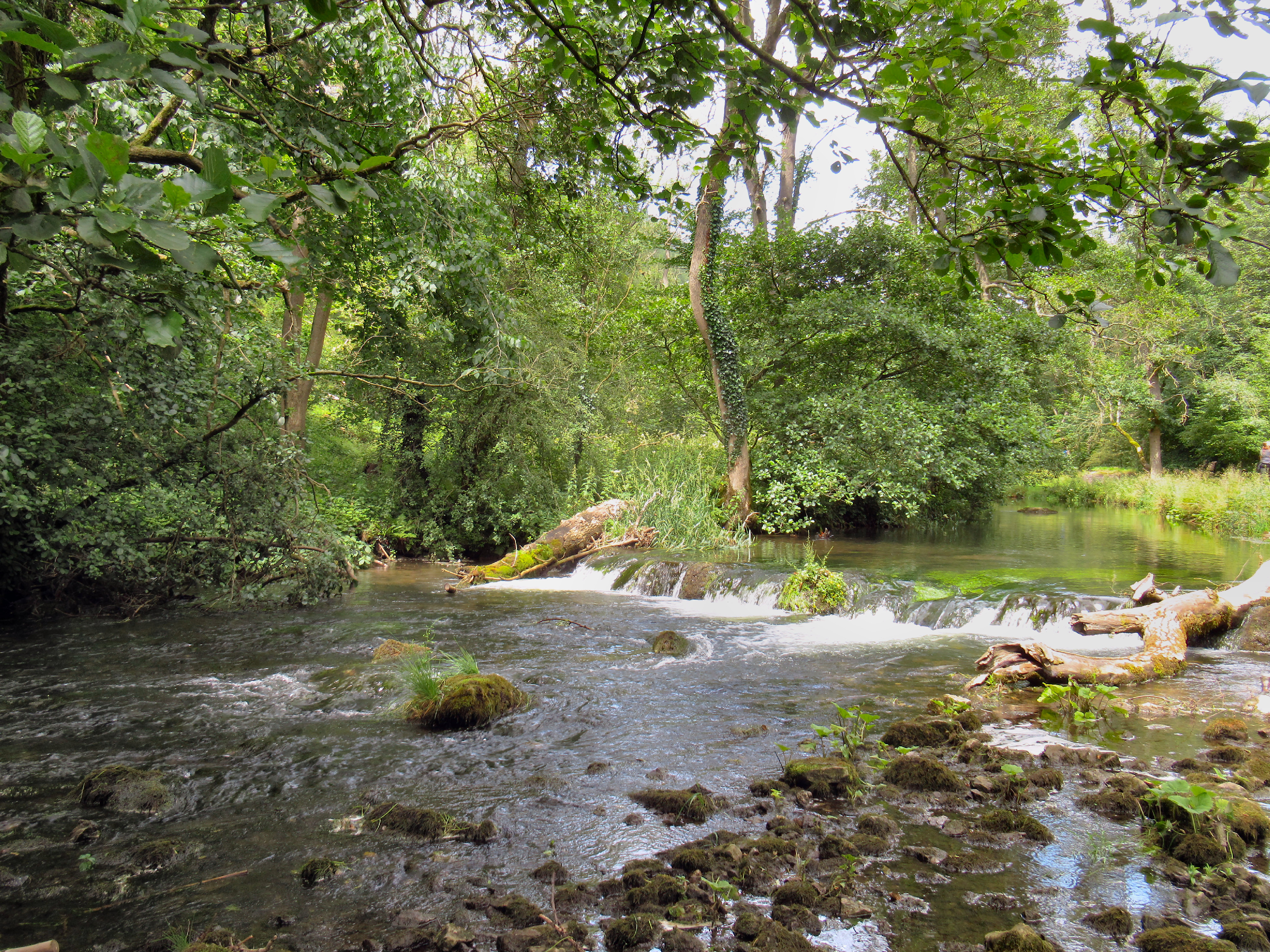
Dovedale, weir downstream from Ilam Rock

Dovedale became a national nature reserve in 2006 in recognition that it is "one of England's finest wildlife sites" with diverse plant life and interesting rock formations. The National Trust became embroiled in controversy in 2010, when in conjunction with Derbyshire County Council it oversaw the "renovation" of Dovedale's iconic stepping stones. It involved topping all but one of the stones with layers of mortar and limestone slabs.

== Thorpe Cloud ==
At the southern end of Dovedale, at grid reference SK151510 between the villages of Thorpe and Ilam, stands Thorpe Cloud, 942 ft (287 m), an isolated limestone hill known as a reef knoll. It provides a viewpoint north up the dale and south across the Midlands plain. Its name "cloud" is a derivation of the Old English word clud which means "hill". On the opposite bank, at grid reference SK141516, is the higher but less isolated Bunster Hill, 1,079 ft (329 m), which is also a reef knoll. They were acquired by the National Trust in 1934 for the South Peak Estate.

== Milldale ==
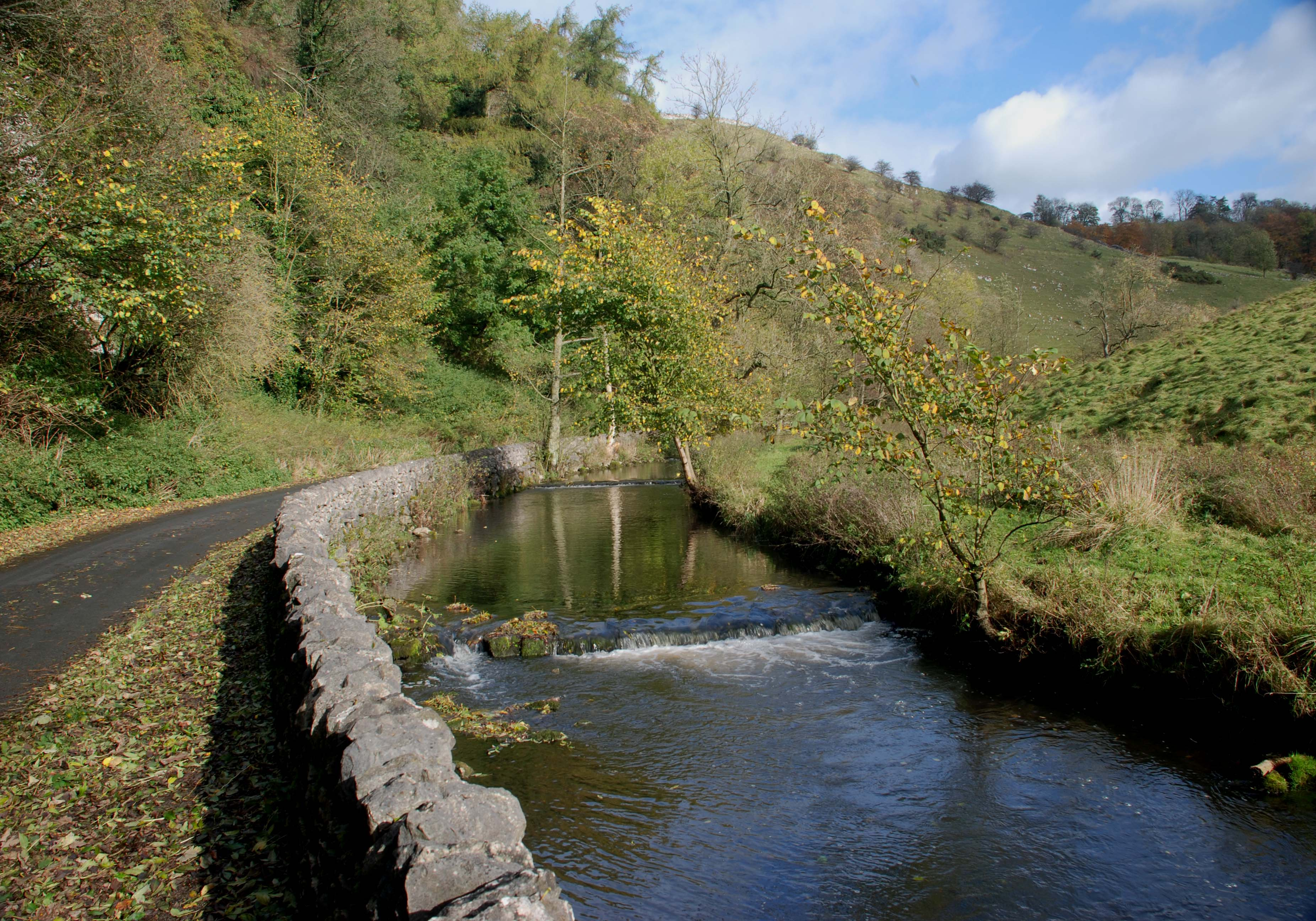
The River Dove at Milldale

Milldale is a village of stone cottages at the northern end of Dovedale and the main access point to the dale from the north. A corn mill stood here until the mid-19th century; its stables are now used as an information hut by the National Trust.

=== Viator's Bridge ===
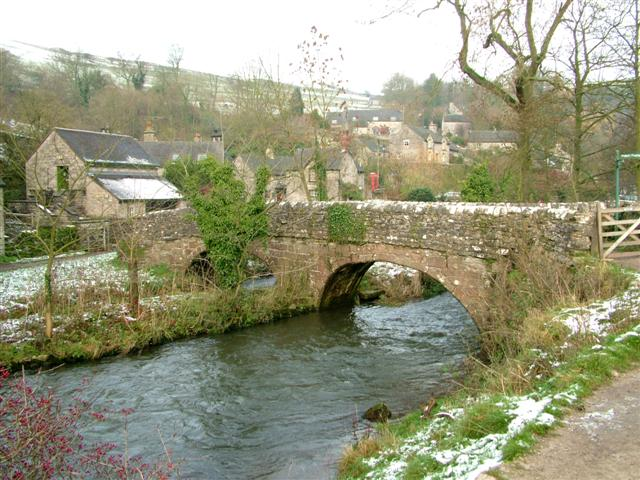
Viator's Bridge with Milldale village in the background

The ancient, narrow packhorse bridge at Milldale originally had no side walls so that horses with panniers could cross the bridge without being impeded. Izaak Walton, who refers to himself as "Viator", which is Latin for "traveller", wrote about it in The Compleat Angler:

"What’s here, the sign of a bridge? Do you travel in wheelbarrows in this country? This bridge was made for nothing else – why a mouse can hardly go over it, tis not two fingers broad!"

From this the bridge acquired the name Viator's Bridge.

The bridge has been in use since the medieval period, for packhorses transporting silks and flax from nearby Wetton and Alstonefield. It is listed as an ancient monument.

== Limestone formations ==
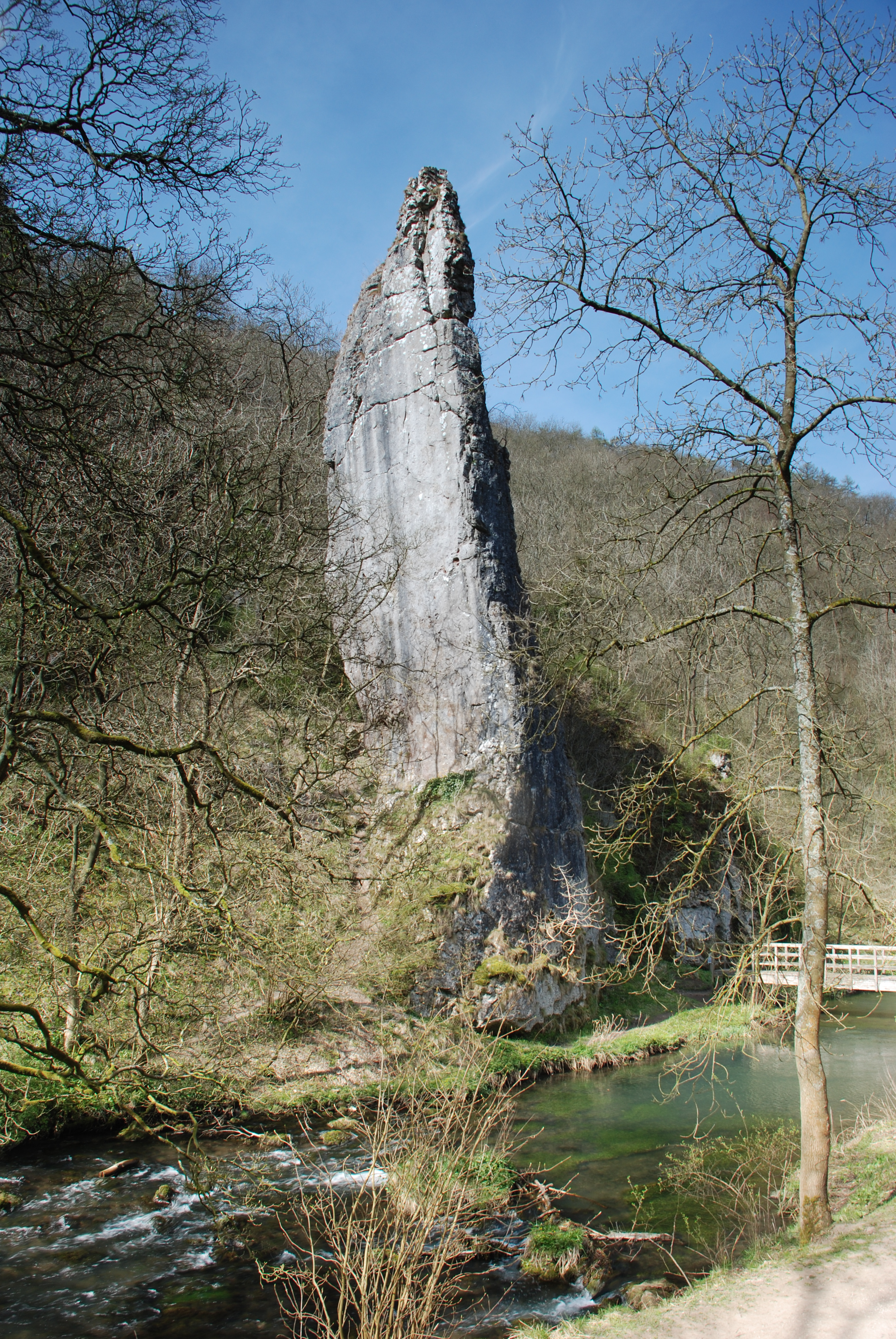
Ilam Rock

Dovedale is notable for its numerous limestone formations. The most southerly named formation, Dovedale Castle, is a short distance along the river from the stepping stones at Thorpe Cloud. The limestone promontory called Lover's Leap is accessible from a set of steps. The steps were built by Italian prisoners of war captured in the Second World War and are now maintained by the National Trust and the national park authority.

At Lover's Leap, a young woman who believed her lover had been killed in the Napoleonic Wars threw herself from the promontory. Her skirt caught in the branches of a tree as she fell and saved her life. When she got home, she heard her lover was alive. There are other similar legends about Lover's Leap, including one placing the story in World War II.

Opposite Lover's Leap is a limestone formation called the Twelve Apostles. The rock spires have been created from hard reef limestone; they protrude from the valley side, and the river has eroded the rock and soil around them. The National Trust clears plant life to ensure the rock formations are visible.

- Pickering Tor
- Tissington Spires
- Dovedale Church
- Reynard's Cave
- Lionshead Rock
- Ilam Rock
- Shepherd's Abbey
- Dove Holes

== Natural history ==
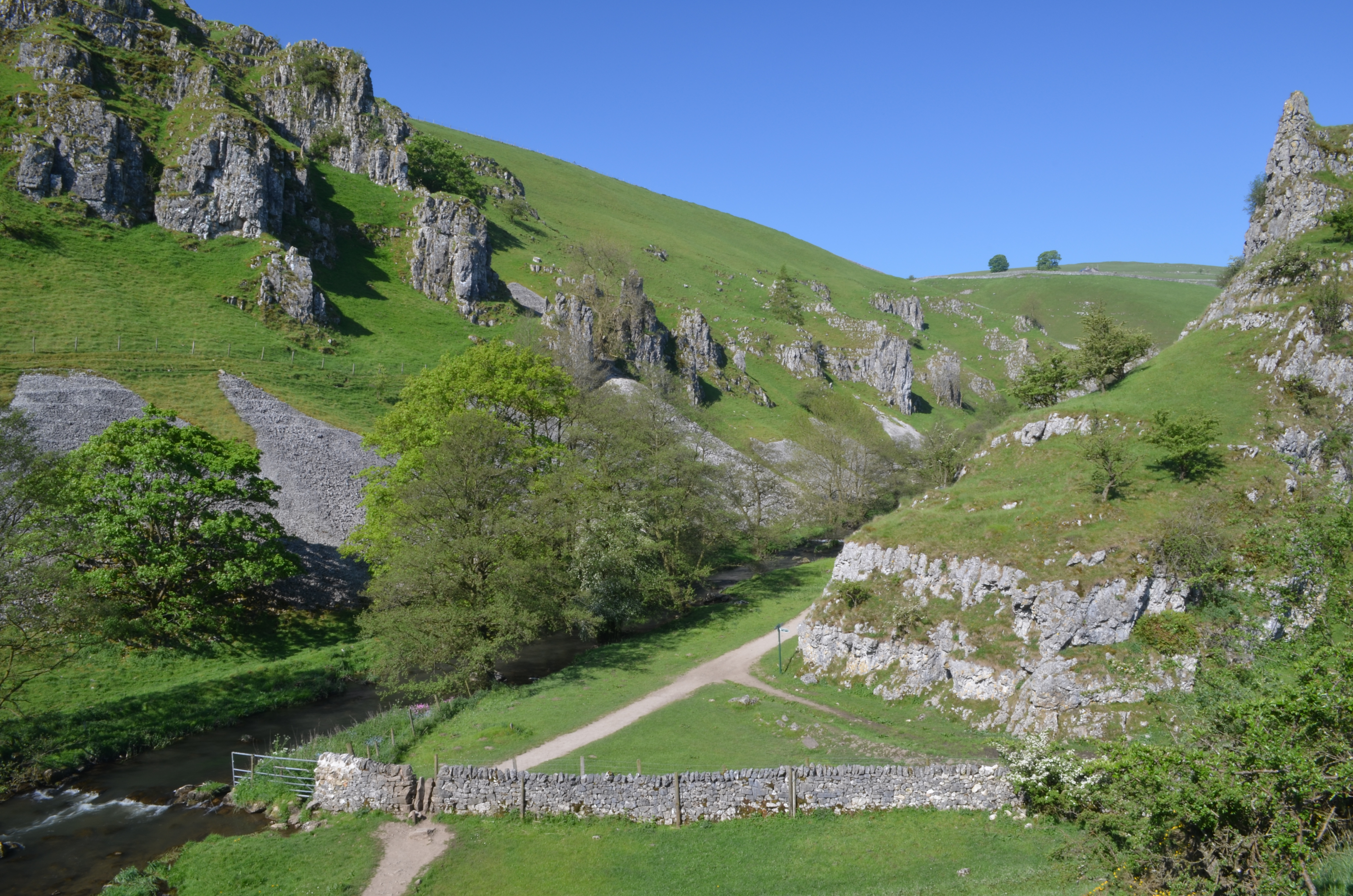
Wolfscote Dale

Dovedale is of special ecological interest for its plant life, particularly the calcareous ash woods, which are considered among the best in England. There are unusual plants such as Solomon's seal, lily of the valley, herb-paris and small and large-leaved lime trees. Birds found here include common kingfisher, grey heron and dipper.

== Tourism ==
Gentry comprised most of the visitors to Dovedale during the 18th and 19th centuries. From 1899 the Ashbourne–Buxton railway line ran to Thorpe Cloud station, above the village of Thorpe, making Dovedale more widely accessible to walkers and hikers of all social classes. Improvements in road transport facilitated travel to the area as well.

In 1931 Ramsay MacDonald's Labour government recommended creating a ‘National Park Authority’ to select natural areas for designation as national parks. Dovedale was one of the areas selected, and it was eventually included within the Peak District National Park when it became Britain's first National Park in 1951.

In July 1937, Staffordshire County Council converted the Leek and Manifold Valley Light Railway into a tarmac path now known as Manifold Way. The Ashbourne–Buxton railway line closed in the mid-1960s and was converted into a track known as Tissington Trail.

In a Peak District National Park survey conducted in 1986/87, more than a fifth of visitors said walking was their main reason for visiting. A footpath count on a Sunday in August 1990 recorded 4,421 walkers on the Staffordshire side of the river and 3,597 on the Derbyshire bank. Riverside paths make the valley accessible to walkers.

== Literary and cultural associations ==
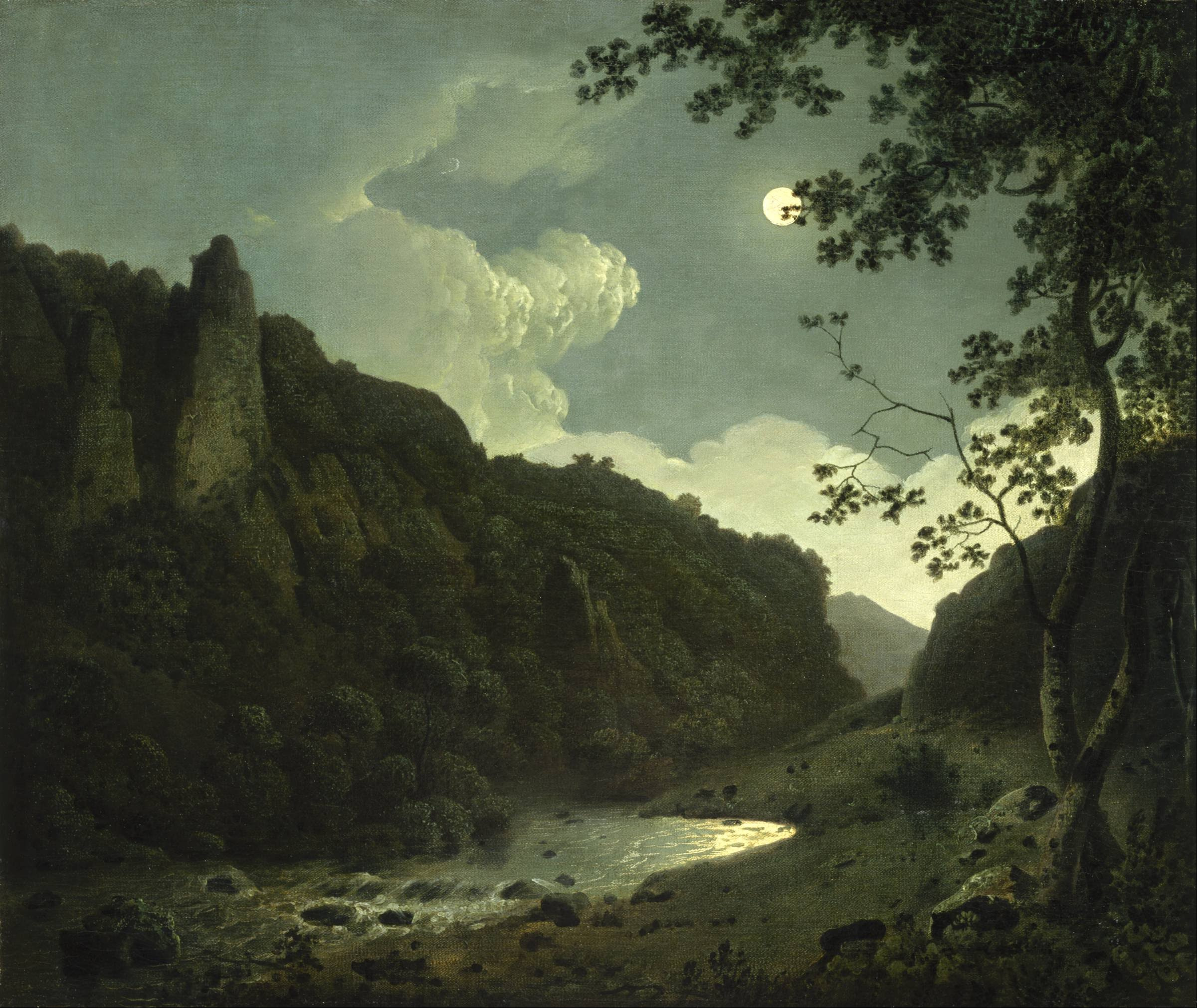
Dovedale by Moonlight, a painting by Joseph Wright of Derby, 1784.

Charles Cotton's Fishing House, the inspiration for Izaak Walton's The Compleat Angler, stands in the woods by the River Dove.

Samuel Johnson, Lord Tennyson, John Ruskin and Lord Byron all praised Dovedale's scenery. The last wrote of Dovedale to the poet Thomas Moore, "I can assure you there are things in Derbyshire as noble as Greece or Switzerland."

Elizabeth Bennet and Mr Darcy talk about her travels in Derbyshire, including Dove Dale, after they meet unexpectedly at Pemberley in Jane Austen's Pride and Prejudice.

Dovedale was featured on the 2005 BBC TV programme Seven Natural Wonders as one of the wonders of the Midlands. The stepping stones across the river figure prominently in Jorge Grau's 1974 film The Living Dead at the Manchester Morgue. The area along the river was used in Franco Zeffirelli's 1996 version and the BBC's 2006 version of Jane Eyre, and Dovedale also featured in the 2008 film The Other Boleyn Girl. The Ridley Scott film Robin Hood also used Dovedale as a location, and it can be clearly seen in several scenes towards the end of the movie.

== Dovedale Dash ==
The Dovedale Dash is an annual 4 3/4-mile (7.6 km) cross-country race along the banks of the River Dove, along Dovedale, and between the villages of Ilam and Thorpe. First organised in 1953, the race takes place on the first Sunday of October, although previously it was held on the closest Sunday to Guy Fawkes Night. The race has been cancelled on five occasions, most recently in 1998, 2000 and 2004, as a result of bad weather, and in 2020 during the COVID-19 pandemic.
