= White Peak Estate =

Country estate in Staffordshire and Derbyshire, England, UK

Coordinates: 53.055°N 1.807°W

The White Peak Estate (previously known as the South Peak Estate) of the National Trust comprises several land holdings in the Southern Peak District, now referred to as Ilam Park, Dovedale and the White Peak in National Trust publications although administered from the "White Peak Estate Office". The holdings, totalling some 3,600 acres (1,500 ha), are managed from the estate office in Ilam and comprise:

- Ilam Park, including Ilam Hall which is let to the Youth Hostel Association (YHA)
- Dovedale from Thorpe Cloud to Wolfscote Dale and Biggin Dale
- Wetton Hill and Wetton Mill
- Ossam's Hill
- Hamps Valley Woodlands (and Beeston Tor)
- Grindon Moor
- Ecton
- Land at Monyash
- Alsop Moor
- Stanton Moor Edge
- Ravenstor YHA
- Taddington Wood
- High Weeldon
- Winster Market House (the National Trust's first property in the Peak District, 1906)

Dovedale itself was acquired in 1934, and a string of acquisitions followed until 1938; Wolfscote Dale was acquired in 1948.
