= Thorpe Cloud =

Hill in United Kingdom

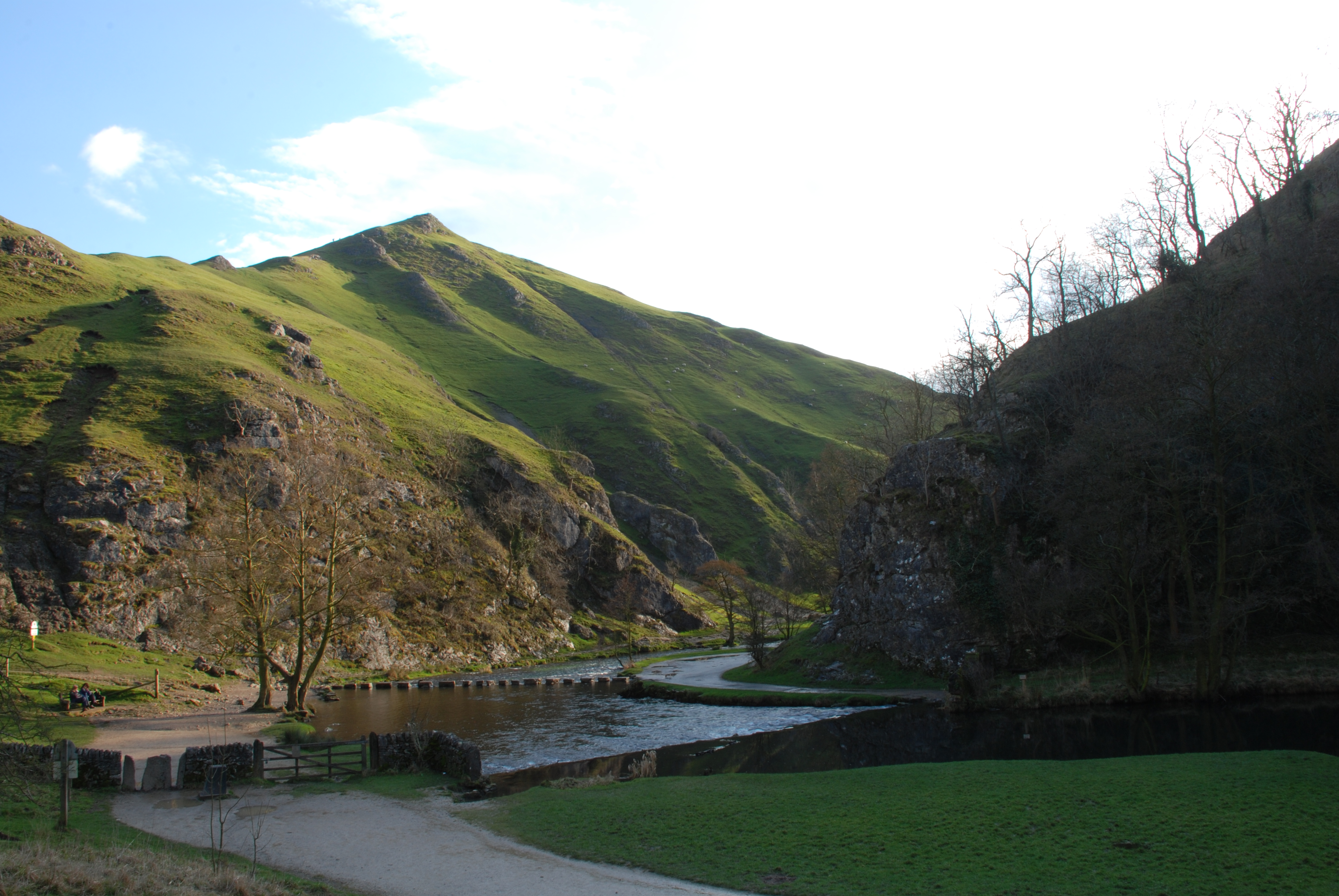
- Thorpe Cloud from Dovedale, with stepping stones

Highest point
- Elevation: 287 m (942 ft)
- Prominence: 79 m (259 ft)
- Coordinates: 53°03′22″N 1°46′34″W

Geography
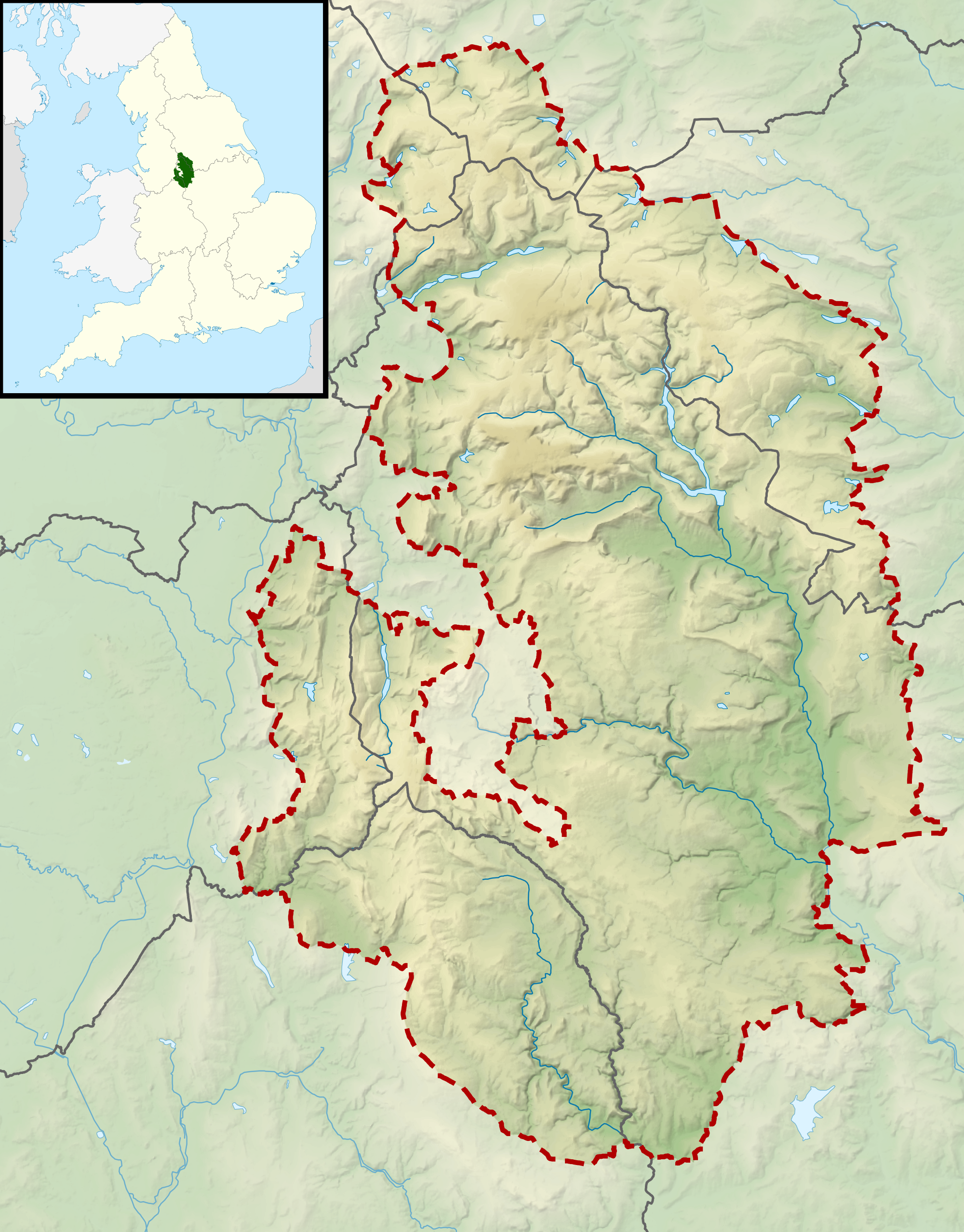
- Location within the Peak District Location within Derbyshire
- Location: Derbyshire, England
- Parent range: Peak District
- OS grid: SK151510
- Topo map: OS Landranger 119

Thorpe Cloud is an isolated limestone hill (a reef knoll) lying between the villages of Thorpe and Ilam on the Derbyshire/Staffordshire border at the southern end of Dovedale. The name "cloud" derives from the Old English word clud which means "hill". Thorpe Cloud is popular with the many day-trippers who visit the area, and provides a fine viewpoint north up the dale and south across the Midland plain.

Like much of the dale, including Bunster Hill on the opposite bank, it is in the ownership of the National Trust, and is part of their South Peak Estate. These Dovedale properties were acquired by the Trust in 1934.

A double sunset can sometimes be seen against Thorpe Cloud from the top of nearby Lin Dale, as captured on film by the photographer Chris Doherty. The occurrence is visible in good weather on and around the summer solstice and perhaps beyond, when the sun sets on the summit of the hill, partially reappears from its steep northern slope and sets for a second and final time shortly afterwards.

Thorpe Cloud and Dovedale were used as locations in the 2010 film of Robin Hood, starring Russell Crowe. Thorpe Cloud can be clearly made out in several scenes towards the end of the film.

Thorpe Cloud also has a rifle range which local and national shooting clubs use.

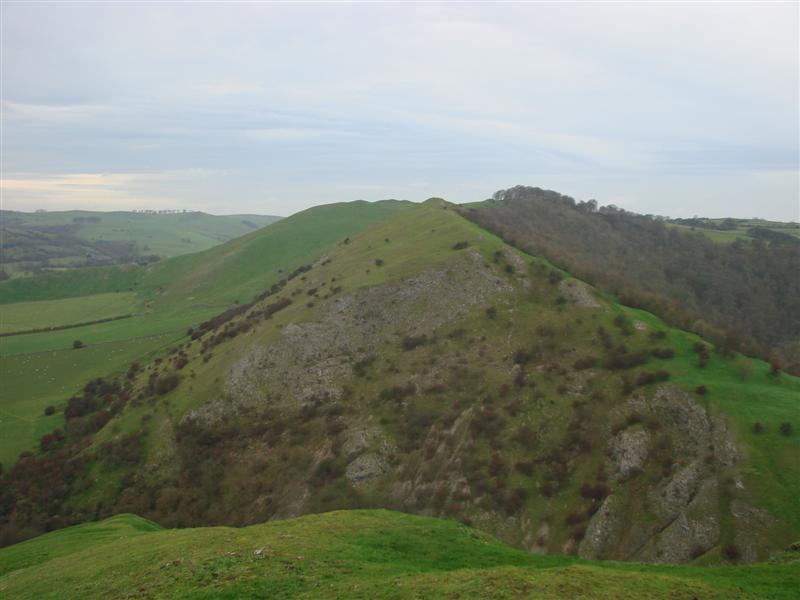
View from on the top of Thorpe Cloud looking towards Bunster Hill

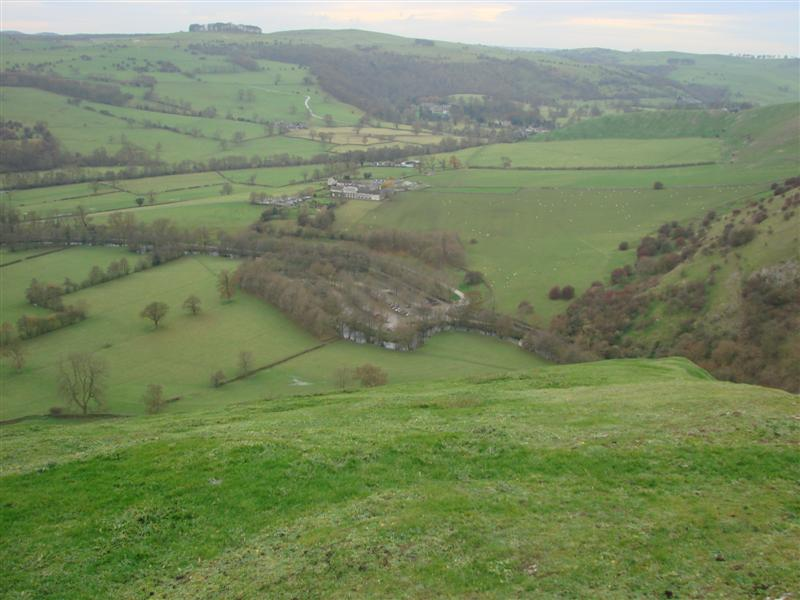
From Thorpe Cloud looking to the left of Bunster Hill with the Car Park in the middle

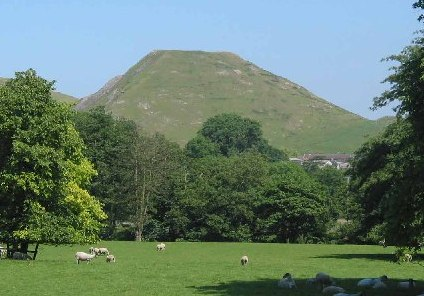
