= List of Sites of Special Scientific Interest in Staffordshire =

This is a list of the Sites of Special Scientific Interest (SSSIs) in Staffordshire, England. For other counties, see List of SSSIs by Area of Search.

- Allimore Green Common
- Alvecote Pools
- Aqualate Mere
- Baswich Meadows
- Bath Pasture
- Belvide Reservoir
- Betley Mere
- Biddulph's Pool and No Man's Bank
- Big Hyde Rough
- Black Firs and Cranberry Bog
- Blithfield Reservoir
- Braken Hurst
- Brownend Quarry
- Burnt Wood
- Caldon Dales
- Caldon Low
- Cannock Chase
- Cannock Extension Canal
- Castern Wood
- Cauldon Railway Cutting
- Chartley Moss
- Chasewater Heaths
- Checkhill Bogs
- Churnet Valley
- Colshaw Pastures
- Combes Valley
- Cop Mere
- Dimmings Dale and The Ranger
- Doley Common
- Dove Valley and Biggin Dale
- Doxey Marshes
- Ecton Copper Mines
- Ford Green Reedbed
- Forest Banks
- Four Ashes Pit
- Froghall Meadow and Pastures
- Gentleshaw Common
- Goat Lodge
- Gospel End Road Cutting
- Hamps and Manifold Valleys
- Highgate Common
- Hulme Quarry
- King's and Hargreaves Woods
- Kinver Edge
- Leek Moors
- Loynton Moss
- Maer Pool
- Metallic Tileries, Parkhouse
- Milford Quarry
- Moss Carr
- Mottey Meadows
- Old River Dove, Marston on Dove
- Pasturefields Salt Marsh
- Rawbones Meadow
- River Mease
- Rue Hill
- Saltersford Lane Meadows
- Stafford Brook
- Stanton Pastures and Cuckoocliff Valley
- Stowe Pool and Walk Mill Clay Pit
- Swineholes Wood and Blackheath
- The Wilderness and Vermin Valley
- Thorncliffe Moor
- Thorswood
- Wetley Moor Common
- Whiston Eaves
- Wollaston Ridge Quarry
