= Leekfrith =

Civil parish in Staffordshire, England

Coordinates: 53°9′N 2°1′W

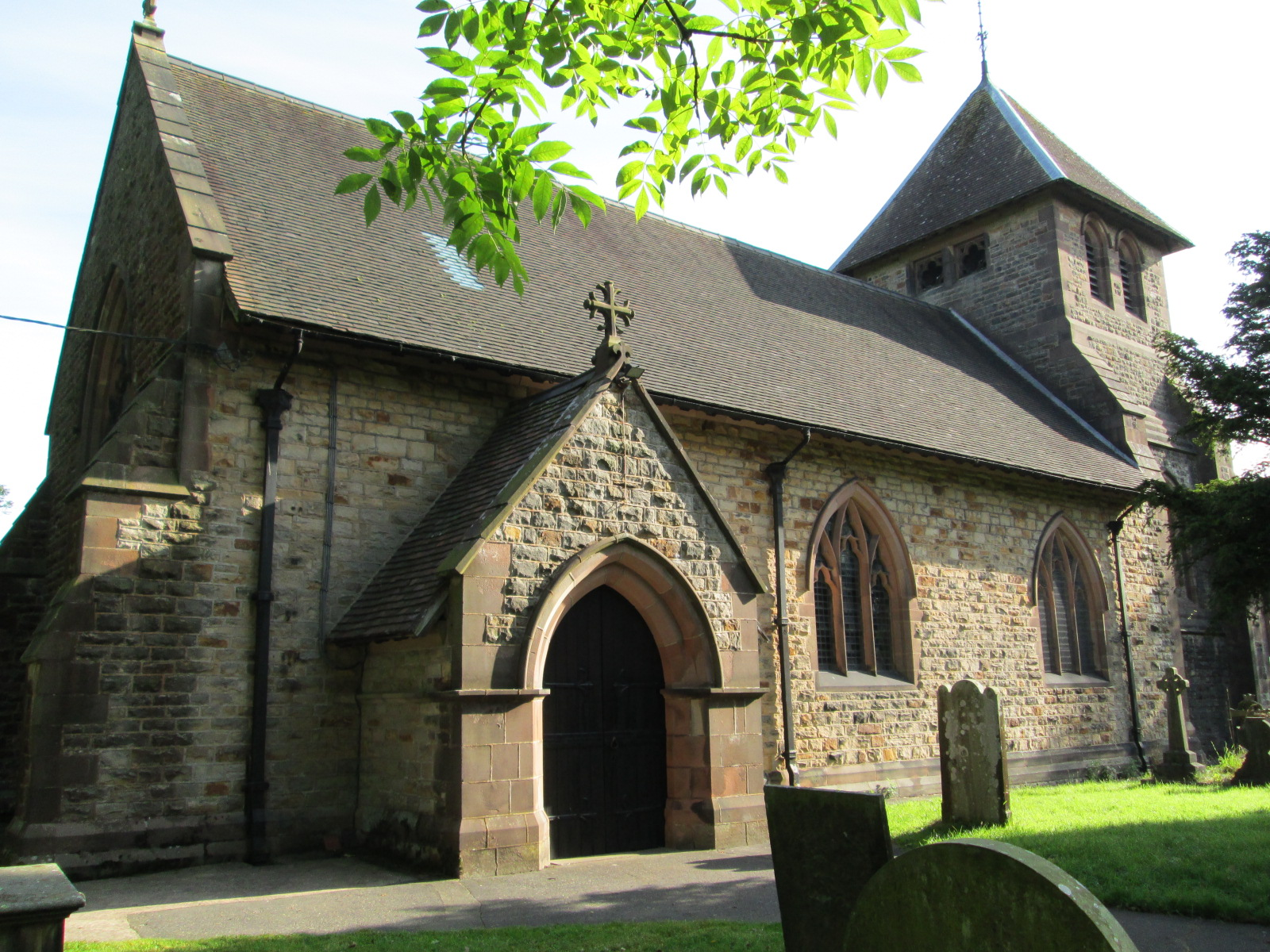
- St Matthew's Church, Meerbrook

- Location within Staffordshire
- Population: 363 (2011 census)
- Civil parish: Leekfrith
- District: Staffordshire Moorlands
- Shire county: Staffordshire
- Region: West Midlands
- Country: England
- Sovereign state: United Kingdom

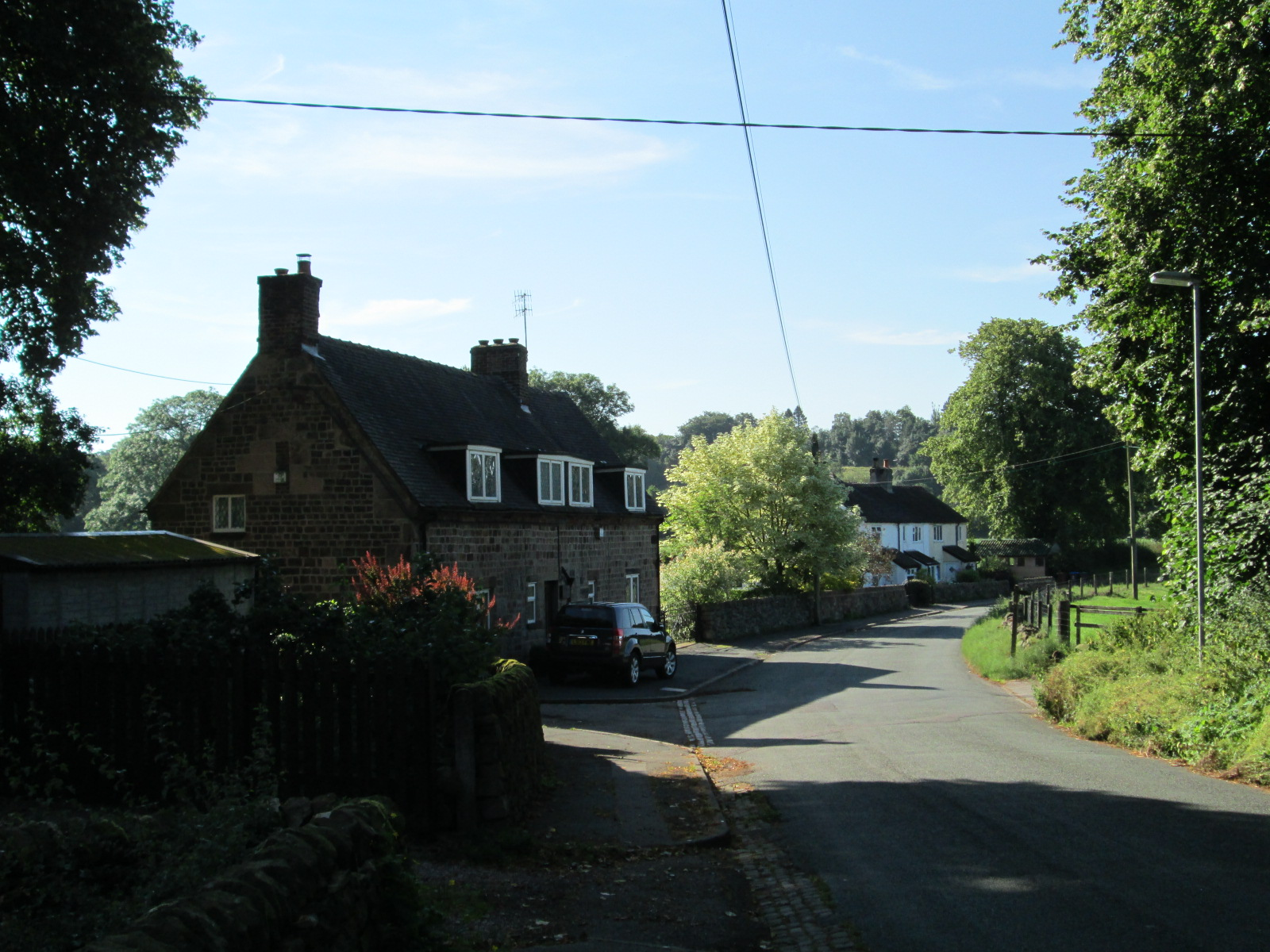
Abbey Green

Leekfrith is a civil parish in the Staffordshire Moorlands, in Staffordshire, England, north of the town of Leek. The population of the civil parish at the 2011 census was 363.

It is an area between the River Churnet which is near Leek, and the River Dane (the boundary with Cheshire) and its tributary Black Brook. The civil parishes of Heaton and Tittesworth are to the west and east.

The civil parish includes the village of Meerbrook, the Roaches (a rocky ridge in the north-east) and most of Tittesworth Reservoir. A chasm known as Lud's Church is near the River Dane. A hill named Gun is at the western boundary, and the village of Upper Hulme is near the eastern boundary.

The ground is of boulder clay, and the underlying rock is millstone grit. The soil is loam and clay. The land is used mostly as pasture.

== History ==
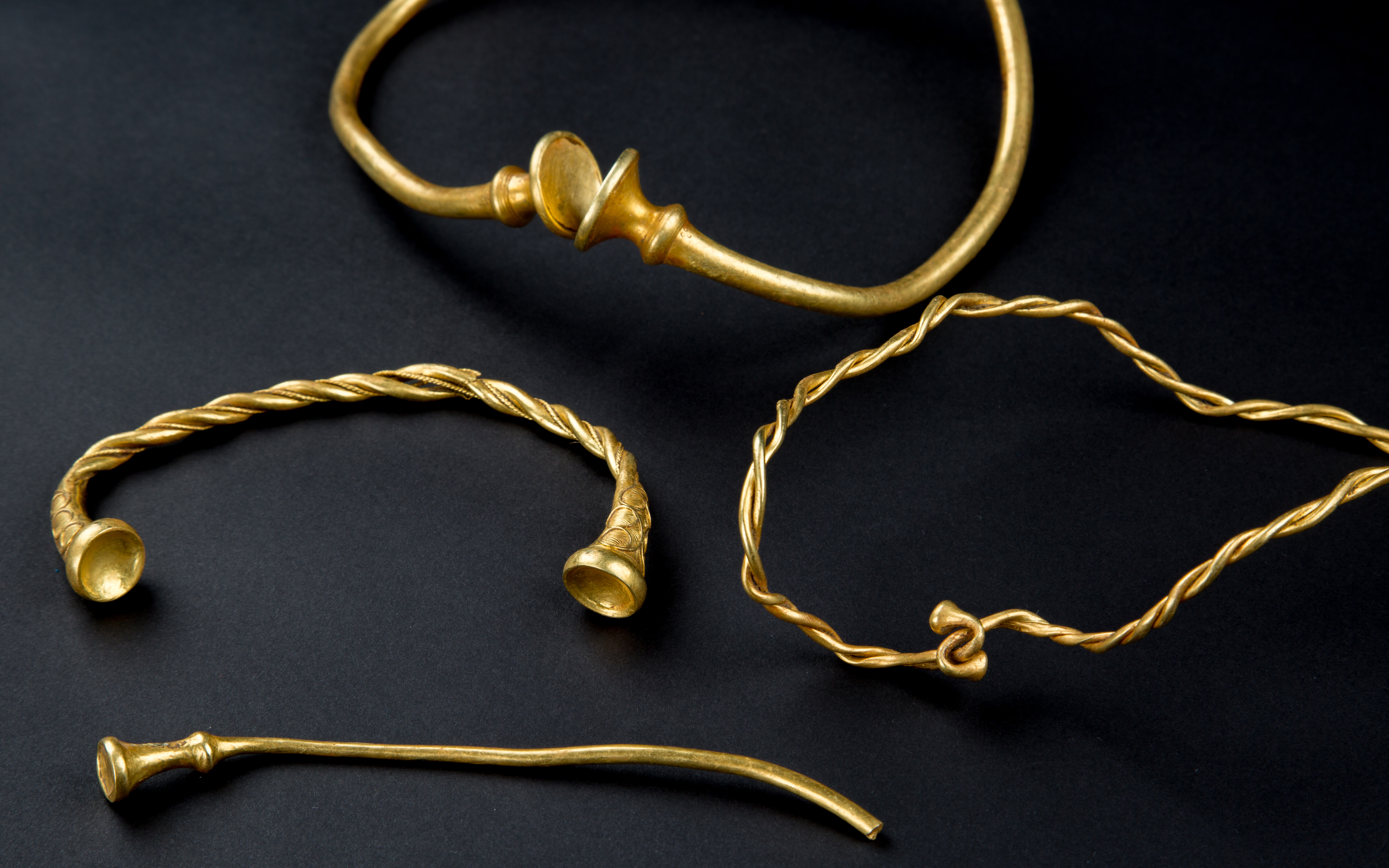
Four gold torcs dating from the Iron Age found at Leekfrith in 2016

The word frith means a wood; much of the area was wooded countryside in medieval times, and some survives north-east of Abbey Green.

Leekfrith was historically a township in the large ancient parish of Leek. It became a separate civil parish in 1866. Until 1934 the township included the village of Abbey Green, but in that year Abbey Green and an area immediately north of the River Churnet was transferred to Leek.

Dieulacres Abbey, near the present Abbey Green, was founded by Ranulf de Blondeville, 6th Earl of Chester, lord of the manor of Leek. Around 1220 the Earl granted the monks an area known as the Rudyard Estate, in the south-west of Leekfrith, where the abbey was built. The village of Abbey Green probably began as an open space at the abbey gate. The abbey owned monastic granges in Leekfrith at Roche Grange, Wetwood and Foker.

Dieulacres Abbey was surrendered in 1538 at the dissolution of the monasteries, and the present Abbey Farm stands on part of the site.

In December 2016 four Iron Age gold torcs were found in a field, by two metal detectorists.

== See also ==
- Listed buildings in Leekfrith
