= Balterley Heath =

Coordinates: 53.052°N 02.379°W

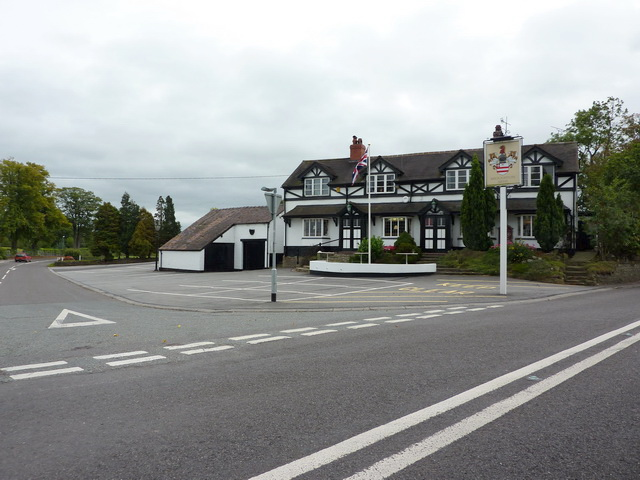
- Broughton Arms at the junction of B5500 with A531

- Location within Cheshire
- OS grid reference: SJ7450
- Shire county: Cheshire
- Region: North West
- Country: England
- Sovereign state: United Kingdom
- Police: Cheshire
- Fire: Cheshire
- Ambulance: North West

Balterley Heath is a village in the traditional county of Cheshire, England. It is now part of Balterley in the administrative county of Staffordshire.

Balterley Heath is situated at the junction of the B5500 road with the A531 road, directly at the boundary of Staffordshire and Cheshire East.

Black Firs and Cranberry Bog, a nature reserve of Staffordshire Wildlife Trust, is nearby.

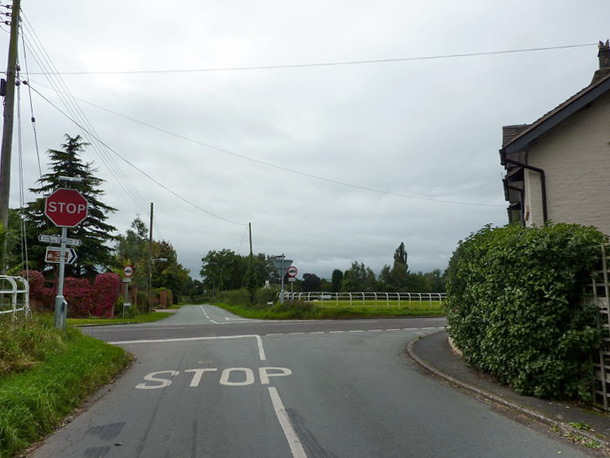
Crossroads in Balterley Heath
