= Doxey =

Village in Staffordshire, England

- Location within the United Kingdom
- Population: 2,364 (2011)
- OS grid reference: SJ9004923850
- Civil parish: Doxey
- District: Stafford
- Shire county: Staffordshire
- Country: England
- Sovereign state: United Kingdom
- Post town: STAFFORD
- Postcode district: ST16
- Dialling code: 01785
- UK Parliament: Stafford

Doxey is a civil parish within the borough of Stafford, in Staffordshire, England; it is a north-western suburb of the town of Stafford. It became a civil parish on 1 April 2005.

== Toponymy ==
There is some uncertainty about the origin of the name Doxey, but it seems that it was originally Dokesei; this may be "Ducks Island" - a reference to the fact that the centre of Doxey would have been surrounded by marsh. In the Domesday Book, it is spelt Dochesig.

== Geography ==
The new parish is bound by the West Coast Main Line, the River Sow and Doxey Marshes to the north, and the M6 motorway to the west. To the south, an area of low-lying agricultural land leading to Stafford Castle and the Way for the Millennium footpath.

== Education ==
- Doxey Playgroup
- Doxey Primary and Nursery School School
- King Edward VI High School - Highfields
- Blessed William Howard Catholic School
- Stafford Grammar School (Private).

== Churches ==
- St Thomas and St Andrew Church of England - a distinctive building built in 1975, replacing the now demolished St Thomas in Derby St. and the small St Andrew church (near Doxey Stores, opposite The Drive)
- The New Testament Church of God

== Transport ==
Select Bus Services operates routes 12 and 12S between Doxey and Stafford town centre.

Stafford railway station is a principal stop on the West Coast Main Line. Avanti West Coast and CrossCountry provide frequent inter-city services to London Euston, Birmingham New Street, Liverpool Lime Street, Manchester Piccadilly, Reading and Bournemouth.

The road through the area links Stafford town centre with Seighford and Derrington. Doxey is the site of a motorway maintenance area for the M6 and is used as an access point for the emergency services.

== Leisure ==
Doxey has easy access to a number of walking and cycling routes:

- The Way for the Millennium footpath was previously the Stafford-Newport-Shrewsbury railway line and is now established as the Greenway.
- Doxey to Stafford Castle Doorstep Walk
- Doxey Marshes and Tillington Doorstep Walk

There is a 300-acre (120 ha) wet grassland site, located in the heart of Stafford, known as Doxey Marshes; it connects to additional walking and cycle paths and is managed by Staffordshire Wildlife Trust.

== Listed buildings ==
Doxey contains two listed buildings that are recorded in the National Heritage List for England. Both the listed buildings are designated at Grade II, which is applied to "buildings of national importance and special interest." Both listed buildings are houses, one with its original part timber framed and the other in Georgian style.

Name and location	Photograph	Date	Notes
146 Doxey Road; 52.81090°N 2.14744°W	—	Late 17th or early 18th century	The house was extended in the 19th century by the addition of wings. The original part is timber framed, the wings are in painted brick, and the roof is tiled. There is one storey and an attic, a main range of two bays, a single-storey right wing, and a rear gabled wing. On the front is a small porch with a hipped roof, and the windows are square with two lights and leaded glazing.
Doxey House; 52.81084°N 2.14802°W	—	c. 1840	The house incorporates part of an earlier farmhouse at the rear. It is in brick with stone dressings and a tile roof. The house is in Georgian style, and has two storeys, and a symmetrical front of three bays. On the front is a porch with a cornice and scrolled cresting, and the doorway has a moulded surround and flanking round-headed lights. There is one top-hung casement window, and the other windows are sashes, those on the front with wedge lintels.

== Notable people ==
- Stanley Gobey (1916 in Doxey – 1992) was an English first-class cricketer, who played for Warwickshire in 1946.
