= Meerbrook =

Village in Staffordshire, England

Coordinates: 53°08′44″N 2°01′2″W

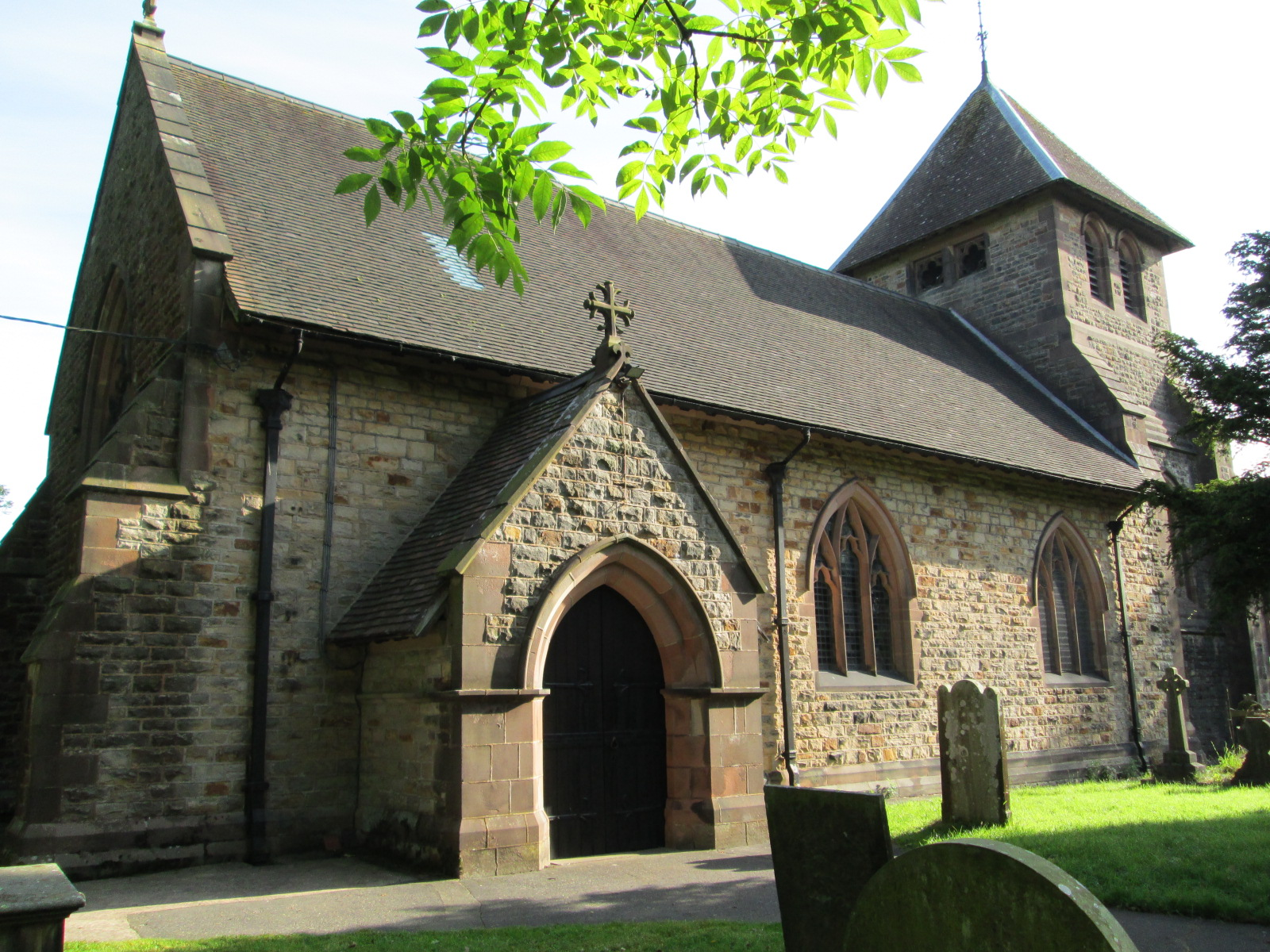
St Matthew's Church, Meerbrook

Meerbrook (grid reference SJ989609) is a small village in north Staffordshire, on the River Churnet at the edge of the Peak District National Park. It is situated four miles north of the town of Leek, in the parish of Leekfrith. The Roaches and Hen Cloud, popular walking and climbing locations, are very nearby.

== History ==
The area grew with the expansion of the early medieval wool industry, and the Cistercian Abbey of Dieulacres held three sheep farms in the village. A chapel was built in 1537, later serving as a schoolroom with a paid schoolmaster until around the 1780s. The present church of St. Matthew sits in the centre of the village, and was built 1870–1873.

The local Meerbrook coalfield was dug commercially from around the 1600s, until 1878. The adit or sough to provide drainage for the mine is over four miles (6.4 km) long.

Part of the village was submerged under the man-made Tittesworth reservoir in the early 1960s. There was a silk manufacturing mill, but this closed in 1970. Meerbrook's village school closed in 1969, and the building is now a youth hostel.

== Today ==
Situated between The Roaches and Tittesworth Reservoir, Meerbrook provides a base for a wide variety of outdoor leisure activities. There is a pub, The Lazy Trout, and the Meerbrook Youth Hostel. There is a large and modern Village Hall located just to the west of the village. An annual Scarecrow Festival is held each May. The Peak District Boundary Walk runs through the village.

== See also ==
- Listed buildings in Leekfrith
