= Black Brook Nature Reserve =

Nature reserve in Staffordshire, England

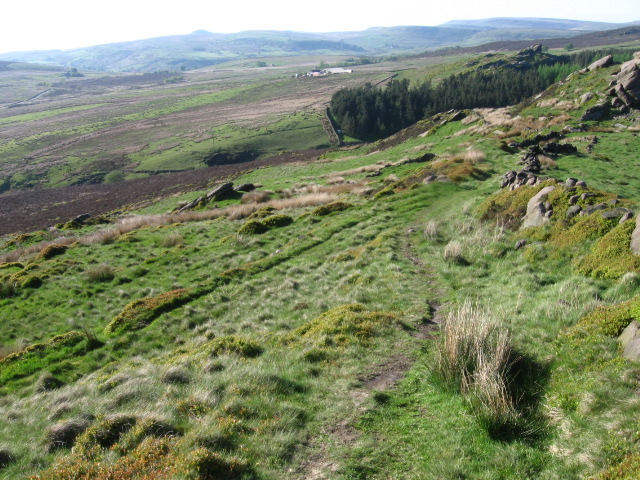

- Location within Staffordshire
- Interactive map of Black Brook Nature Reserve
- Location: near Leek, Staffordshire
- OS grid: SK 020 644
- Coordinates: 53°10′36″N 1°58′17″W
- Area: 121 hectares (300 acres)
- Operator: Staffordshire Wildlife Trust
- Designation: Site of Special Scientific Interest; Special Area of Conservation
- Website: www.staffs-wildlife.org.uk/nature-reserves/black-brook

Black Brook is a nature reserve of the Staffordshire Wildlife Trust, about 7 miles (11 km) north-east of Leek, in Staffordshire, England.

It is moorland, part of Leek Moors (a Site of Special Scientific Interest), and most of it is in a Special Area of Conservation. It is near to the Roaches, another nature reserve of the Trust.

== Description ==
The reserve was bought by the Trust in 1996. Its area is 121 hectares (300 acres), one of the Trust's largest reserves. The moorland is a habitat for many endangered upland birds. Bird species seen in the reserve include curlew, red grouse and short-eared owl.

Moorland plants amongst the heather include bilberry, crowberry and cowberry; these attract particular species of butterflies, moths and other insects, notably the green hairstreak butterfly.

=== Restoration project ===
Two-thirds of the reserve is moorland, and one-third is a conifer plantation, planted in the 1970s and never harvested. The Trust plans in the long term to remove the plantation, so the land can be more beneficial to wildlife. This work began in 2002. Land has been returned to moorland, and over 7,500 broadleaf trees such as oak, rowan and hazel have been planted, to create a future broadleaf woodland. This new terrain will support a wide variety of wildlife.
