= Listed buildings in Leekfrith =

Leekfrith is a civil parish in the district of Staffordshire Moorlands, Staffordshire, England. It contains 23 listed buildings that are recorded in the National Heritage List for England. Of these, two are at Grade II*, the middle of the three grades, and the others are at Grade II, the lowest grade. The parish contains the village of Meerbrook and the hamlet of Upper Hulme, and is otherwise rural. Most of the listed buildings are houses and associated structures, cottages, farmhouses and farm buildings. The other listed buildings include a church and a memorial in the churchyard, a chapel, a former school, and a telephone kiosk.

== Key ==
Grade	Criteria
II*	Particularly important buildings of more than special interest
II	Buildings of national importance and special interest

== Buildings ==
Name and location	Photograph	Date	Notes	Grade
Windygates Hall; 53.15348°N 1.99521°W		1634	A farmhouse in stone on a plinth, that has a stone slate roof with verge parapets and shaped finials. There are two storeys and an attic, and an H-shaped plan, consisting of a central range flanked by projecting gabled wings. The doorway has pilasters with moulded capitals, and a frieze double-stepped up over a dated and initialed plaque. The windows have moulded mullions and transoms with hood moulds, and in the attics are five-light windows stepped up in three tiers.	II*
Buxton Brow Farmhouse; 53.17514°N 2.02232°W	—	17th century	The farmhouse is in stone and has a stone slate roof with verge parapets. There are two storeys and three bays. On the front is a gabled porch, and the windows are two-light casements with chamfered mullions.	II
Barn northeast of Buxton Brow Farmhouse; 53.17515°N 2.02191°W	—	17th century	The barn is in stone, and has a stone slate roof with verge parapets on corbelled kneelers. There are two levels, consisting of a hay loft over byres. The barn contains hay loft doors, top-hung casement windows, and doorways, one with a heavy lintel and a moulded cornice.	II
Foulds Farmhouse; 53.12580°N 2.03633°W	—	17th century	The farmhouse is in stone and has a roof of blue tiles. There are two storeys and three bays, the right bay projecting and gabled. In the middle of the ground floor is an eight-light window with chamfered mullions and a moulded hood mould, and the other windows are casements, some are cross windows, and others have mullions.	II
Middle Hulme Farmhouse; 53.14095°N 2.00247°W	—	17th century	The farmhouse is in stone with quoins, and a blue tile roof that has verge parapets with moulded copings and shaped corbelled kneelers on the left. There are two storeys and an H-shaped plan with two gables, the right gable projecting more. The windows are casements with moulded mullions.	II
Thornleigh Hall; 53.16347°N 2.03291°W	—	17th century	A stone farmhouse on a plinth that has a stone slate roof with verge parapets. There are two storeys and a cellar, and a front of three bays. The windows have chamfered mullions and hood moulds.	II
Garden wall and entrance, Thornleigh Hall; 53.16338°N 2.03282°W	—	1691	The garden wall to the south of the house is in stone with pitched coping, it is about 2 metres (6 ft 7 in) high, and extends for about 4 metres (13 ft) on each side of the entrance. At the entrance is a chamfered flat arch with an inscription in a triangle.	II
Barn east of Thornleigh Hall; 53.16343°N 2.03255°W	—	1760	The barn is in stone with a stone slate roof, and two levels, consisting of a hay loft over a byre. It contains top-hung casement windows, two with Tudor arched heads, doorways with similar heads, and hay loft doors.To the right is a later lean-to extension.	II
Buttyfold Farmhouse; 53.14598°N 1.98581°W	—	Early 18th century	The farmhouse, which was later altered, is in stone with moulded string courses, and a tile roof. There are two storeys and an attic, and an L-shaped plan, consisting of a three-bay main range and a lower projecting wing. The porch is gabled and has verge parapets on shaped kneelers and a finial. The windows are casements, and there are two gabled dormers with finials. In the wing is a doorway with a heavy lintel.	II
Frith Bottom Farmhouse; 53.14903°N 2.01150°W	—	Early 18th century	The farmhouse, which was extended in the 19th century, is in red brick with stone dressings, rusticated quoins, and a slate roof with verge parapets and ball finials. There are two storeys, originally an L-shaped plan, later infilled, and a front of three bays. In the centre is a doorway with a moulded architrave and a pediment on brackets. There is one replacement casement window, and the other windows are sashes with rusticated voussoir heads, the window above the doorway has a mounded architrave ramped up to a keystone. There are three gabled half-dormers.	II
Marsh Farmhouse and outbuildings 53.14198°N 2.00937°W	—	Early 18th century (possible)	The buildings were altered and extended in the 19th century. They are in stone with a blue tile roof, and the house and outbuildings form a single range. The house has two storeys and two bays, and contains a doorway and casement windows. The outbuildings contain a four-light mullioned and transomed window, a segmental-arched cart entry, and a datestone, and at the right end is a stable.	II
School and School House; 53.14417°N 2.01678°W		Early 18th century	The former school and schoolmaster's house are in stone and red brick, with rusticated quoins, voussoirs, and a sill band, and have a roof of tile and stone slate. There are two storeys and four bays, with the school on the left. The windows are casements, with small panes in the house. On the roof is a gabled bellcote.	II
Barn northeast of Frith Bottom Farmhouse; 53.14920°N 2.01129°W	—	1740	The barn is in stone and has a tile roof, an L-shaped plan, and two levels consisting of a hay loft over byres. It contains casement windows, a hay loft door, other doors, and external stone steps leading to an upper floor door near the angle.	II
Thornleigh Green Farmhouse; 53.16323°N 2.03361°W	—	18th century	The farmhouse is in stone with a stone slate roof, three storeys and two bays. The doorway has a corbelled hood, and the windows are small-pane mullioned casements.	II
Oxhay Farmhouse; 53.14370°N 2.02872°W	—	Late 18th century	A stone farmhouse that has a stone slate roof with verge parapets, two storeys and an attic, three bays, and a later lean-to extension on the right. The windows are mullioned casements.	II
Barn south of Windygates Hall; 53.15312°N 1.99503°W	—	Late 18th century	The barn, which was later extended, is in stone, and has roofs of stone slate and blue tile. There are two levels, consisting of a hay loft over byres, and the barn is in three parts stepped down a slope. The upper range contains hay loft doors, casement windows with stone lintels, and boarded doors, one with a heavy lintel. In the middle range are a hay loft door, top-hung casement windows, and a doorway with a dated lintel, the lower range contains a sliding door, and on the left gable end are external steps.	II
Methodist Chapel; 53.14417°N 2.01678°W		Early 19th century	The chapel is in stone with quoins, and has a tile roof. On the front facing the road are three round-arched cast iron casement windows. The right gable end contains a round-arched doorway with a fanlight.	II
Rockhall Cottage; 53.15681°N 1.99247°W		Early 19th century	A cottage orné in the style of a mock castle, it is in stone with an embattled parapet and a tile roof. There are two storeys, four bays, and an extension to the right. The third bay is a three-sided stair turret, and it contains slit windows. In the other bays are casement windows with pointed heads, those in the upper floor with gablets above.	II
Roachside Farmhouse; 53.16178°N 2.00974°W	—	Early to mid 19th century	The farmhouse is in sandstone with rusticated quoins, a string course, dentilled eaves, and a tile roof with verge parapets. There are two storeys and an attic, and a symmetrical front of three bays. The central doorway has a fanlight, and a fluted cornice hood on scroll brackets. The windows are sashes with rusticated surrounds and voussoirs.	II
Barn northwest of Roachside Farmhouse and paved farmyard 53.16196°N 2.00986°W	—	Early to mid 19th century	The barn is in stone and has a tile roof with verge parapets. There are two levels, consisting of a hay loft over a byre, stables and coach house, and an L-shaped plan. The barn contains a segmental-headed coach entry, windows, a stable door and pitching holes, and in the angle are external steps leading to a hay loft door. The barn is in a farmyard paved with massive roughly-squared sandstone flags.	II
Condlyff Memorial; 53.14460°N 2.01796°W		c. 1861–67	The memorial is in the churchyard of St Matthew's Church, and it to the memory of members of the Condlyff family. It is in stone and is a pedestal tomb in Greek Revival style. The tomb has a square plan, a double plinth, a moulded and dentilled cornice, and a draped urn.	II
St Matthew's Church; 53.14466°N 2.01778°W		1868	The church was designed by Richard Norman Shaw, and the chancel was added in 1873. It is built in stone with a tile roof, and consists of a nave, a south porch, a central tower, and a chancel. The tower has three stages, buttresses, and a pyramidal roof.	II*
Telephone kiosk 53.14406°N 2.01707°W	—	1935	A K6 type telephone kiosk, designed by Giles Gilbert Scott. Constructed in cast iron with a square plan and a dome, it has three unperforated crowns in the top panels.	II
