= Brankley Pastures =

Nature reserve in Staffordshire, England

- Location within Staffordshire
- Location: near Barton-under-Needwood, Staffordshire
- OS grid: SK 166 212
- Coordinates: 52°47′16.8″N 1°45′15.34″W
- Operator: Staffordshire Wildlife Trust
- Website: www.staffs-wildlife.org.uk/nature-reserves/brankley-pastures

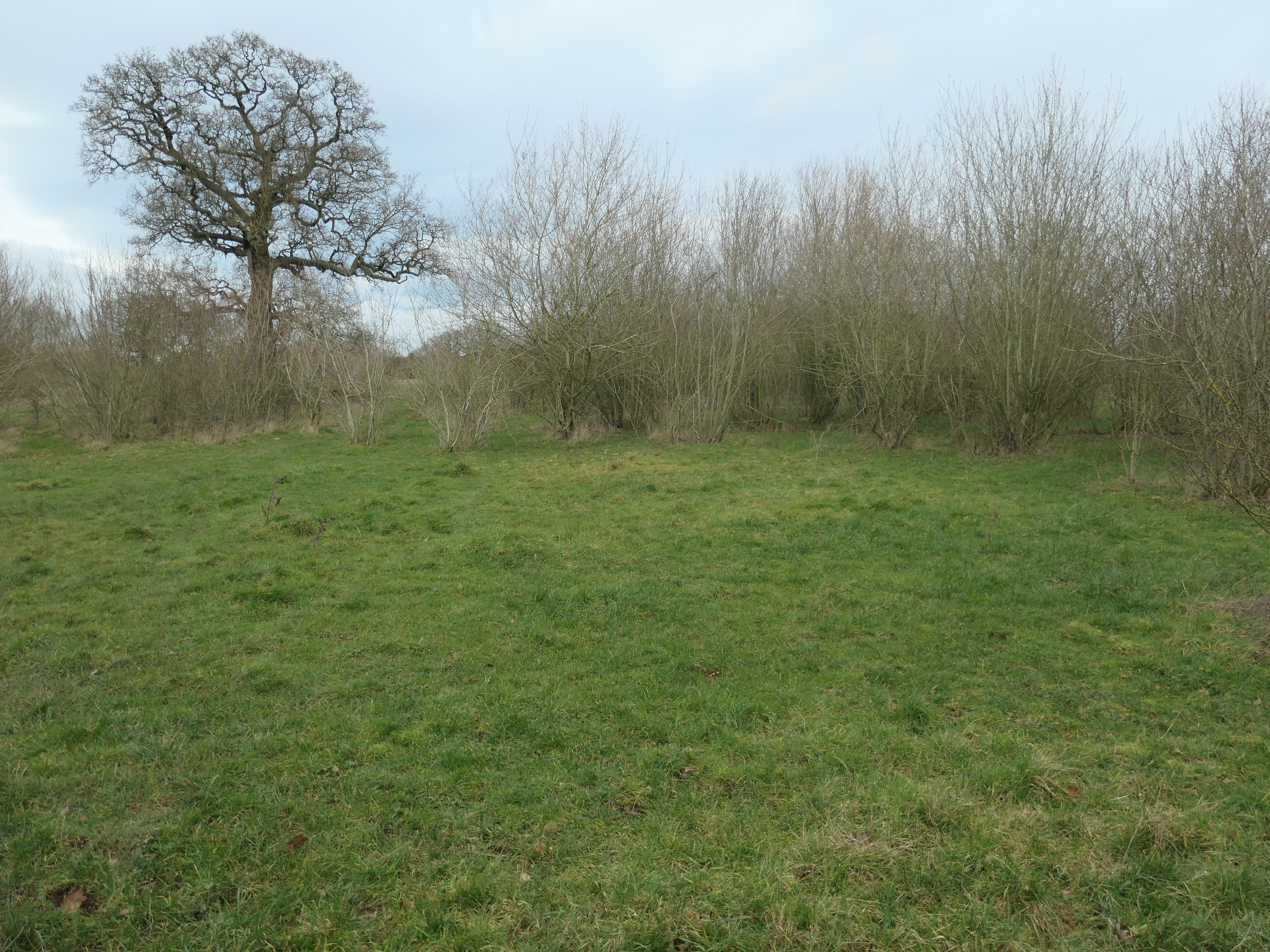
New wood pasture, Brankley Pastures

Brankley Pastures is a nature reserve of the Staffordshire Wildlife Trust. It is about 2.5 miles (4.0 km) miles north-west of Barton-under-Needwood, in Staffordshire, England.

== Description ==
The area is part of Needwood Forest, which, around 1700, comprising seven estate, was an area of over 9,000 acres (3,600 ha) of wood pasture, a mixture of grassland and woodland. In the enclosures of the 1800s, trees were cleared in Needwood Forest as the land was converted to agricultural use.

There is a circular walk through the reserve. The trail includes Oakwood Pasture, an ancient woodland where the original wood pasture has survived. There is a long-term project — it will take hundreds of years — to recreate this landscape in the rest of the reserve. Acorns and other tree seeds are scattered, and cattle are introduced, enough to manage the grassland but few enough to leave the new trees unaffected by browsing.
