= Allimore Green =

Hamlet in Staffordshire, England

Coordinates: 52.770°N 02.217°W

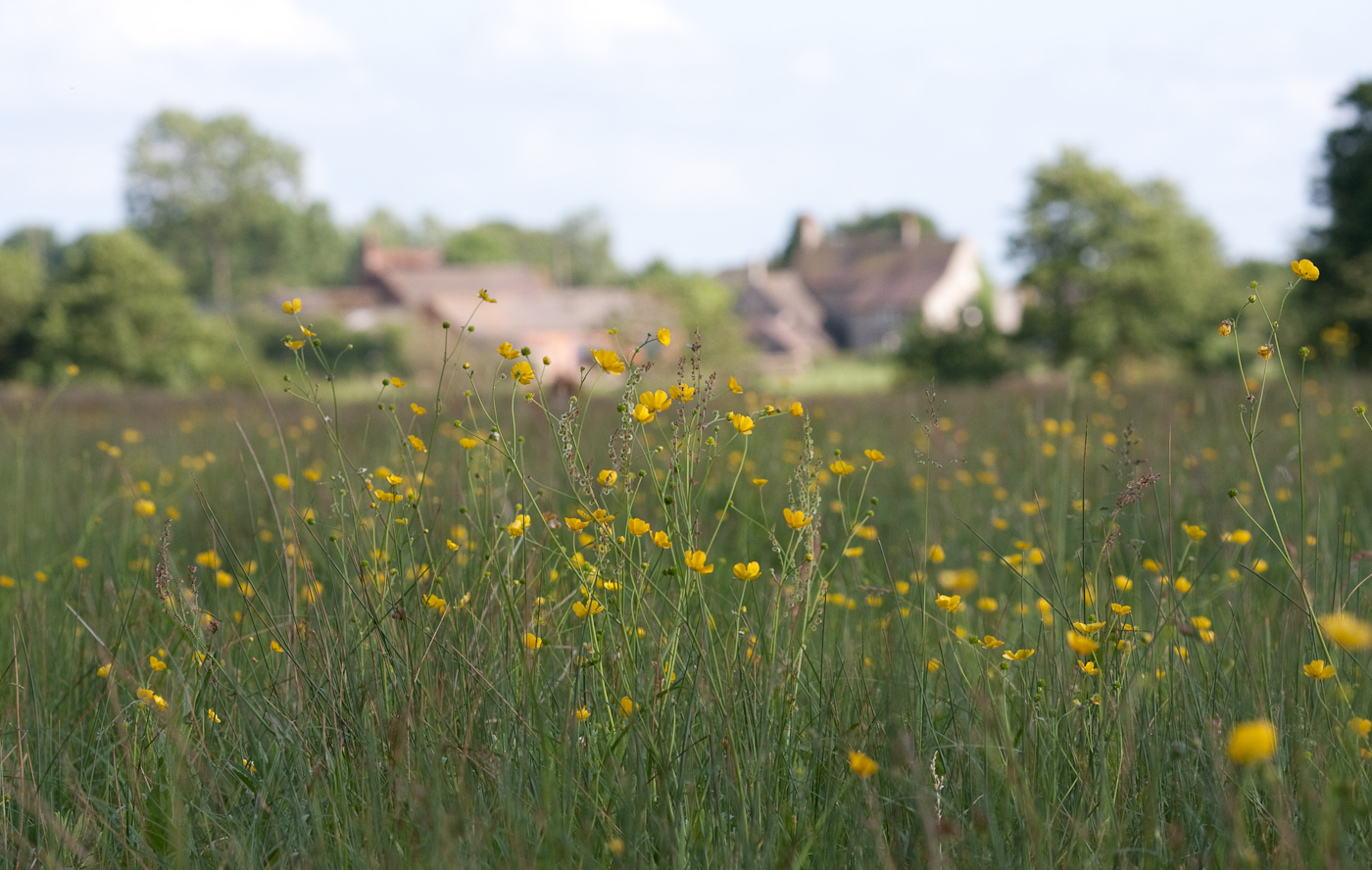
- Meadows at Allimore Green

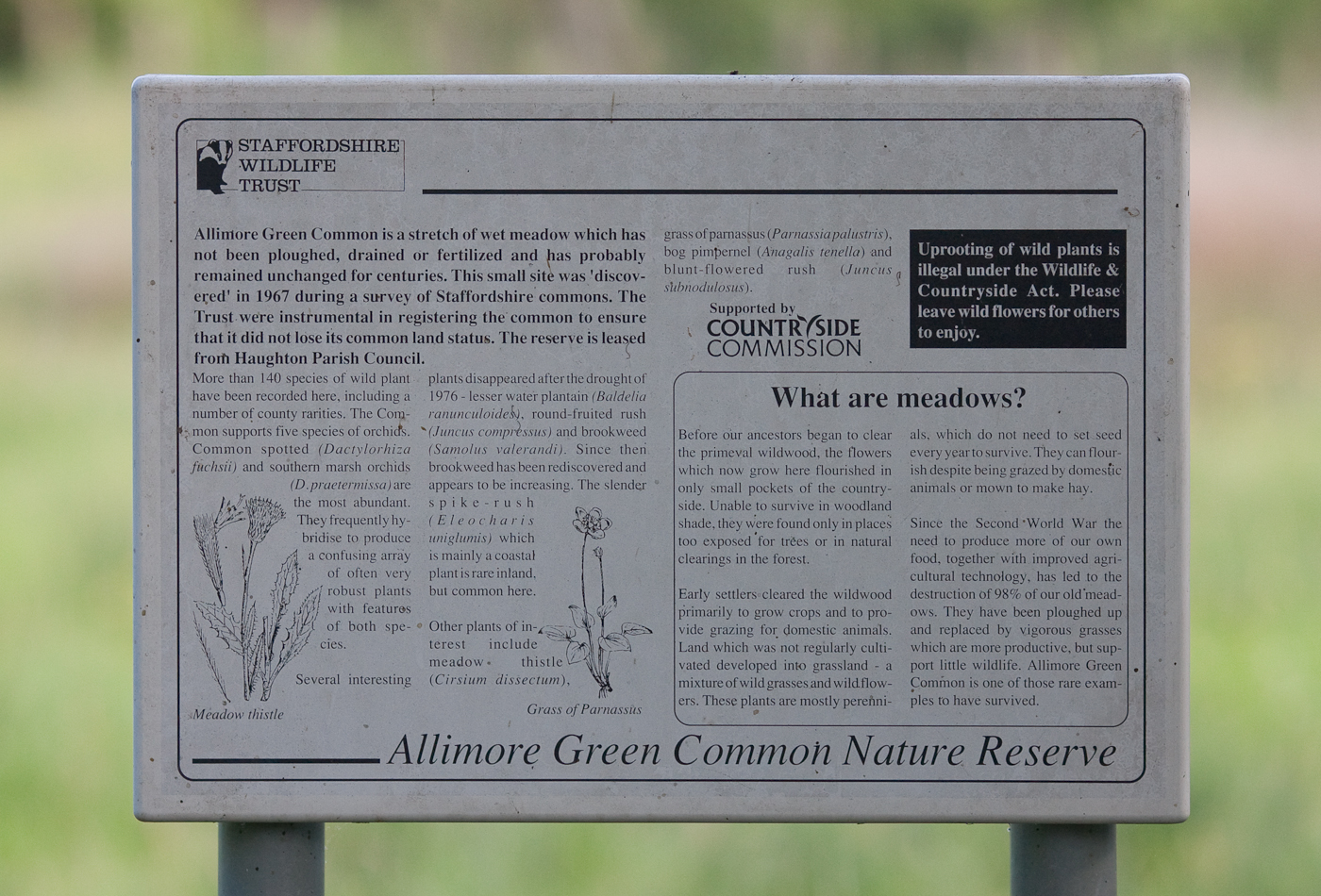
- Notice board at the Allimore Green SSSI

- Location within Staffordshire
- OS grid reference: SJ8519
- Shire county: Staffordshire
- Region: West Midlands
- Country: England
- Sovereign state: United Kingdom
- Police: Staffordshire
- Fire: Staffordshire
- Ambulance: West Midlands

Allimore Green is a small hamlet in Staffordshire, England, 1 mile (1.6 km) north-east of Church Eaton.

It is the location of a Site of Special Scientific Interest, a Common of Wetland Meadow, in the care of the Staffordshire Wildlife Trust. The site supports more than 140 species of vascular plants including 5 orchids, two of which are found nowhere else in Staffordshire. The Staffordshire Wildlife Trust describe the varied history of the site:

As a parish common, the site experienced a chequered history of management with local parishioners grazing their livestock and cutting hay, and reports of gypsies regularly using the Common for their horses and coppicing the alder trees. There have also been attempts to drain the site by excavating ditches on three sides of the Common and a central ditch through the southern half of the pasture. Fortunately these attempts have not been successful - the Common still has poor drainage with the ironic added benefit of several areas of open water habitat.

Somewhat appropriately, the name Allimore means 'the path through the marsh'.
