= Hem Heath =

District of Stoke-on-Trent, England

Coordinates: 52.96°N 02.18°W

- Location within Staffordshire
- OS grid reference: SJ8841
- District: Stoke-on-Trent
- Shire county: Staffordshire
- Region: West Midlands
- Country: England
- Sovereign state: United Kingdom
- Post town: Stoke-on-Trent
- Postcode district: ST4
- Dialling code: 01782
- Police: Staffordshire
- Fire: Staffordshire
- Ambulance: West Midlands
- UK Parliament: Stoke-on-Trent

Hem Heath is a district of Stoke-on-Trent in Staffordshire, England. It is just south of the Bet365 Stadium, which was built on the former Hem Heath Colliery.

The nature reserve Hem Heath Woods is nearby.

The land is also home to several newly built housing estates, as well as multiple industrial units for companies such as Amazon and EON.

Smaller retailers also maintain sites such as Greene King's Hem Heath Pub, Aldi, and Wingers fast food

== History ==
Hem Heath is believed to have first been referenced in the early 1600's under the name Brend (or Burnt) Heath and Whrethornes (or Horthornes) and was used to pasture sheep and other cattle due to its covering in Furze and Gorse.

The land was believed to have been part of the Trentham Estate, owned by the Leveson-Gower Family since 1540.

Hem Heath was then recorded on The Yates map of 1775, where the land that now makes up Hem Heath Woods being marked as being a park. with a turnpike being created in 1771, linking Trentham and Longton.

In 1847, the land was split in half with the construction of the North Staffordshire Railway, with the land being assigned to the Trentham estate.

In 1924, the Staffordshire Coal and Iron Company purchased the land north of the woods and founded the Hem Heath colliery. Privately owned until the national coal board came into ownership of the land and mine as part of nationalisation in 1947.

After the closure of the Colliery in 1997, the land was then acquired by Staffordshire wildlife trust and now maintain Hem Heath Woods.
