= Jackson's Coppice and Marsh =

- Location within Staffordshire
- Location: near Eccleshall, Staffordshire
- OS grid: SJ 788 298
- Coordinates: 52°51′55″N 2°18′59″W
- Area: 16 hectares (40 acres)
- Operator: Staffordshire Wildlife Trust
- Website: www.staffs-wildlife.org.uk/nature-reserves/jacksons-coppice-marsh

Jackson's Coppice and Marsh is a nature reserve of the Staffordshire Wildlife Trust. It is along the River Sow, near the village of Bishop's Offley and about 2.5 miles (4.0 km) west of Eccleshall, in Staffordshire, England.

== Description ==
The reserve, area 8 hectares (20 acres), is leased from the Sugnall Estate. It lies along the River Sow; Offleybrook Mill is upstream and Walk Mill is downstream. In the 13th century, a dam at Walk Mill raised the water level of the marsh, and until the 1950s the fields were managed as water-meadows. After the 1970s, when Walk Mill fell into disuse, the mill pond became silted up; the pond has since been restored.

=== Marsh ===
There is a boardwalk leading through an alder carr, a wet woodland of alder. The River Sow is split here into a number of narrow channels. It is a habitat for particular species of plant and insects; dragonflies and damselflies may be seen.

=== Jackson's Coppice ===
The wood, which has been coppiced in the past, has been long established, originally with oak, rowan and hazel. It is thought that the sweet chestnut, beech and hornbeam were planted in the late 19th century. The coppice has a notable display of blubells in the spring. The sandy soil has encouraged a large badger sett. Several species of woodland birds may be seen, such as nuthatch, treecreeper and great spotted woodpecker.

== Increase in size of the reserve ==
In 2026, as a result of a gift left in a will, the Trust purchased an area of wet woodland and marsh, part of the floodplain of the River Sow; this has doubled the area of the reserve to 16 hectares (40 acres). Plans for the additional area include coppicing mature alder trees to allow more light, since the land is very wet, and managing the growth of willows. In the long term, the habitat will be improved for relevant species of butterflies and birds, by introducing flowers and patches of scrub.
