= Harston Wood =

Nature reserve in Staffordshire, England

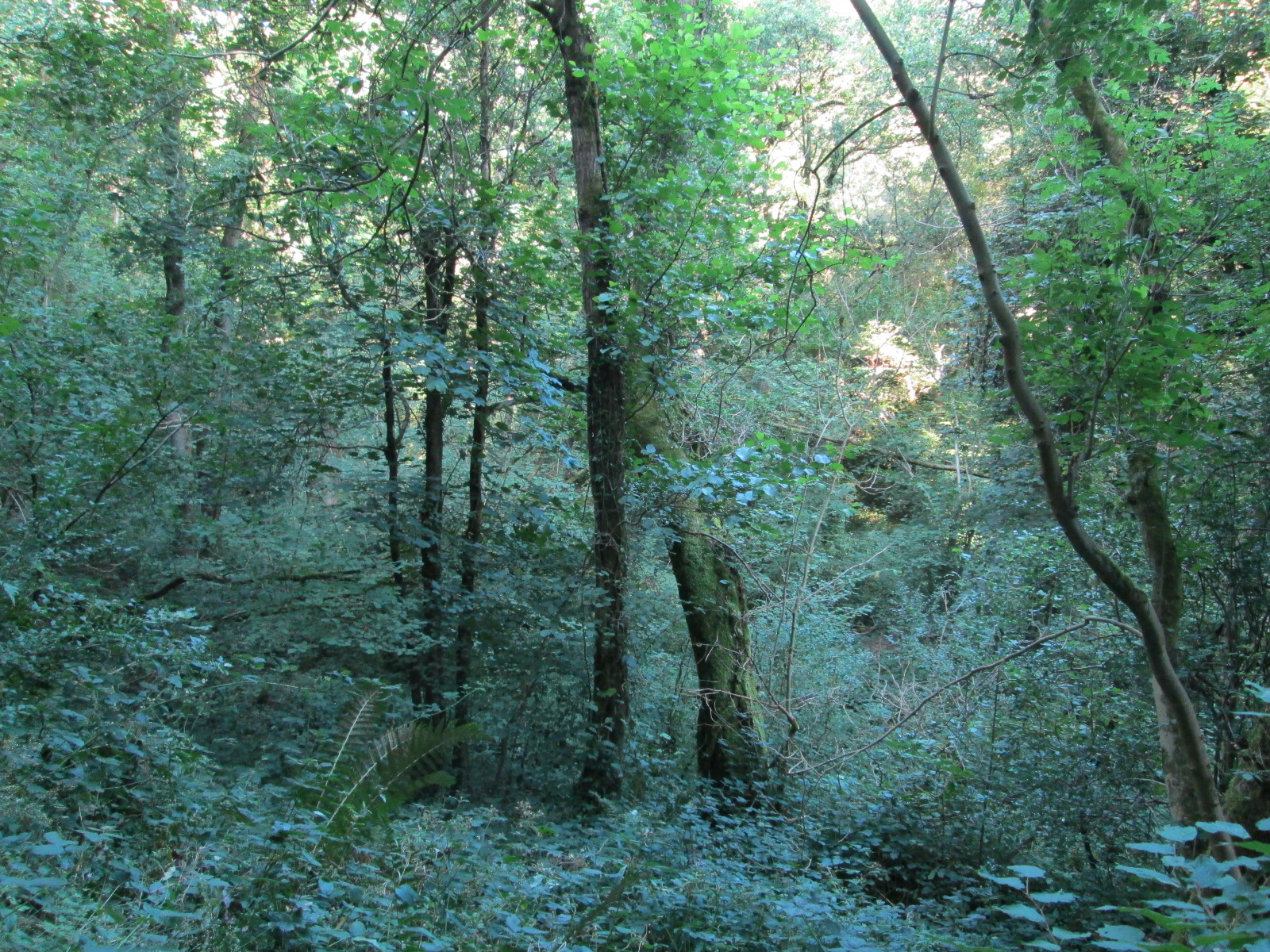
- Looking downhill towards Shirley Brook

- Location within Staffordshire
- Location: Froghall, near Cheadle, Staffordshire
- OS grid: SK 034 479
- Coordinates: 53°1′42″N 1°57′3″W
- Area: 3 hectares (7.4 acres)
- Operator: Staffordshire Wildlife Trust
- Website: www.staffs-wildlife.org.uk/nature-reserves/harston-wood

Harston Wood is a nature reserve of the Staffordshire Wildlife Trust. It is an ancient woodland, adjacent to the village of Froghall, near Cheadle, Staffordshire, England.

== Description ==
The wood was established as a nature reserve in 1983, in agreement with the owner, Mrs G. Hayes. Its area is 3 hectares (7.4 acres) and it is part of the Churnet Valley Site of Special Scientific Interest.

It is nearly a mile long, on a steep valley side between Shirley Brook (a tributary of the River Churnet) to the north, and the route of a former tramway, now a footpath, from where the entire length of the reserve can be seen. The tramway once carried limestone from quarries about 3 miles (4.8 km) to the east at Caldon Low near Cauldon, to the Caldon Canal at Froghall Wharf.

Existing for over 400 years, the wood is ancient woodland. It was once coppiced to supply timber for charcoal making. There are mostly ash trees; other species include hazel and oak; also small-leaved lime, which, seldom producing viable seeds in Britain, is only found in long-established woods. In waterlogged places there are areas of alder carr.

The wood is a habitat for woodpeckers, nuthatches and treecreepers. On the ground of the woodland there is wild garlic, yellow archangel and wood-sorrel. Twayblade and broadleaved helleborine can be seen next to the tramway.
