= Hem Heath Woods =

Nature reserve in Staffordshire, England

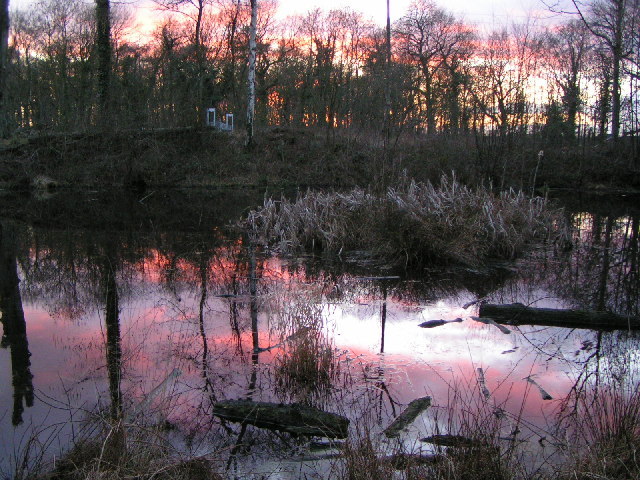
- Sunset at the reserve

- Location within Staffordshire
- Location: Hem Heath ST4 8FR
- OS grid: SJ 888 405
- Coordinates: 52.9622°N 2.1698°W
- Area: 41 hectares (100 acres)
- Operator: Staffordshire Wildlife Trust
- Website: Hem Heath Woods

Hem Heath Woods is a nature reserve of the Staffordshire Wildlife Trust.

It is on the southern fringe of Stoke-on-Trent, England. Its northern boundary is at the A5035 road at Hem Heath; the southern boundary is adjacent to the Wedgwood visitor centre at Barlaston.

== Description ==
The area of the reserve is 41 hectares (100 acres). There are four woods: the Oaks, at the southern end, is known to have been woodland for over 400 years; Newstead Woods, Newpark Plantation and Hem Heath were planted, on former farmland, in the mid-1800s. Although parts of the site may once have been heathland, there is no heath today. There is a network of walking trails in the woods.

The woodland is managed so that it can regenerate naturally, and remain as woodland in the long term. Individual trees or small groups of trees may be felled so that a more open canopy will let seedlings establish themselves. The management of the wood is intended to ensure that a range of trees is maintained. The species include oak, ash, cherry, sycamore and beech. An understorey of woody shrubs is encouraged, including hazel, rowan and hawthorn, which provide homes for wildlife.

== Improvements in 2025 ==
It was announced in November 2025 that, thanks to a grant from the Veolia Environmental Trust through the Landfill Communities Fund, improvements would be carried out, including resurfacing of pathways and creating new waymarked trails, and planting of broadleaf trees subsequent to the removal of ash trees due to ash dieback.
