= Chartley Moss =

Protected area in Staffordshire, England

- Site of Special Scientific Interest
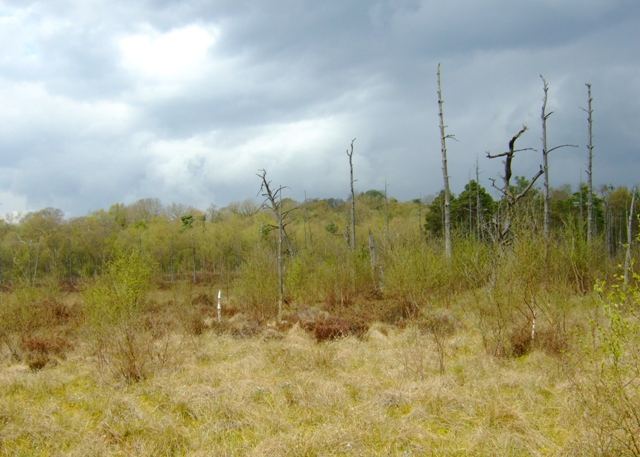

- Location within Staffordshire
- Location of Chartley Moss.
- Area of search: Staffordshire
- Grid reference: SK027283
- Coordinates: 52.851692°N 1.961017°W
- Interest: Biological
- Area: 105.80 hectares (1.0580 km^{2}; 0.4085 sq mi)
- Notification date: 1987

Chartley Moss is a 44 hectare biological Site of Special Scientific Interest in Staffordshire, notified in 1987. The area has been designated as an Area of Outstanding Natural Beauty, a Ramsar Convention protected wetland site, and a national nature reserve. There is no access without a permit.

Chartley Moss was featured in a 1964 BBC programme which included a demonstration of the depth that a rod could be pushed into it, and how the surface of it, and trees growing in it, can move when it is walked on, as it is an example of a quaking bog or schwingmoor.

In 1995 Chartley Moss was twinned with Tsukigaumi Mire, Hokkaido, in a gesture of goodwill between scientists from Hokkaido University and the University of Nottingham.

== See also ==
- List of Sites of Special Scientific Interest in Staffordshire
