= Stanley Gobey =

English cricketer

Stanley Clarke Gobey (18 June 1916 – 20 November 1992) was an English first-class cricketer who played in two matches for Warwickshire in 1946. He was born in Doxey, Staffordshire and died at Harpole, Northamptonshire.

Gobey played in second eleven cricket for Warwickshire in the 1930s as an amateur left-handed middle-order batsman and a right-arm medium pace bowler, but his only first-class cricket came in two matches inside a week in the difficult 1946 season, when Warwickshire lacked players because of slow demobilisation after the Second World War; he was not successful in either game, scoring only two runs in three innings and failing to take a wicket in his two overs of bowling.
