= George's Hayes =

- Location within Staffordshire
- Location: near Longdon, Staffordshire
- OS grid: SK 065 136
- Coordinates: 52°43′11″N 1°54′19″W
- Area: 19 hectares (47 acres)
- Operator: Staffordshire Wildlife Trust
- Website: www.staffs-wildlife.org.uk/nature-reserves/georges-hayes

George's Hayes is a nature reserve of the Staffordshire Wildlife Trust. It is an ancient woodland, about a mile south-west of the village of Longdon, between Rugeley and Lichfield in Staffordshire, England.

It is within the Cannock Chase Area of Outstanding Natural Beauty.

== Description ==
The reserve, total area 19 hectares (47 acres), is leased from the Girl Guide Association. It consists of George's Hayes (the largest part), Piggot's Bottom and Square Covert, all formerly part of the Beaudesert Estate. There are walking trails through the woods. The reserve is in the area of Cannock Chase, and red deer may occasionally be seen.

Existing for over 400 years, the woods are ancient woodland. There was once extensive felling and replanting. Wild flowers to be seen, typical of ancient woodland, include wild garlic, wood anenome, bluebells and a large colony of native wild daffodils.

Although tree species originally in the woods such as oak, ash and hazel still exist, most trees are sycamore. The management of the woods is intended to ensure that there is a diversity of species, and that it can regenerate naturally and remain as woodland in the long term. Individual trees or small groups of trees may be felled so that a more open canopy will let seedlings establish themselves.
