= Radford Meadows =

Nature reserve in Staffordshire, England

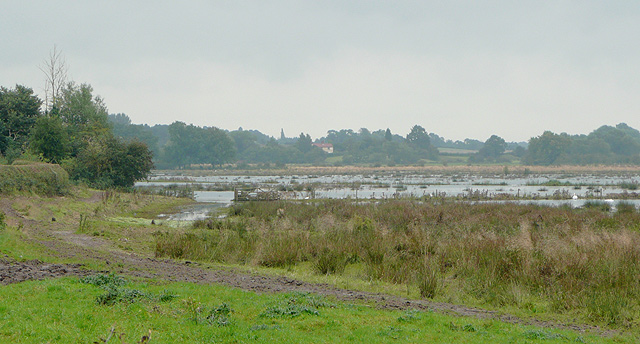
- Viewed from the north

- Location within Staffordshire
- Location: near Stafford, Staffordshire
- OS grid: SJ 938 205
- Coordinates: 52°46′55″N 2°5′36″W
- Area: 56 hectares (140 acres)
- Operator: Staffordshire Wildlife Trust
- Website: www.staffs-wildlife.org.uk/nature-reserves/radford-meadows

Radford Meadows is a nature reserve of the Staffordshire Wildlife Trust, on the southern edge of Stafford, in Staffordshire, England. The reserve is a floodplain situated between the River Penk to the west, and the Staffordshire and Worcestershire Canal.

== Description ==
Access is only along the towpath of the Staffordshire and Worcestershire Canal; the towpath is elevated, and provides views of the entire site.

The area of the reserve is 56 hectares (140 acres). It is part of the floodplain of the River Penk; it is important in absorbing excess water when there is high rainfall.

There are black poplars at the southern end of the reserve. The species is now rare in England, since there is less floodplain woodland. For several centuries, floodplains have been drained to provide more agricultural land.

To retain floodwater at Radford Meadows, dams have been installed. Shallow pools have been created to create conditions suitable for waders and wildfowl. If the right habitat is maintained, birds such as lapwing and snipe may be encouraged to breed on the reserve, as they did up to the 1990s.

== See also ==
- Floodplain restoration
