= Doxey Marshes =

Nature reserve in England

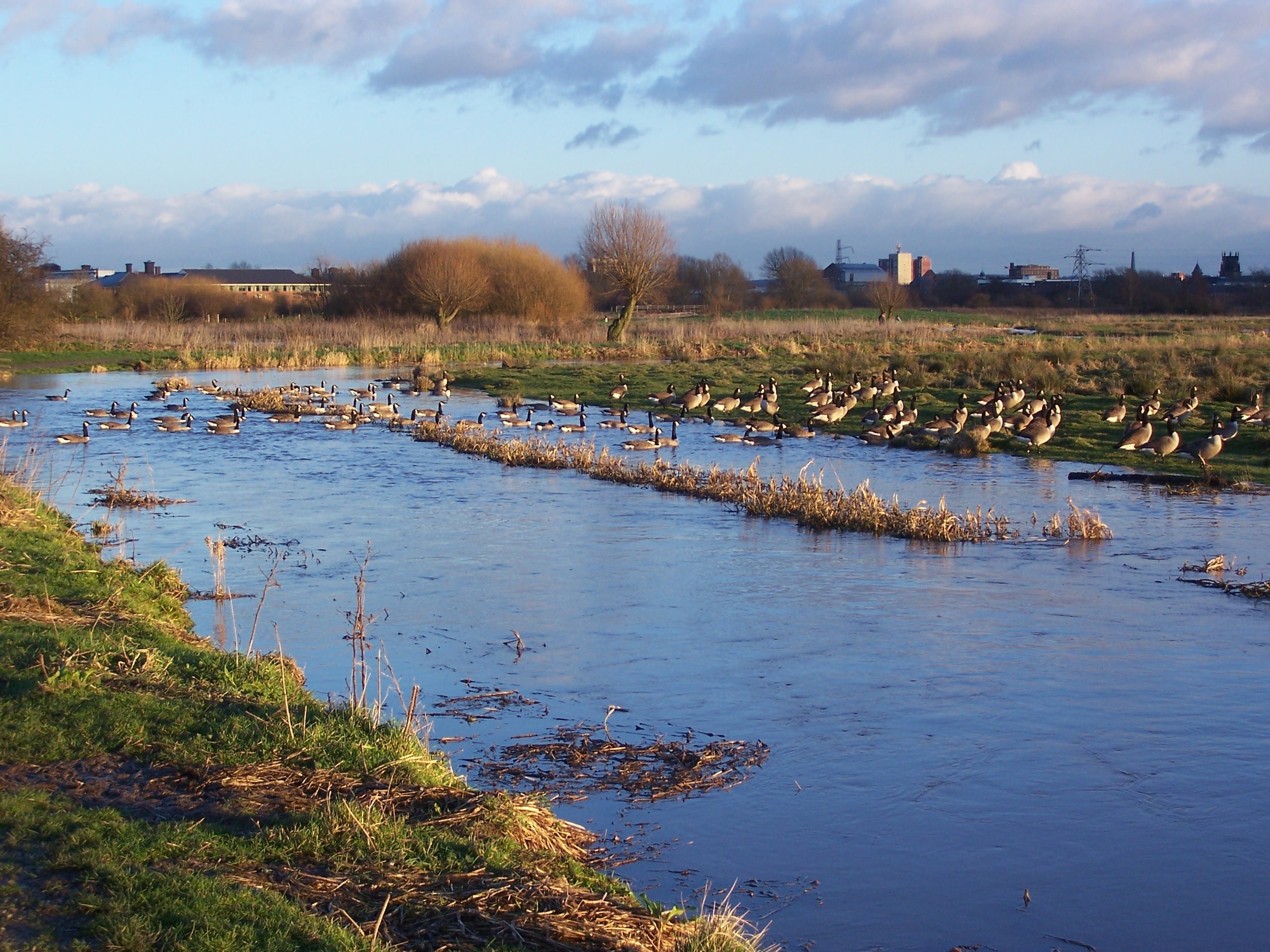
- Doxey Marshes in October 2006
- Interactive map of Doxey Marshes
- Type: Nature reserve
- Location: Stafford, England
- OS grid: SJ903250
- Coordinates: 52.816°N 2.137°W
- Area: 150 hectares (370 acres)
- Operator: Staffordshire Wildlife Trust
- Status: Site of Special Scientific Interest
- Website: www.staffs-wildlife.org.uk/reserves/doxey-marshes

Doxey Marshes is a 150 hectares (370 acres) nature reserve located within two miles of Stafford town centre, and is managed by Staffordshire Wildlife Trust. Designated as a Site of Special Scientific Interest for its wet grassland habitat and its breeding wading birds and wildfowl, it is particularly noted for its populations of breeding snipe. The habitat is one of the most threatened nationally, along with related wildlife such as snipe, lapwing, little ringed plover, otter and water shrew.

== Geographical features and biodiversity ==
Doxey Marshes lies within the floodplain of the River Sow and periodically it breaches its banks and subjects the marshes to flooding. Wading birds love the shallow pools and muddy edges this flooding leaves behind as a source of food. In the autumn and spring during the migration period, Doxey can attract a variety of rare birds. Rarities recorded in recent years include river warbler, marsh warbler, purple heron, cattle egret, Eurasian spoonbill, European bee-eater and bluethroat.

== Management ==
Doxey Marshes Nature Reserve is managed by Staffordshire Wildlife Trust.

Grazing throughout the summer is a very traditional way of managing wet grassland and keeps the grass short enough for ground nesting birds to keep a look out for predators. Cattle numbers are monitored to avoid trampling of eggs and nests early on in the breeding season.

Large areas of rush that are unpalatable to cattle are cut by hand in sections to allow open feeding areas and some cover.

Willow trees are pollarded to help them live longer. This is an ancient way of managing willow trees, the branches are cut off above cattle head height and to discourage crows and magpies from perching in the branches and preying on chicks and eggs. The musk beetle lives on the rotting wood inside these old willow pollards, noctule bats live in the holes and cracks in the trunk and otters sometimes lie up in the thick bush of pollarded branches to hide away from people in the daytime.

Fishing permits are available for Doxey Marshes Nature Reserve from the Staffordshire Wildlife Trust.

== Gallery ==
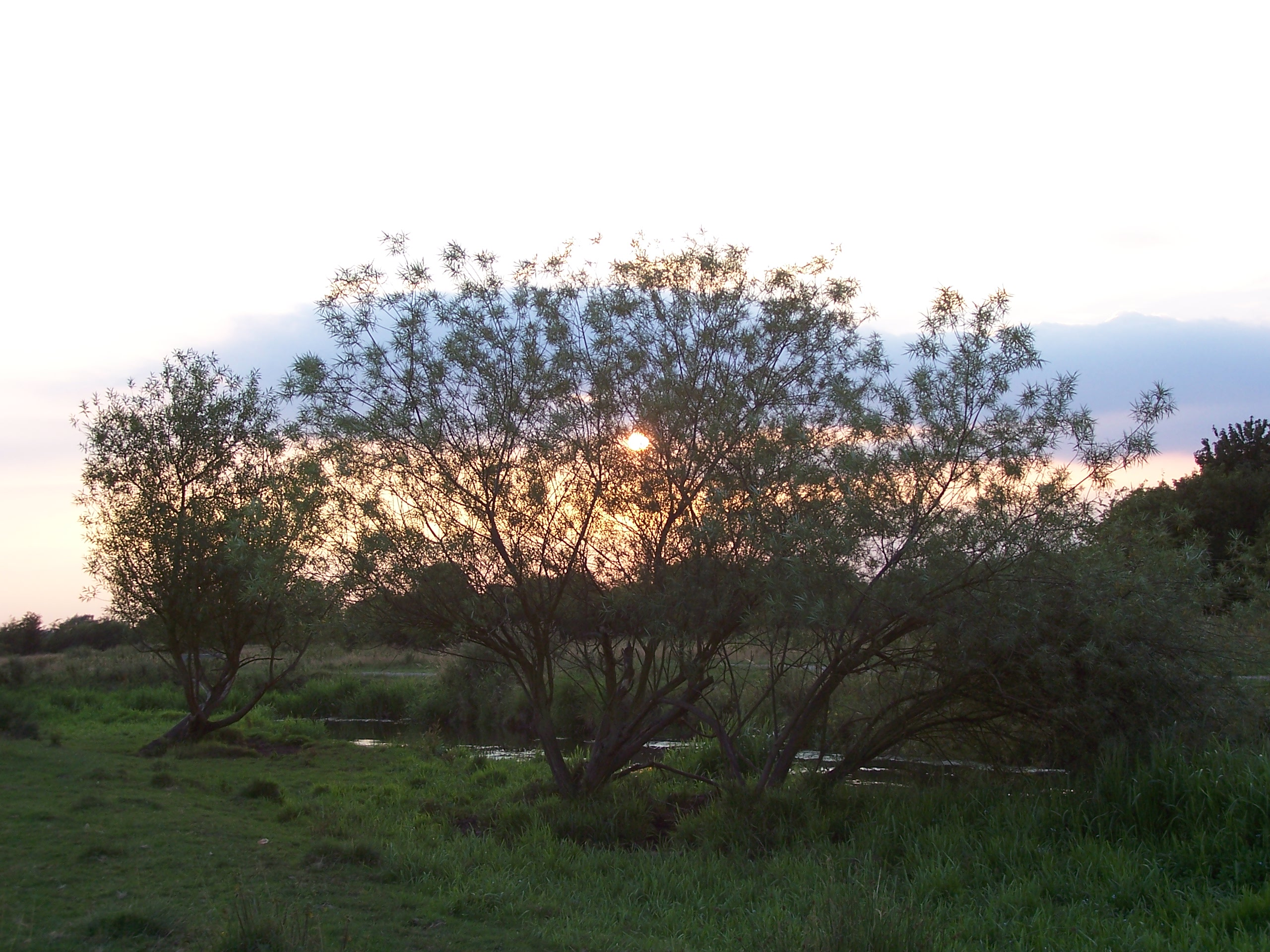

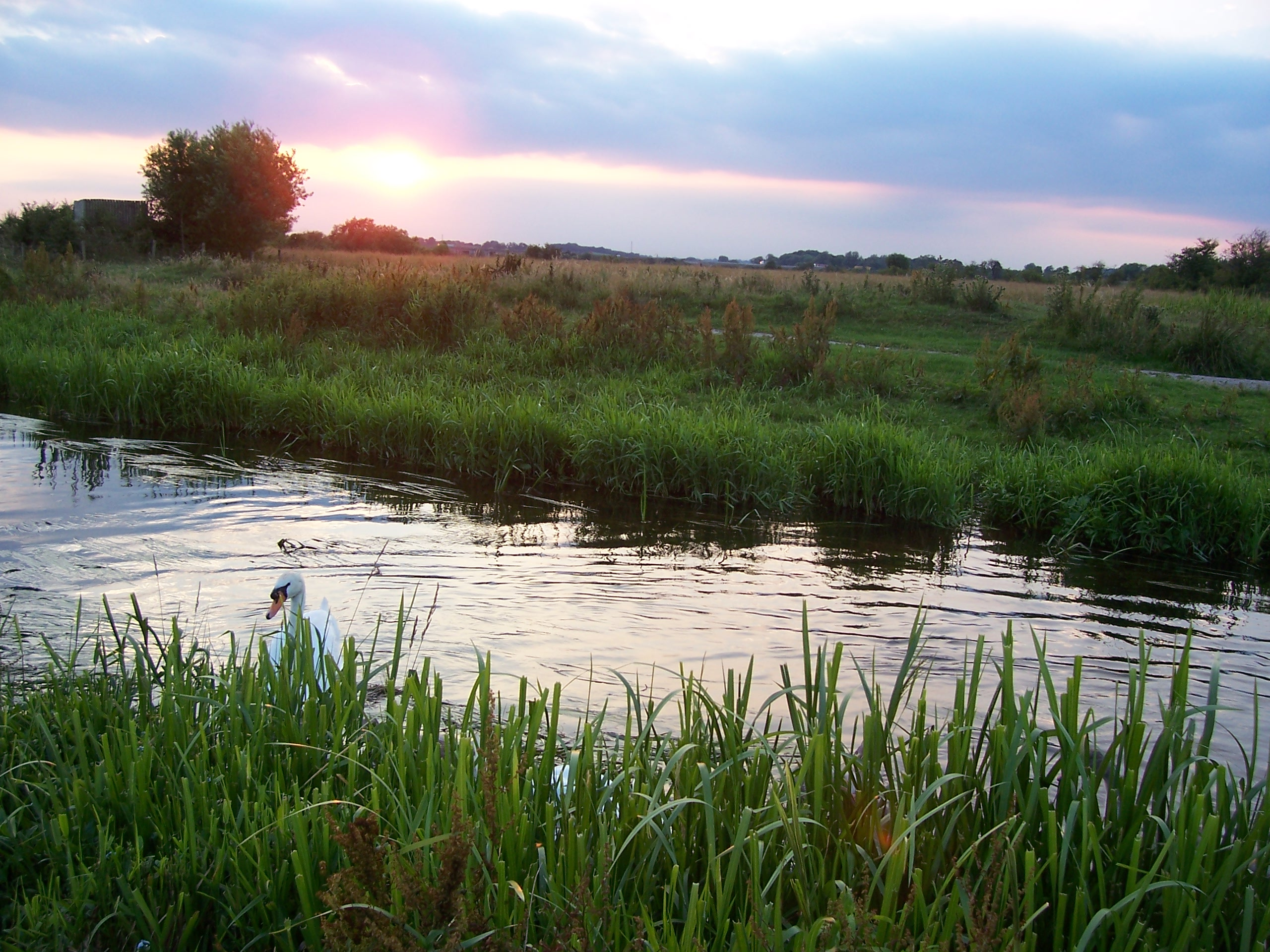

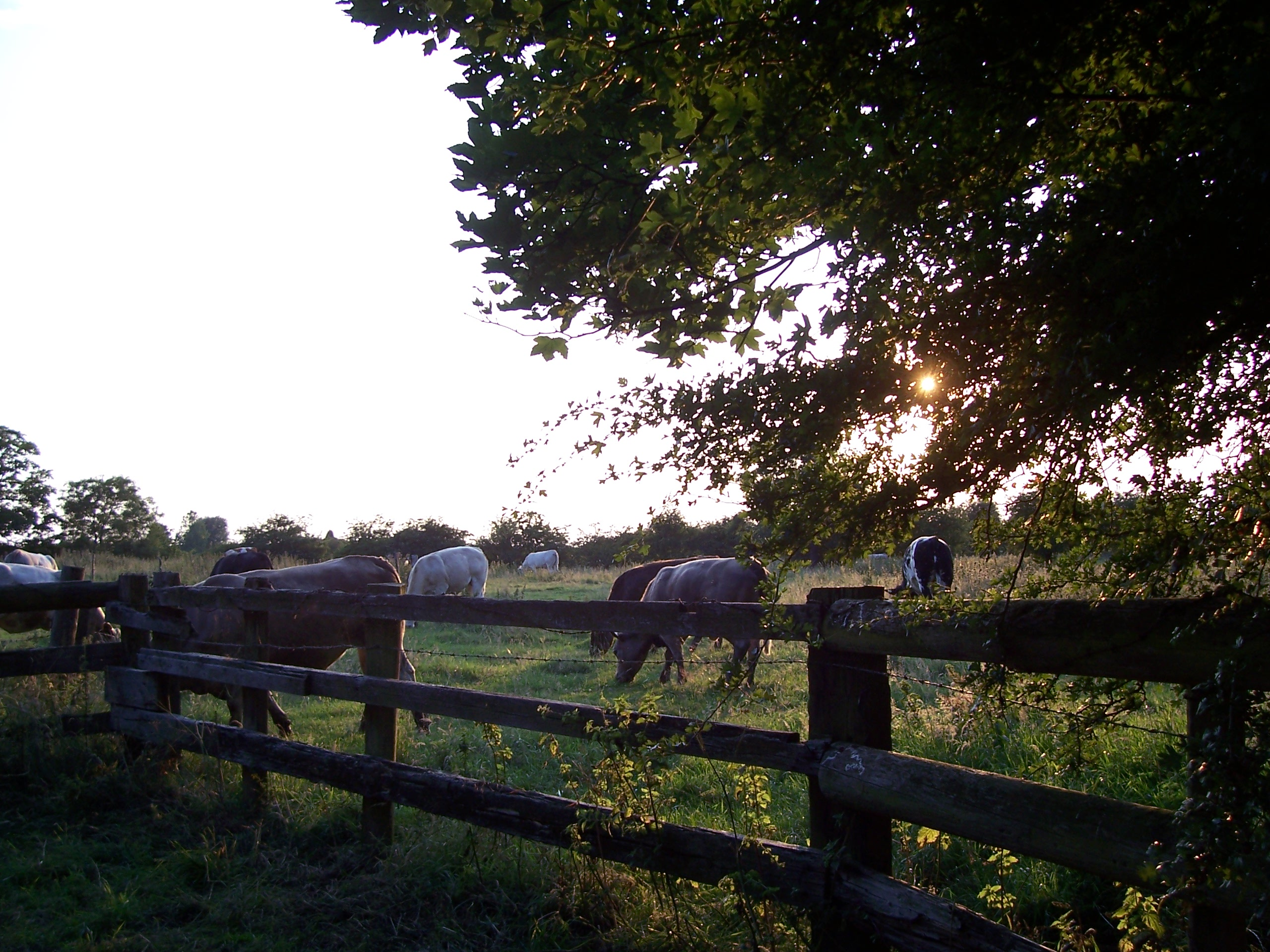

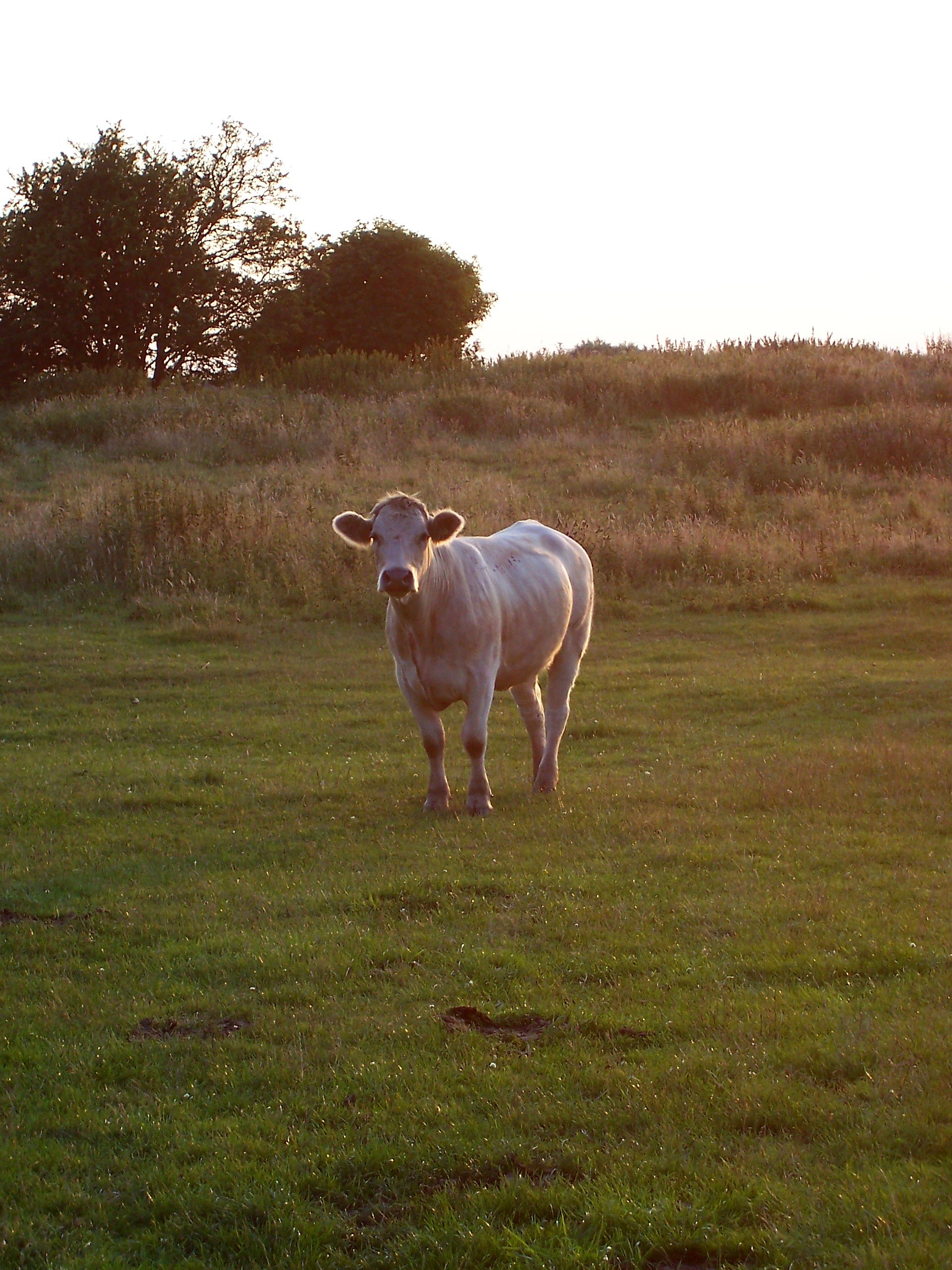

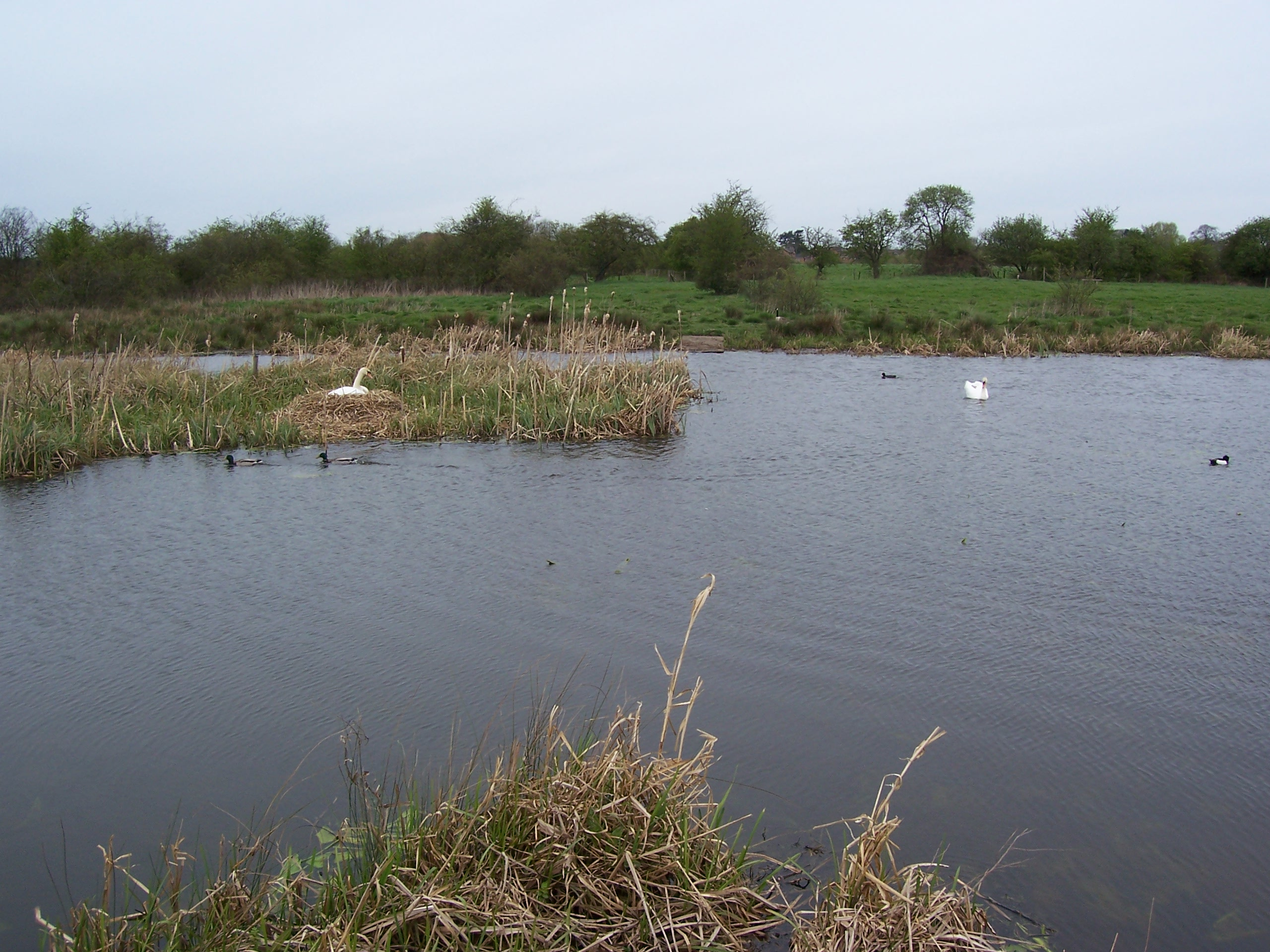

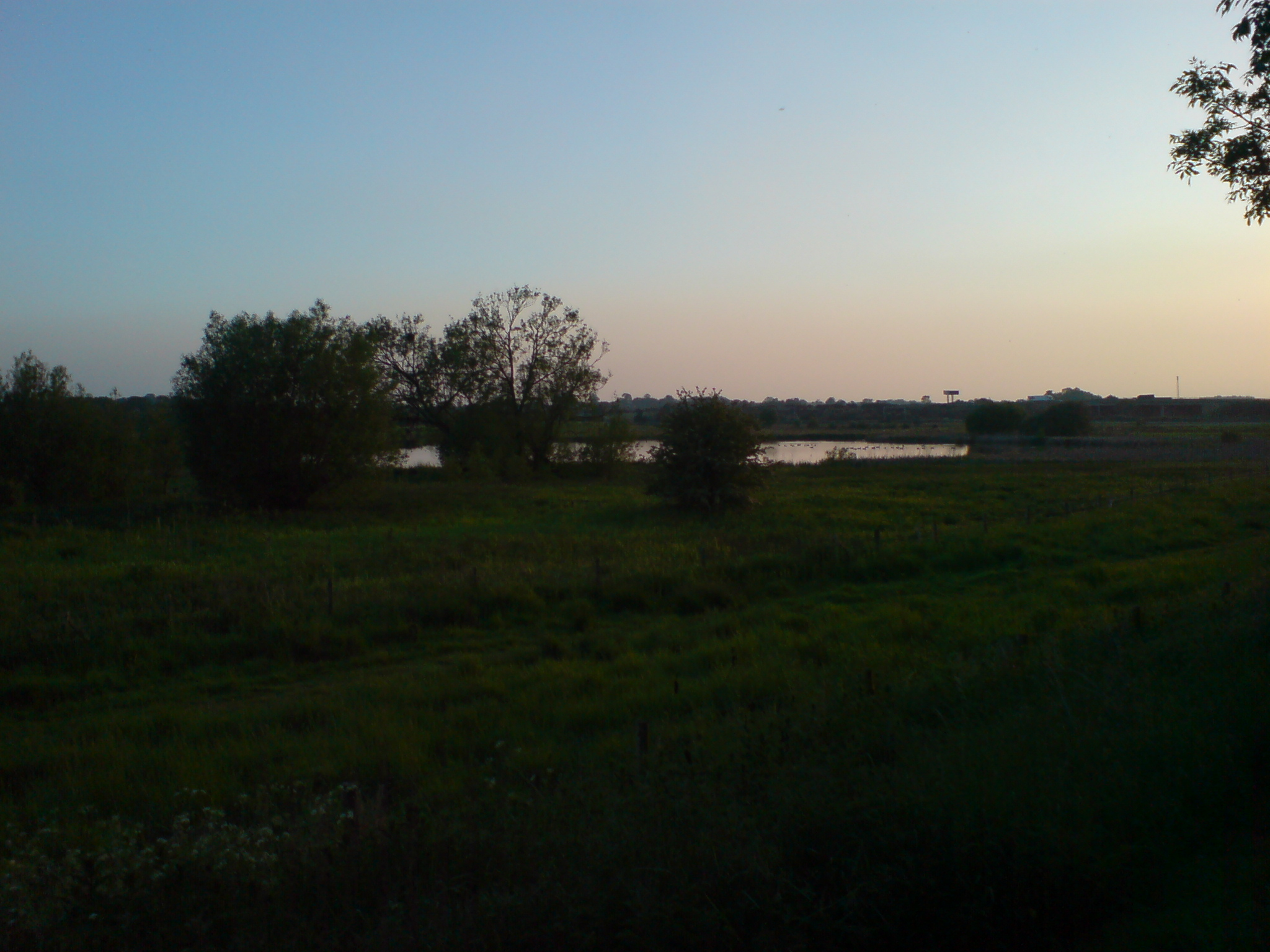
