= Wetley Moor Common =

Heathland in Staffordshire, England

- Site of Special Scientific Interest
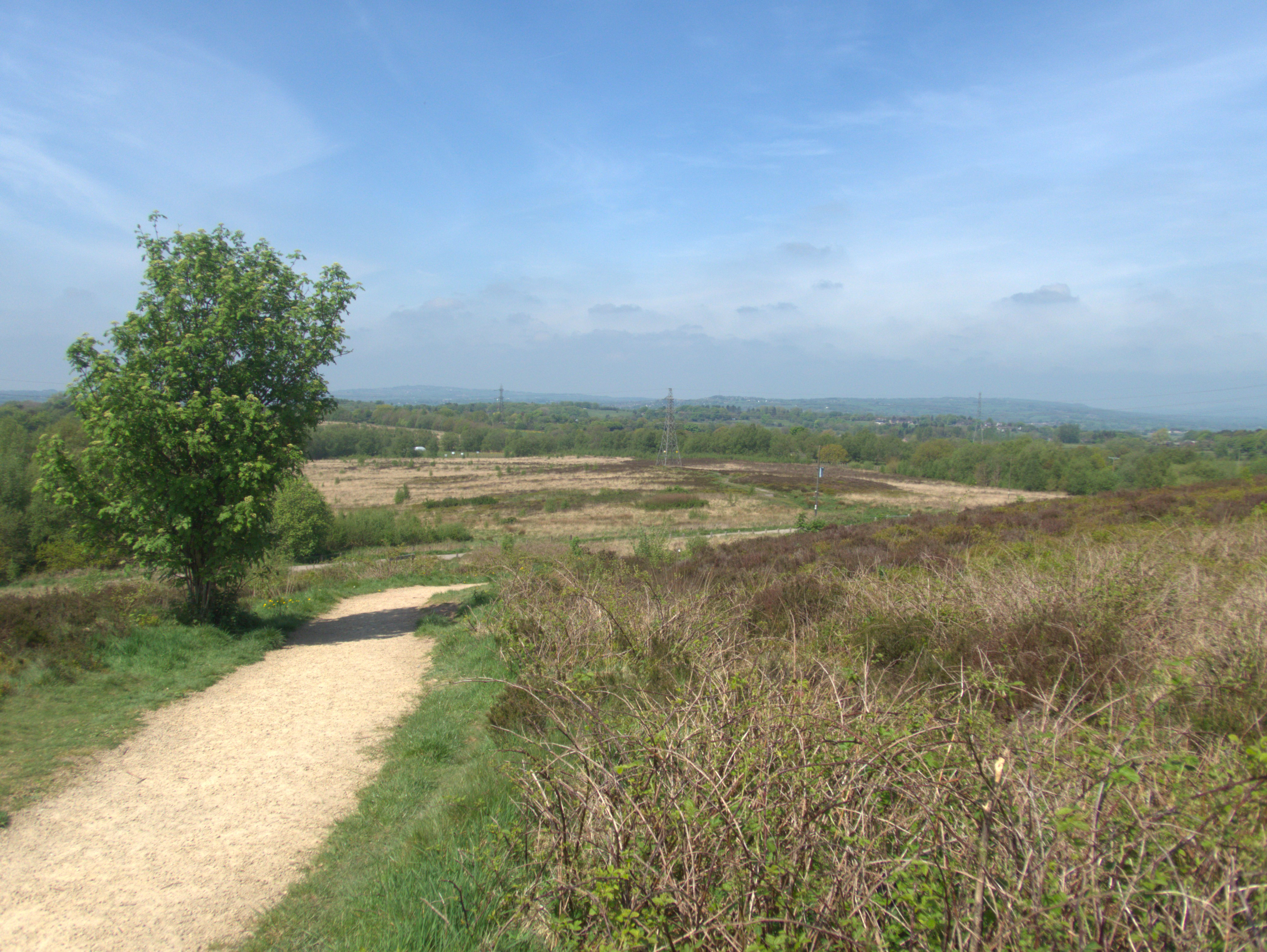

- Location within Staffordshire
- Location of Wetley Moor Common.
- Area of search: Staffordshire
- Coordinates: 53.032°N 2.114°W
- Interest: Heathland and Moorland

Wetley Moor Common is a Staffordshire Wildlife Trust reserve consisting of ancient common land. It has been designated a Site of Special Scientific Interest due to its unimproved lowland heath habitat, which represents approximately 10% of the heathland in Staffordshire. Wetley Moor Common is 118 hectares or 292 acres in size.

== Location ==
Wetley Moor Common is located within Staffordshire, England. It shares a boundary with the Northwest edge of the village of Werrington and is positioned between Werrington and Bagnall. The main access point to the Wetley Moor Common is a carpark entrance on Armshead Road, Werrington (ST9 0EL).

== Management ==
Wetley Moor Common is jointly owned by the Staffordshire Moorlands District Council and Stoke-on-Trent City Council, however it is managed by the Staffordshire Wildlife Trust. Due to Wetley Moor Commons SSSI status the habitat is monitored and managed. Management of the site includes mechanical scrub control and turf stripping. Gorse plants are also coppiced and heather seeds are scattered to bolster the heather population. Specially trained cattle are also utilized to help graze the habitat.

The site is monitored for its effectiveness as a carbon sink. Although in 2023 the habitat was found to be in a degraded state, it was recorded to store nearly 9000 tonnes of carbon which is believed will only improve with effective habitat restoration.

== Wildlife and ecology ==
The grounds of Wetley Moor Common cover 118 hectares, however 70 hectares of that consist of unimproved lowland heath habitat. Around two thirds of Wetley Moor Common spans over coal measures and shale. This results in waterlogged peaty soil, which provides the right conditions for a rare wet heath habitat. On the Eastern side of the moor around one third lies on coarse-grained sandstone. This area consists of sandy free draining soil conditions, which provide conditions for dry heath habitat.

Wetley Moor Common contains plant species such as heather, purple moor grass, gorse, soft rush, bilberry and cotton grass. Sphagnum moss is also present on the site, with Wetley Moor Common being a significant carbon sink, despite the habitats degraded state. Wetley Moor Common also provides a suitable habitat for a variety of bird species including: reed bunting, linnet, meadow pipit, whitethroat and grasshopper warblers. Although a majority of the site consists of heathland, there are also areas of improved grassland and degraded marsh habitat.

== History ==
Wetley Moor is an ancient area of common land, which is believed to have previously covered a much larger area. On the 1775 William Yates map Wetley Moor Common is shown to be much larger than it is now, consisting of around 5000 acres and extending to Bucknall, Caverswall, Cheddleton, Dilhorne and Weston Coyney.
