= Chasewater Heaths =

Protected area in Staffordshire, England

Chasewater and the Southern Staffordshire Coalfield Heaths
- Site of Special Scientific Interest
- Location within Staffordshire
- Location of Chasewater and the Southern Staffordshire Coalfield Heaths.
- Area of search: Staffordshire
- Grid reference: SK035079
- Coordinates: 52.668801°N 1.9496797°W
- Area: 1,310.22 acres (5.302 km^{2}; 2.047 sq mi)
- Notification date: 2010

Chasewater and the Southern Staffordshire Coalfield Heaths is a Site of Special Scientific Interest in Staffordshire, England. It is located between Brownhills and Hednesford. The protected area includes Brownhills Common and the Chasewater Reservoir. It also includes Biddulph's Pool and No Man's Bank.

== Biology ==
Chasewater and the Southern Staffordshire Coalfield Heaths is a protected area because of the vegetation types present: wet heath, dry heath, fens and oligotrophic pools.

Moss species in dry heathland include Sphagnum fallax, Sphagnum palustre, Sphagnum papillosum and Sphagnum capillifolium.

Plant species in the fens include round-leaved sundew and early marsh orchid. A spring has become established in the minerals deposited on the north shore of Chasewater Reservoir that supports a fen with plants including sea club-rush, marsh arrow-grass and the nationally scarce round-leaved wintergreen. Fen plants in this protected area also include tubular water-dropwort.

The sand and gravels around Chasewater Reservoir support plants including floating water-plantain, orange foxtail and golden dock.

The Anglesey Branch canal contains a high diversity of aquatic plants including flat-stalked pondweed, curled pondweed, spiked water-milfoil and amphibious bistort.

== Geology ==
Brownhills Common is composed of a layer of boulder clay overlying Carboniferous Middle Coal Measures.

== Management of the protected area ==
Walsall Council has a role in the management of the protected area. In 2013 it made plans to remove conifer trees from Brownhills Common, as a means to restore heathland. After a public petition in favour of retaining the conifer trees was submitted, the scale of this conifer tree removal was decreased.

== History ==
The historical use of the landscape in which Chasewater and the Southern Staffordshire Coalfield Heaths is located has included coal mining at Cannock Chase Collieries in the Cannock Chase Coalfields and construction of Chasewater reservoir. These landuses allowed plants and animals to recolonise this site and form semi-natural habitats. Lowland heath has developed on land influenced by past coal mining.

== Land ownership ==
Part of the land in this protected area is owned by the Church Commissioners.
