= Castern Wood =

Nature reserve in Staffordshire, England

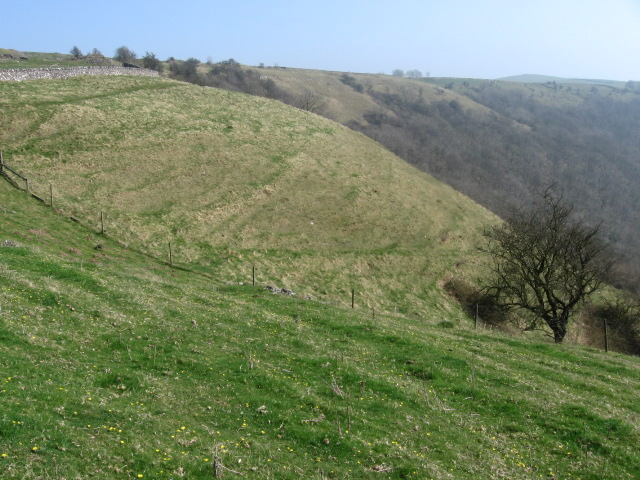
- Hillside of the nature reserve

- Location within Staffordshire
- Interactive map of Castern Wood
- Location: Manifold Valley
- OS grid: SK 118 532
- Coordinates: 53°4′33″N 1°49′31″W
- Area: 21 hectares (52 acres)
- Operator: Staffordshire Wildlife Trust
- Designation: Site of Special Scientific Interest; Special Area of Conservation
- Website: www.staffs-wildlife.org.uk/nature-reserves/castern-wood

Castern Wood is a nature reserve of the Staffordshire Wildlife Trust. It is an ancient woodland, with scrub and grassland, on the eastern slopes of the Manifold Valley, about 1 mile south of Wetton, in Staffordshire, England.

The reserve is designated a Site of Special Scientific Interest and a Special Area of Conservation.

== Description ==
There is a car park a short distance from the reserve at Weags Bridge. The circular walk through Castern Wood is very steep in places.

The area of the reserve is 21 hectares (52 acres). Trees in the ancient woodland include ash, field maple, hazel and oak. There is also scrub and grassland. To prevent the grassland becoming scrub, and the scrub becoming woodland, the site is managed; since cattle grazing is difficult to arrange on this relatively inaccessible site, clearing scrub from grassland is done by volunteers.

Many plant species grow on the limestone soil, including small scabious, ladies mantle, salad burnet and several species of orchid. Woodland plants include dog's mercury and wood avens.
