= Black Firs and Cranberry Bog =

Nature reserve in Staffordshire

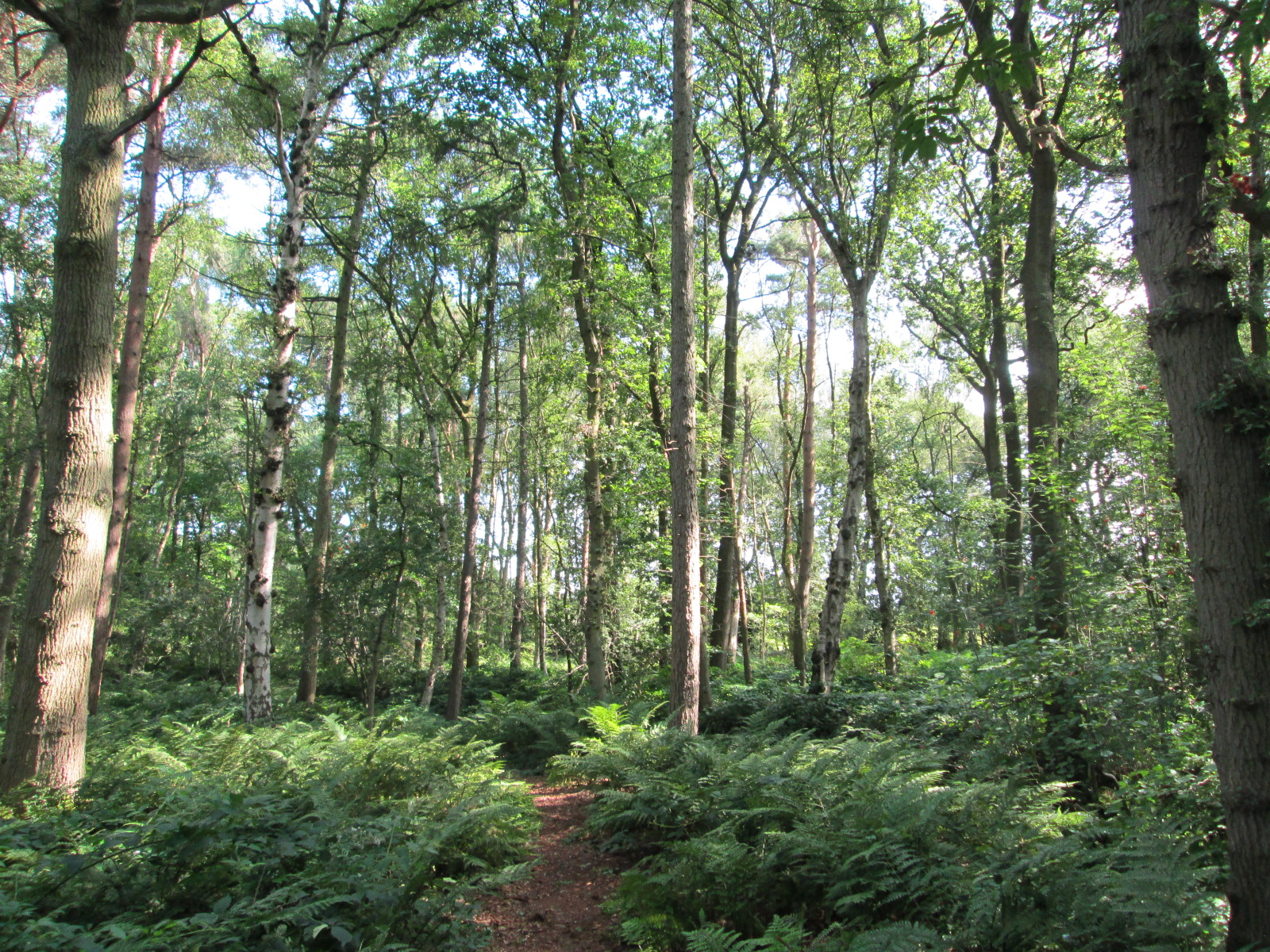
- Black Firs

- Location within Staffordshire
- Interactive map of Black Firs and Cranberry Bog
- Location: near Betley, Staffordshire
- OS grid: SJ 747 501
- Coordinates: 53°2′51″N 2°22′44″W
- Area: 6 hectares (15 acres)
- Operator: Staffordshire Wildlife Trust
- Designation: Site of Special Scientific Interest; Ramsar site
- Website: www.staffs-wildlife.org.uk/nature-reserves/black-firs-cranberry-bog

Black Firs and Cranberry Bog is a nature reserve of the Staffordshire Wildlife Trust, adjacent to Balterley Heath and about 1 mile (1.6 km) north of the village of Betley, in Staffordshire, England.

It is an important peatland site; it is designated a Site of Special Scientific Interest, and a Ramsar site.

== Description ==
The area of the reserve is 6 hectares (15 acres). There is an unmarked footpath in Black Firs. There is no access to Cranberry Bog.

=== Black Firs ===
About 7,000 years ago, the site of Black Firs was a lake about 2 metres deep, left by retreating glaciers of the last ice age. This gradually became vegetated.

By 1800, drainage ditches had been created, in a pattern of concentric rings, and trees had been planted. The area now has mature trees from that period, and naturally occurring trees including alder, oak and birch. In wetter parts there are plants such as yellow iris and royal fern.

=== Cranberry Bog ===
A kettle hole was formed by dead ice left by retreating glaciers of the last ice age, which became a lake when the ice finally melted. A layer of sphagnum moss formed over the lake; this layer still exists. It supports cranberry, and there is also bog asphodel and white beak sedge. Black Mere is the remaining part of the original kettle hole lake.

=== Maintenance ===
Black Firs, which has been drained in the past, continues to dry out, and the hydrological link with Cranberry Bog is not well understood, so that the consequence of any raising of water levels is unclear. The reserve is monitored and plans developed so that the reserve will be protected in the long term.
