= Old River Dove =

UK protected area

- Site of Special Scientific Interest
- Location within Derbyshire
- Location of Old River Dove.
- Area of search: Derbyshire
- Grid reference: SK 237 285
- Coordinates: 52.853479°N 1.6494937°W
- Area: 4.4 acres (0.01781 km^{2}; 0.006875 sq mi)
- Notification date: 1986

Old River Dove is a Site of Special Scientific Interest in Derbyshire, England. It was designated as a protected area in 1986 because of the site's accommodations of dragonflies and also the plant species, Butomus umbellatus.

Part of the land is owned by the Diocese of Derby.
