= Upper Hulme =

Hamlet in Staffordshire, England

Coordinates: 53°08′46″N 1°58′55″W

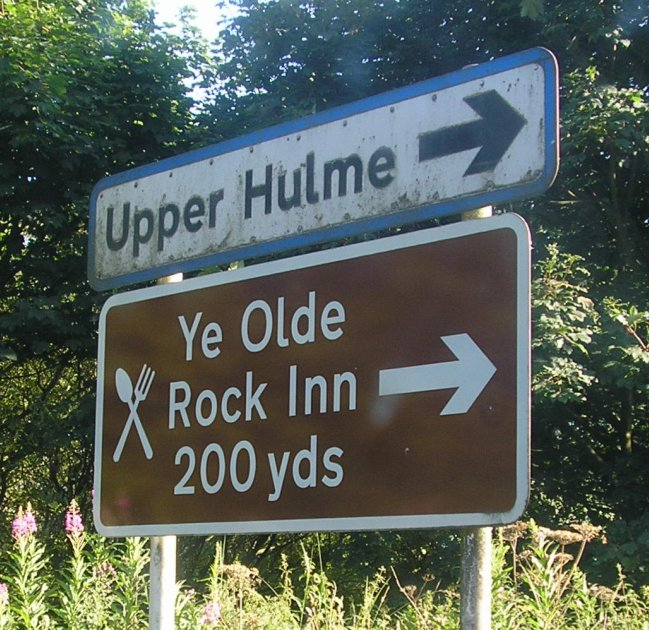
Approaching Upper Hulme

Upper Hulme is a hamlet in North Staffordshire, between the historic market town of Leek and the spa town of Buxton. It is clustered around a redundant mill and is located within the upper reaches of the River Churnet. The Mill was recently restored, with a working water wheel, but no further information on its future is known. It can be accessed by one of the many footpaths through the hamlet. The Peak District Boundary Walk runs through the village.

The hamlet is at the edge of the Peak District near to The Roaches and is therefore very popular with ramblers, climbers and hikers. The A53 road offers access to Tittesworth Reservoir to the south and Ramshaw Rocks to the North, making the hamlet popular for walking holidays. There is a campsite, bunkhouse accommodation, and holiday cottages available.

Upper Hulme is popular with wildlife enthusiasts due to wallabies having been sighted on the Roaches and the successful annual breeding of peregrine falcons. In peregrine breeding season, a 'bird watching post' is set up at the foot of Hen Cloud, and park rangers are on hand to offer advice and information on the bird. At this time of year, some access is restricted.

The hamlet has two local pubs; Ye Olde Rock Inn and The Winking Man. It is also home to popular Tea Rooms. The main industry of the hamlet is agriculture. An old Dye Work has been transformed into offices and workshops near the hamlet's entrance.

The Leek and Upper Hulme Training area (or Upper Hulme Range) is a British Army training area located east of the A53 road.

== See also ==
- Listed buildings in Leekfrith
