= Braken Hurst =

UK protected area

- Site of Special Scientific Interest
- Location within Staffordshire
- Location of Braken Hurst.
- Area of search: Staffordshire
- Grid reference: SK 137222
- Coordinates: 52°47′51″N 1°47′42″W
- Area: 64.0 acres (0.26 km^{2}; 0.10 sq mi)
- Notification date: 1986

Braken Hurst is a Site of Special Scientific Interest in Staffordshire near Hoar Cross village. It is mostly deciduous woodland dominated by Quercus robur and Corylus avellana. The vegetation is thought to represent a fragment of the seventeenth-century landscape of common grazings. Moths recorded at Braken Hurst SSSI include bloomers rivulet (Discoloxia blomeri) and ruddy highflier (Hydriomena ruberata).

Part of the land is owned by the Duchy of Lancaster.
