= Staffordshire Wildlife Trust =

Wildlife trust in Staffordshire, England

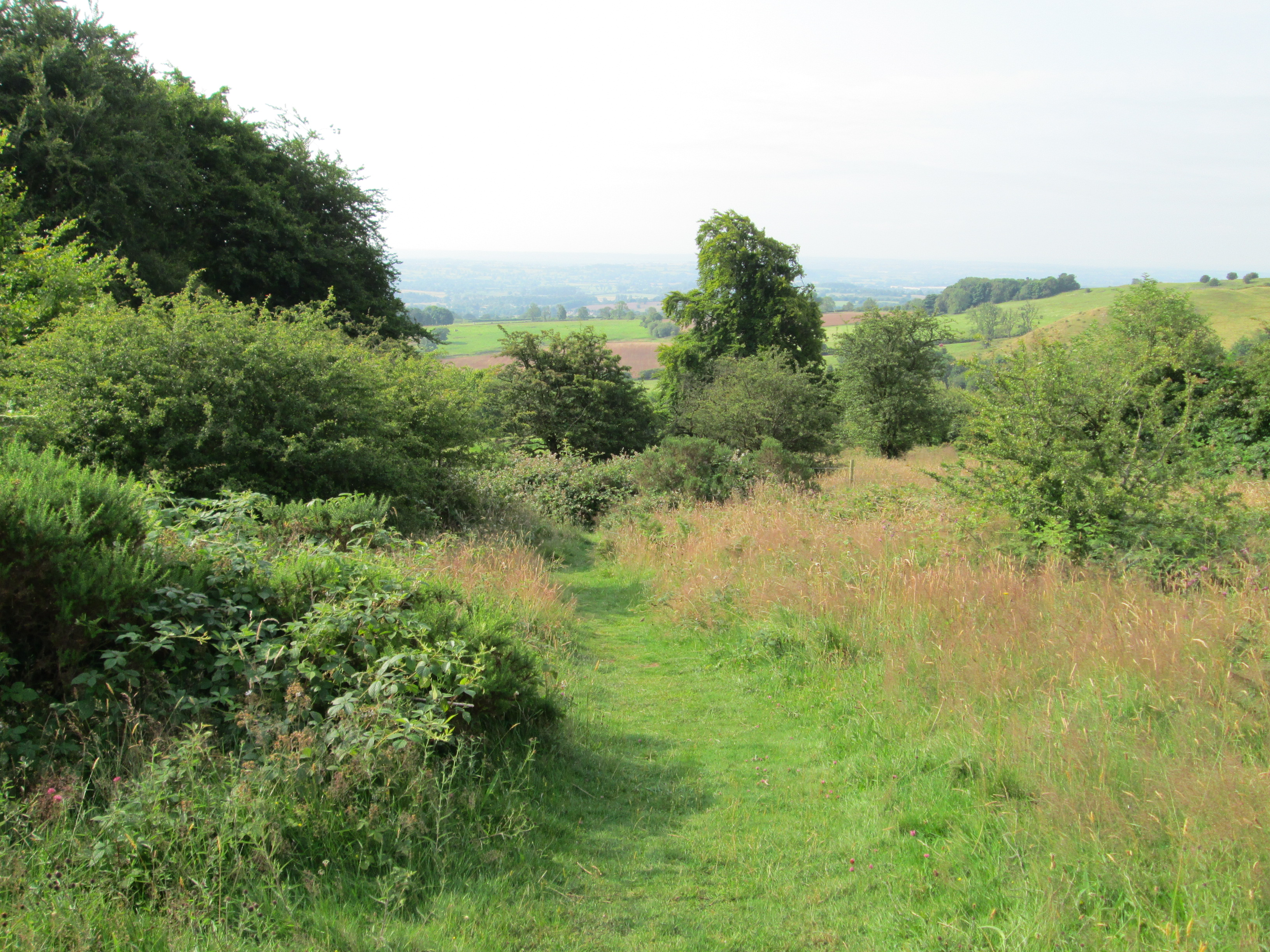
Thorswood, a nature reserve of the Trust

The Staffordshire Wildlife Trust (SWT) is a wildlife trust covering the county of Staffordshire, England.

== Organisation and activities ==
It is one of 46 Wildlife Trusts; each is a registered charity and is a member of the Royal Society of Wildlife Trusts. The Staffordshire Wildlife Trust was founded in 1969. It has about 130 members of staff, overseen by a board of trustees. The Trust is supported by a network of volunteers.

The Trust's visitor centre is the Wolseley Centre, near Rugeley, which is its headquarters.

The Trust manages 43 nature reserves, and carries out conservation projects. It engages with schools regarding environmental education, and works with communities to improve green spaces for wildlife. It offers advice about how to protect and enhance wildlife habitats.

The Trust publishes a regular magazine for members, Wild Staffordshire.

== Nature reserves ==
The Trust looks after these nature reserves:

- Allimore Green
- Biddulph Grange Country Park
- Biddulph Valley Way and Whitemore Nature Reserve
- Black Brook
- Black Firs and Cranberry Bog
- Brankley Pastures
- Brough Park Fields
- Brown End Quarry
- Castern Wood
- Cecilly Brook
- Cotton Dell
- Craddocks Moss
- Croxall Lakes
- Doxey Marshes
- Gentleshaw Common
- George's Hayes
- Gun Moor
- Hales Hall Pool
- Harston Wood
- Hem Heath Woods
- Highgate Common
- Hoften's Cross Meadow
- Ipstones Edge
- Jackson's Coppice and Marsh
- Knotbury Common
- Ladderedge Country Park
- Leycett Meadows
- Loynton Moss
- Marshes Hill Common
- Newpool Meadows
- Parrot's Drumble
- Pasturefields Saltmarsh
- Radford Meadows
- Rod Wood
- Side Farm Meadows
- The Roaches
- The Wolseley Centre Nature Reserve
- Thorswood
- Tucklesholme
- Weag's Barn
- Wetley Moor Common
