= Pasturefields Saltmarsh =

Nature reserve in Staffordshire, England

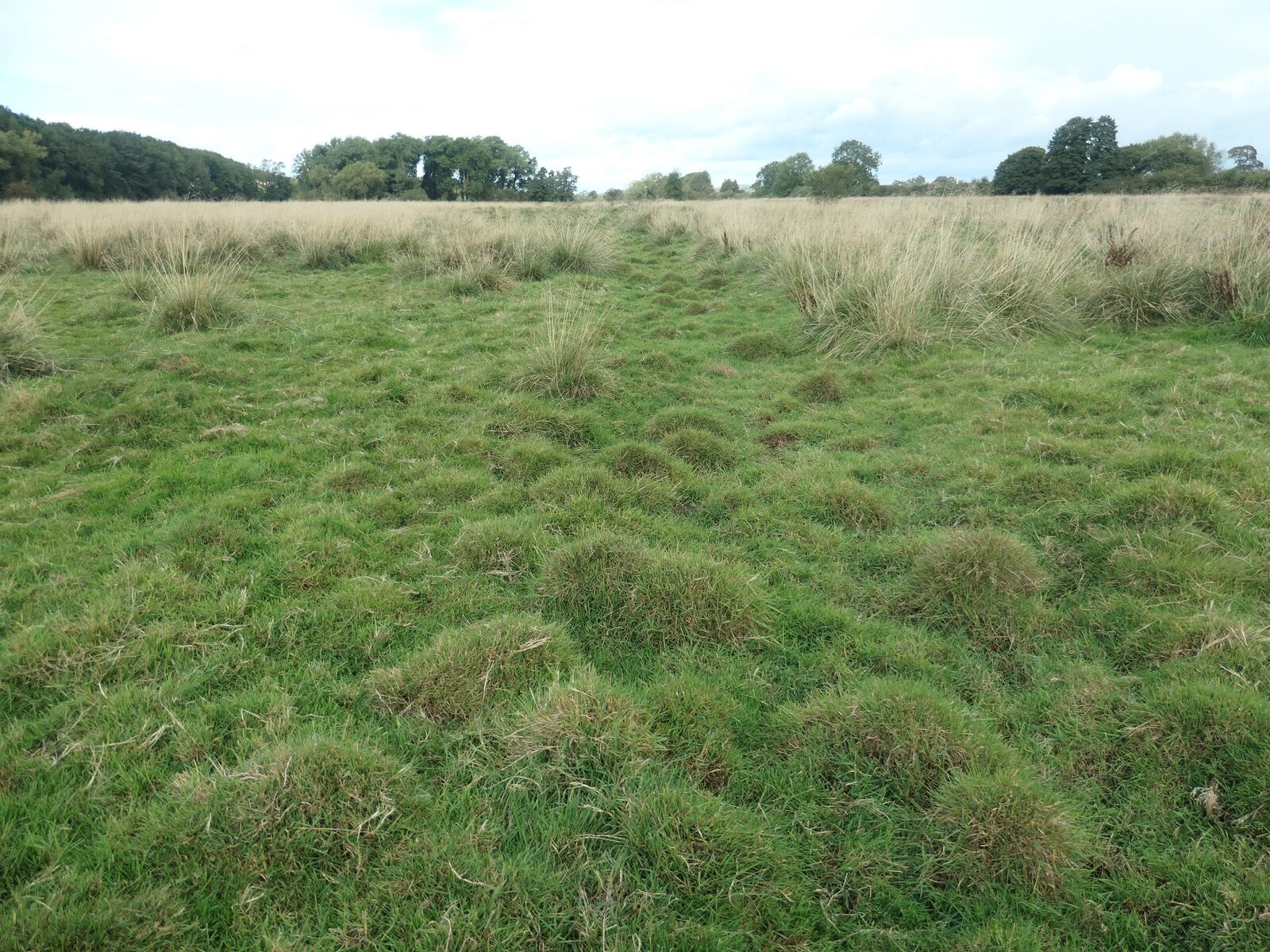

- Location within Staffordshire
- Location: Near Stafford, Staffordshire
- OS grid: SJ 9923 2473
- Coordinates: 52°49′12″N 2°00′46″W
- Area: 8 hectares (20 acres)
- Operator: Staffordshire Wildlife Trust
- Designation: Site of Special Scientific Interest; Special Area of Conservation
- Website: www.staffs-wildlife.org.uk/nature-reserves/pasturefields-saltmarsh

Pasturefields Saltmarsh is nature reserve of Staffordshire Wildlife Trust, a salt marsh near Stafford, in Staffordshire, England. It is designated a Site of Special Scientific Interest and a Special Area of Conservation.

== Description ==
The Joint Nature Conservation Committee (JNCC) notes that it is the only known remaining natural inland salt meadow in the UK. The site, near the River Trent, is what remains from the former salt marshes in the Trent Valley where there was once brine extraction; there are two old brine wells on the site.

Visitors are advised to keep to the higher ground of the reserve, as there are unfenced wet ditches and boggy areas. There is no parking area.

=== Habitats and wildlife ===
The plants in the marsh are halophytes, normally found in estuaries and coastal marshes. Seeds of these plants may have reached this site on the feet of migrating birds.

Plants to be found here include red fescue, common saltmarsh-grass, lesser sea-spurrey, saltmarsh rush, sea plantain and sea milkwort.

It is a habitat for wading birds such as snipe and lapwing; other birds to be seen include meadow pipit, kestrel and grey heron. Visitors are asked not to wander beyond the field gate during the bird breeding season.
