= Leek Moors =

Protected area in Staffordshire, England

- Site of Special Scientific Interest
- Location within Staffordshire
- Location of Leek Moors.
- Area of search: Staffordshire
- Grid reference: SK 027 655
- Coordinates: 53.186587°N 1.9610509°W
- Area: 9,353.2 acres (37.85 km^{2}; 14.61 sq mi)
- Notification date: 1988

Leek Moors is a Site of Special Scientific Interest (SSSI) within Staffordshire Moorlands, England, near the villages Leek and Upper Hulme. This protected area includes the former SSSI called Oliver Hill. The site was designated because of its outstanding assemblage of upland breeding birds and the populations of golden plover and snipe that occur here. There are populations of cloudberry (Rubus chamaemorus) on Oliver Hill.

Leek Moors SSSI includes Black Brook and Knotbury Common.

Two major institutional landowners own land within Leek Moors SSSI: United Utilities and the Ministry of Defence.
