= Moss Carr =

Protected area in Staffordshire, England

Coordinates: 53°11′24″N 1°53′33″W

Moss Carr is a Site of Special Scientific Interest (SSSI) within the Peak District National Park in Staffordshire, England. It is located 1.8 km northwest of the village of Longnor near the headwaters of the River Manifold. This area is protected because of the peatland present that has a diversity of plant species.

== Biology ==
Tree species include downy birch and grey willow. In areas with heather and cross-leaved heath, plant species also include hare's tail cottongrass, cranberry and heath spotted-orchid. In waterlogged fen vegetation, plant species include bogbean, marsh bedstraw, common valerian, marsh marigold, meadowsweet, creeping willow and marsh lousewort. In marshy grassland, plant species include common spotted-orchid and northern marsh-orchid.

Bird species recorded in this protected area include stonechat.

== Geology ==
Formation of peat soils is favourable here as the underlying rocks are Carboniferous mudstones that retain water.
