= Gun (Staffordshire) =

Hill in Staffordshire, England

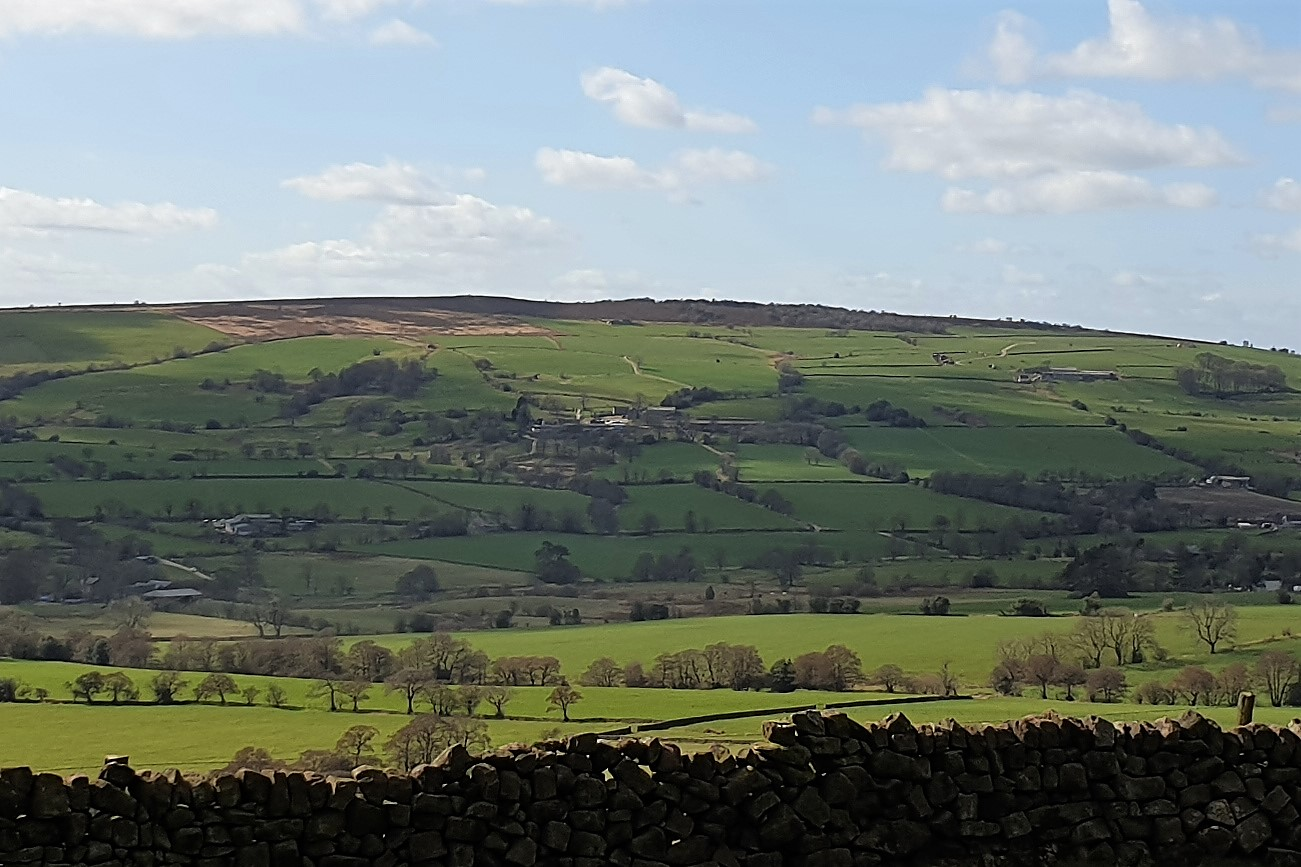
- View from The Roaches

Highest point
- Elevation: 385 m (1,263 ft)
- Prominence: 168 m (551 ft)
- Parent peak: Shining Tor
- Listing: Marilyn
- Coordinates: 53.150°N 2.046°W

Geography
- Location: Staffordshire, England
- Parent range: Peak District
- OS grid: SJ970615
- Topo map: OS Landranger 118

Gun is a hill at the southern end of the Peak District, overlooking the town of Leek in the Staffordshire Moorlands. The hill is mainly moorland with some small wooded areas. Neighbouring peaks to the east are The Roaches, Hen Cloud and Ramshaw Rocks. It is a nature reserve of the Staffordshire Wildlife Trust.

== Description ==
The hill has height 385 metres (1,263 ft), and there is a trig point at the summit. Having a prominence of 168 metres (551 ft), it is a Marilyn.

Gun has the Summits on the Air reference G/SP-013. The hill often features in the itinerary of the Tour of Britain cycle race.

=== Gun Moor ===
Gun Moor, area 78 hectares (190 acres), is a nature reserve of the Staffordshire Wildlife Trust. There is moorland, woodland and blanket bog. Uncommon species of bird such as lesser redpoll and cuckoo may be seen, and bog asphodel flowers in the summer. There is a circular walk, over hilly terrain, that takes 1½ to 2½ hours.

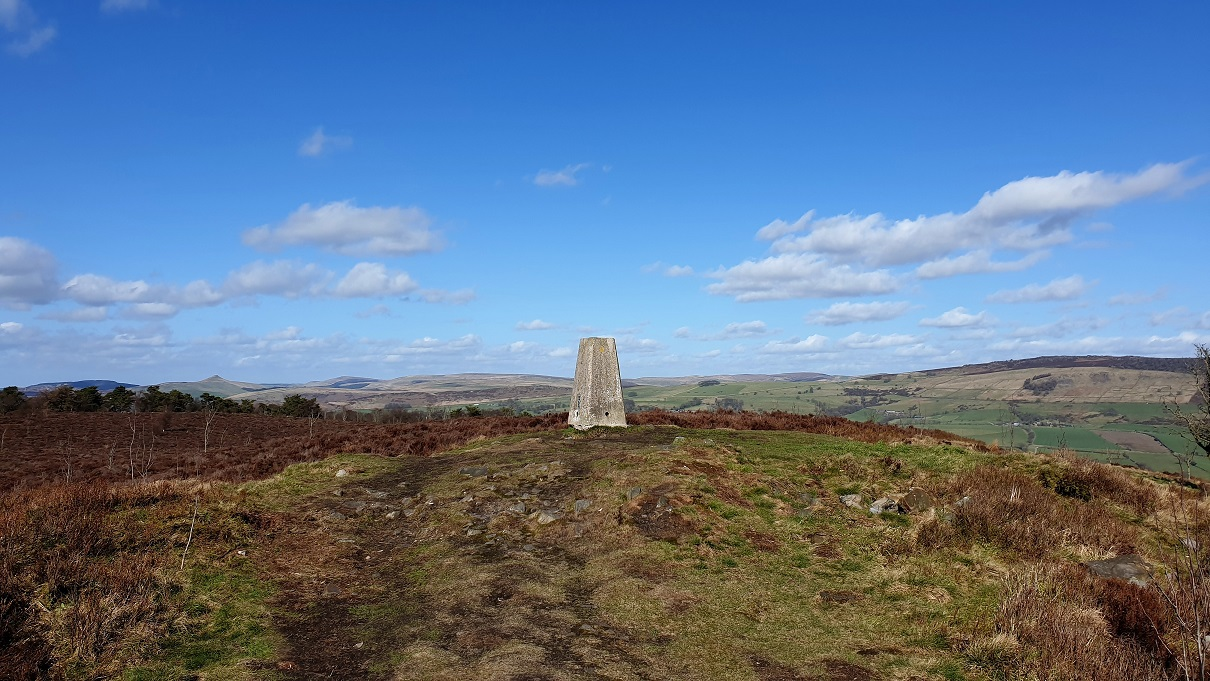
View north from the summit

Gun Moor was purchased when it came to the market in 2019. The Trust was aware that the moor was important and that it did not carry any protection; in order to secure the site, it was purchased by the Esmée Fairbairn Foundation, and the Trust agreed to buy the site within two years, at the original price. After donations from individuals and charitable trusts, this was achieved. Jeff Sim, Head of Nature Reserves and species recovery, said: "The habitat Gun Moor contains is what makes the Peak District Moors of international significance, so it is really important that the Trust was able to purchase and protect it."

=== Gun Moor Meadow ===
During summer 2022, the Trust took out a loan to buy Gun Moor Meadow, bordering the north western edge of Gun Moor. In January 2023 the Trust announced that, thanks to donations, it was able to repay the loan.

The meadow has area 7 acres (2.8 ha). The land will be allowed to rewet, by filling in drainage ditches, and cattle will lightly graze at certain times of the year, so that bog asphodel and cranberry will be re-established; the land will attract wildlife whose habitat has been reduced in recent years.
