= The Roaches =

Ridge in Staffordshire, England

Coordinates: 53.1713°N 2.0000°W

Highest point
- Elevation: 505 m (1,657 ft)
- Prominence: c. 120 m (394 ft)
- Parent peak: Shining Tor
- Listing: Dewey

Geography
- Location: Staffordshire, England
- Parent range: Peak District
- OS grid: SK001638
- Topo map: OS Landranger 119110

The Roaches (from the French les roches – the rocks) is a prominent rocky ridge above Leek and Tittesworth Reservoir in the Staffordshire Peak District of England. The ridge with its rock formations rises steeply to 505 m (1,657 ft).

Along with Ramshaw Rocks and Hen Cloud, from Old English Henge Clud, meaning "steep rock", they form a gritstone escarpment, which is popular with hikers, rock climbers and freerunners. It is often very busy especially at weekends.

The Roaches Estate was purchased by the Peak District National Park Authority in the 1980s to safeguard the area from adverse development. From May 2013 Staffordshire Wildlife Trust took on the management of the Roaches Estate.

In clear conditions, it is possible to see much of Cheshire and views stretching as far as Snowdon in Wales and Winter Hill in Lancashire.

The Roaches are the most prominent part of a curving ridge which extends for several miles from Hen Cloud in the south to Back Forest and Hangingstone in the northwest. At the top there is a small pool called Doxey Pool that is, according to legend, inhabited by a water spirit. Nearby are the broad hills of Gun and Morridge.

== Geology ==
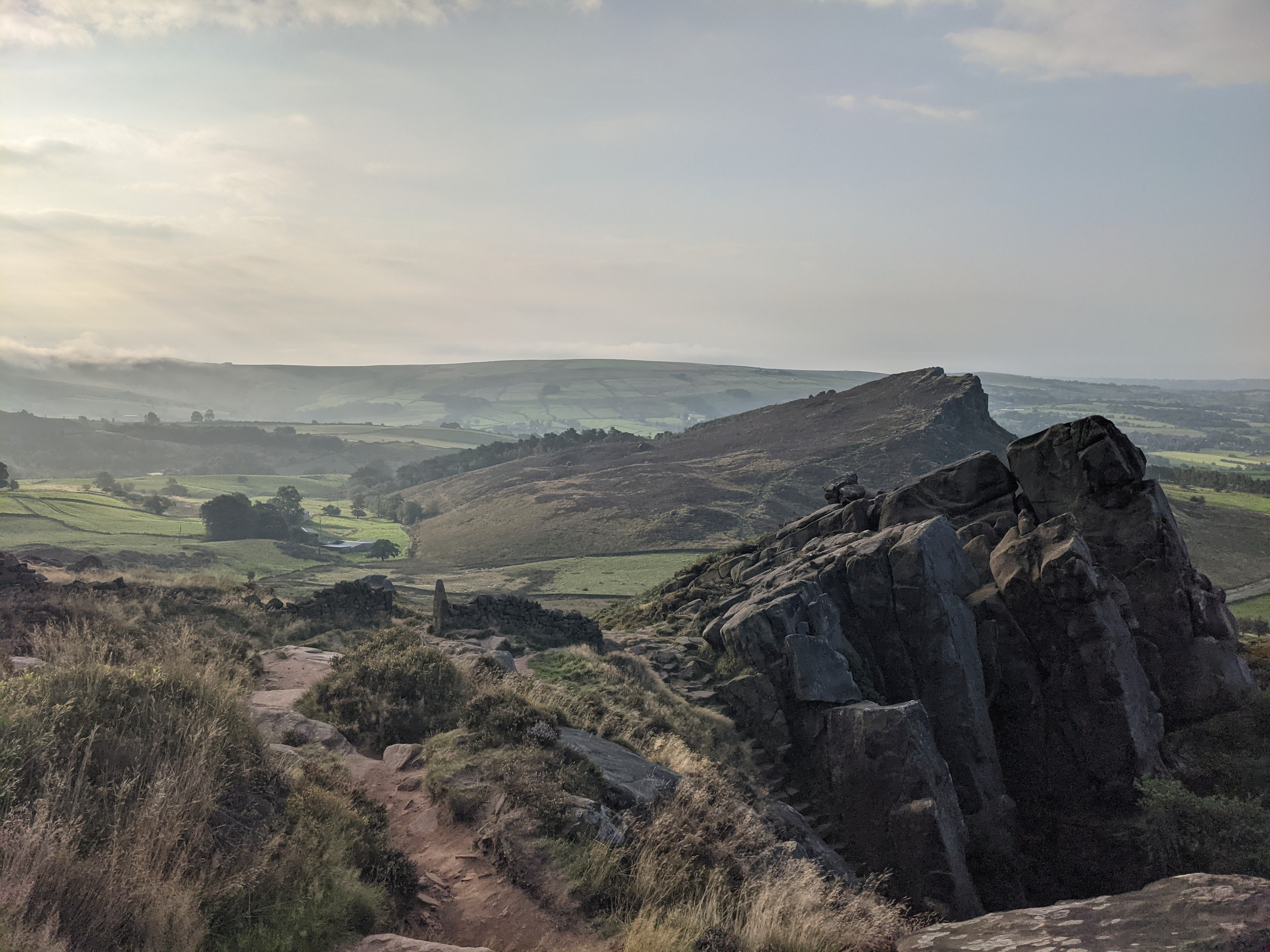
Looking southeast over the Roaches and Hen Cloud

The Roaches, Hen Cloud, and Ramshaw Rocks are formed from a thick bed of coarse sandstone ('gritstone') of Namurian age, a subdivision of the NW European Carboniferous system from ca 315 to 326.4 Ma, which occurs widely across the Peak District and takes its name, the Roaches Grit, from this location. The nearby Five Clouds are formed from a thinner bed of similar sandstone known as the Five Clouds Sandstone. These sandstones originated as delta sands dropped by major rivers draining a mountainous landmass to the north. The sandstone beds of both The Roaches and Hen Cloud dip moderately steeply to the east into the north–south-aligned syncline known as the Goyt Trough. The same beds at Ramshaw Rocks dip steeply to the northwest into the syncline. The southern end of the Roaches is defined by the presence of an east–west fault that runs through the col separating the Roaches from Hen Cloud.

== Wildlife ==
In the 1930s five Australian Bennett's wallabies were released into the wild from a private collection. The colony survived into the 21st century but may now be extinct.

In 2008, a pair of peregrine falcons successfully bred on the Roaches, causing climbing on part of the rock face to be suspended for a period. Since then, the resident pair of peregrine falcons has had further successful hatchings, although there have also been cases of theft of eggs and young birds at the site.

== Doxey Pool ==
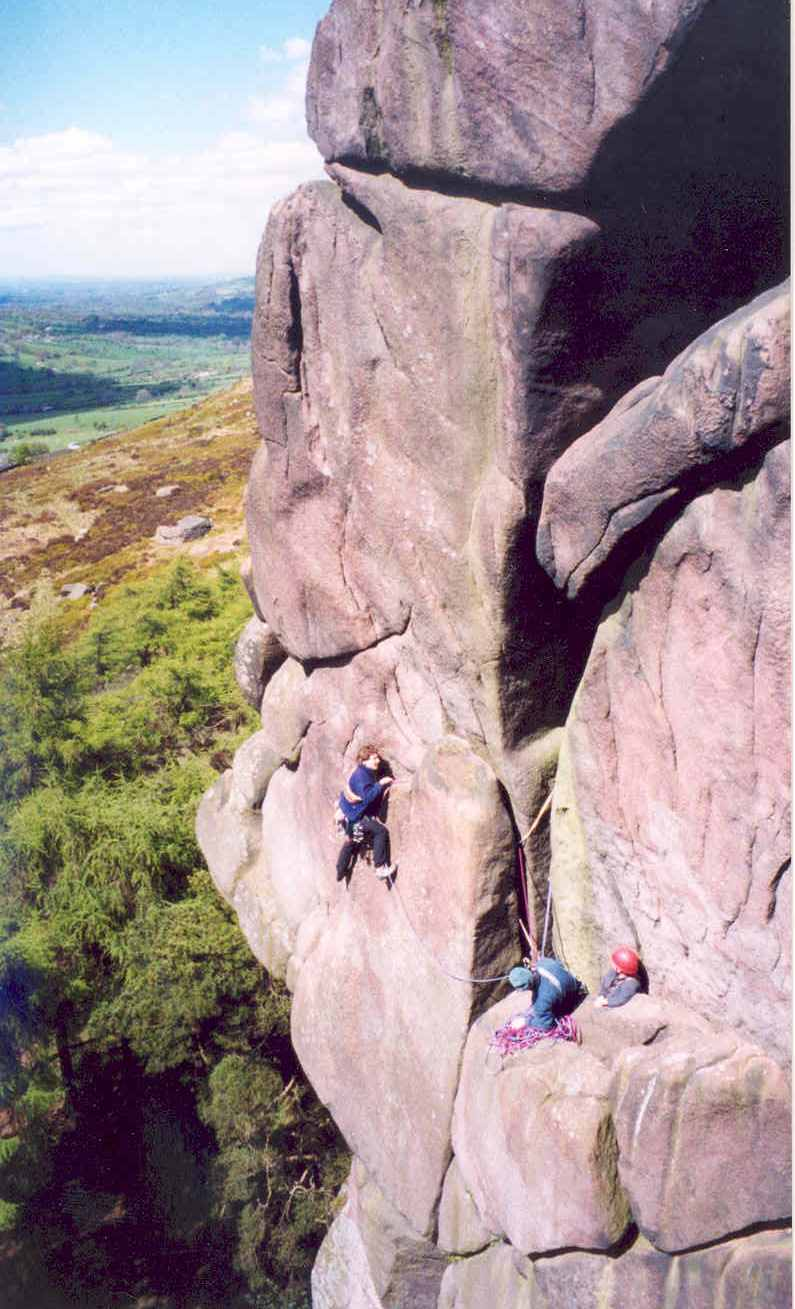
Climbers on Valkyrie at The Roaches

Doxey Pool (sometimes spelt Docksey) is a small pond, measuring about 15 by 10 metres (49 by 33 ft), by the top path of The Roaches at grid reference SK004628. Legend has it that this pool is inhabited by a mermaid called Jenny Greenteeth known as the blue nymph. The legend says that she fell in the pool on a foggy day whilst walking along the top of the Roaches, and ever since has been enticing unsuspecting victims down to the pool to a watery grave.

== The Winking Man ==
The Winking Man rock formation (also known as the Winking Eye) is one of the buttresses at Ramshaw Rocks east of The Roaches. It can be seen from the Leek–Buxton road (A53) about 5 miles outside Leek. A slender rib of rock jutting out from the buttress is pierced by a natural hole. The silhouette of the rib against the sky looks like a face sticking out of the hillside, and to the traveller driving past in a car towards Buxton the 'eye' appears to wink, as another pinnacle of rock passes behind the face as a consequence of parallax. A public house near Ramshaw Rocks at Upper Hulme takes its name from the Winking Man rock.

== Don Whillans Memorial Hut ==
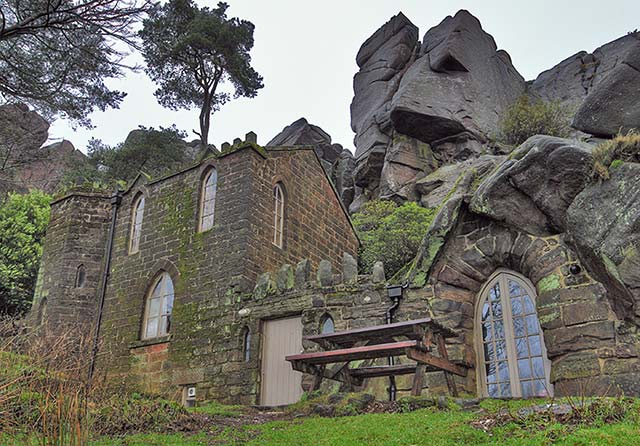
Rockhall Cottage, the Don Whillans Memorial Hut at the Roaches

The Roaches is the site of the Don Whillans Memorial Hut, also known as the Rockhall Cottage. This Grade II listed building may have been a shooting box, and is built in cottage orné style.
