= Heathylee =

Civil parish in Staffordshire, England

Coordinates: 53°10′23″N 1°57′23″W

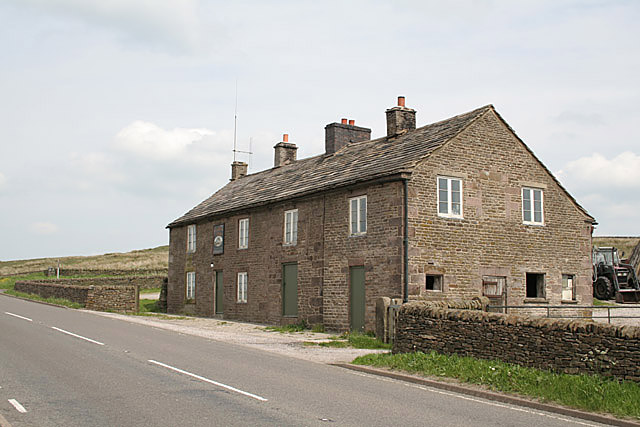
- Royal Cottage, on the A53

- Location within Staffordshire
- OS grid reference: SK 03 64
- District: Staffordshire Moorlands
- Shire county: Staffordshire
- Region: West Midlands
- Country: England
- Sovereign state: United Kingdom
- Police: Staffordshire
- Fire: Staffordshire
- Ambulance: West Midlands
- UK Parliament: Staffordshire Moorlands

Heathylee is a civil parish in the district of Staffordshire Moorlands in north-east Staffordshire, England.

There is no village centre. The parish has a boundary with Leekfrith in the west and with Hollinsclough in the north; there is a short eastern boundary, at the River Manifold, with Sheen, and to the south are the parishes of Bradnop, Onecote and Longnor. Morridge separates the area into a western part, drained by the River Churnet, and a larger eastern part drained by the Manifold and its tributary Oakenclough Brook. The hamlet of Upper Hulme is in the south-west.

== History ==
Heathylee was formerly a township in the parish of Alstonefield. It was described in The National Gazetteer of Great Britain and Ireland in 1868: "The township, which is considerable, is situated near the river Dove, and comprises the village of Hardingsbooth, with the straggling hamlets of Broncote, Morredge-Top, Middle Hills, and Downsdale. The soil chiefly consists of moorland, with a few small plots of arable land. Longnor church and other places of worship in the adjoining townships are frequented by the inhabitants. Sir John Harpur Crew is lord of the manor."

In 1988, an area of 2,034.9 hectares (5,028 acres) of farmland was recorded, of which 1,609.6 hectares (3,977 acres) was grassland and 402.6 hectares (995 acres) was rough grazing. There was dairy and sheep farming.

=== Buildings ===
The road from Leek to Buxton (part of the A53) passes through Heathylee. It was laid out in the 1760s. Royal Cottage (grid reference SK027639), a building on the road, was known by that name by 1833; it was believed that Prince Charles Edward Stuart slept in the house on his journey through England during the Jacobite rising of 1745. It is now known that he stayed in Leek; whether there was a building on the site before the road was constructed is not known.

Longnor Sawmill (grid reference SK084646; a Grade II listed building), near the bridge over the Manifold near Longnor, dates in its present form from the early 19th century. It is on the site of an earlier mill built in 1605 by Sir John Harpur, which was a replacement of a mill on a nearby site, known by 1404 as Frith Mill.

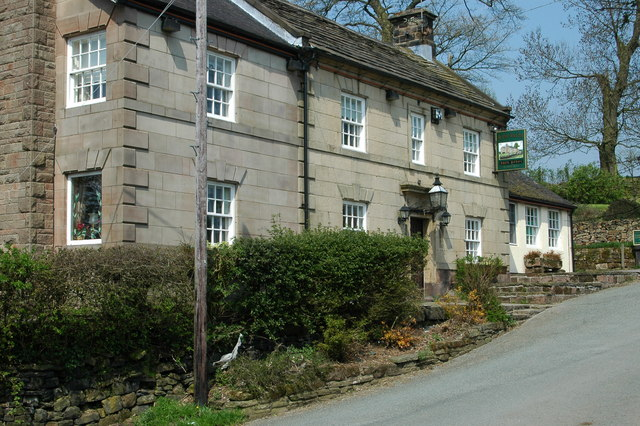
The Rock Inn

The hamlet of Upper Hulme, in the south-west, was there by the mid-13th century. The Rock Inn (grid reference SK013609; a Grade II listed building), at Upper Hulme, was built in the late 18th century; in 1786 it was occupied by Joseph Billing, who worked a nearby quarry. It was an inn by the 1820s, known as the New Inn.

== See also ==
- Listed buildings in Heathylee
