= Dane Valley Way =

Long-distance footpath in England

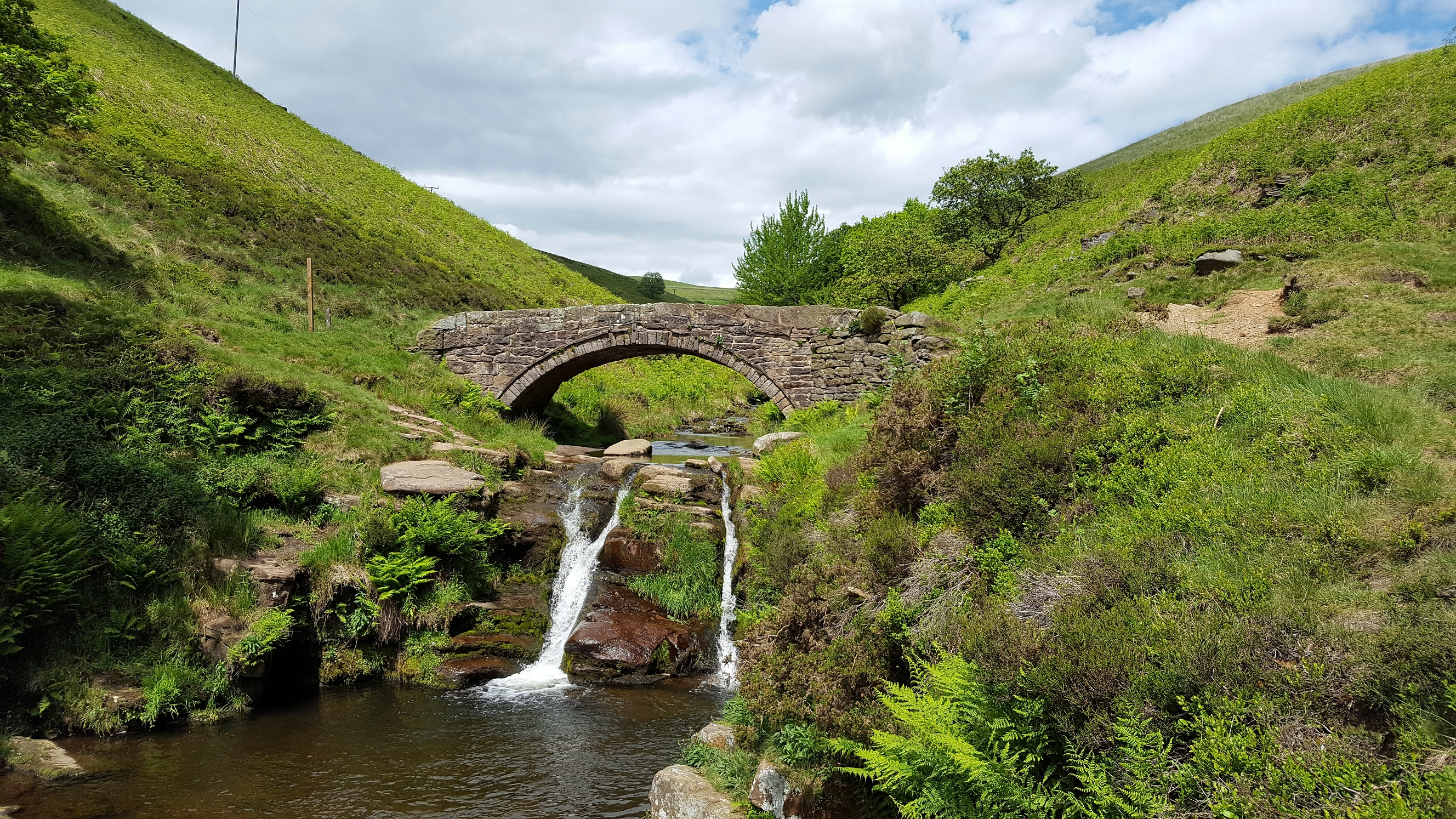
- The Dane Valley Way at Three Shires Head
- Length: 48 miles (77 km)
- Location: Central England
- Trailheads: Buxton, Derbyshire; Northwich, Cheshire
- Use: Hiking
- Highest point: 524 metres (1,719 ft)

The Dane Valley Way is a long-distance footpath through Derbyshire, Staffordshire and Cheshire, England. It runs from the Pavilion Gardens in Buxton to the end of the River Dane, where it enters the River Weaver in Northwich.

== The route ==
The route is largely downhill after the first 3 miles of ascent and it follows rights of way along or near the course of the River Dane, past its source at Dane Head in Derbyshire and down to its end at its confluence with the River Weaver in Cheshire. The River Dane is the longest, cleanest and thought to be the fastest flowing river through Cheshire.

The initial section from Buxton climbs through Grinlow Woods to Solomon's Temple at the summit of Grin Hill, providing superb views across the Dark Peak. The trail crosses Axe Edge Moor (over 500m high and the watershed between the Irish Sea and the North Sea), where the River Dane originates at Dane Head. It passes the scenic Three Shires Head (where Derbyshire, Staffordshire and Cheshire boundaries meet) with its stone footbridge and cascades. During the eighteenth century, fugitives used Three Shires Head to cross into a neighbouring county, in order to flee from police who could only operate within their own county. The path continues along the wooded Dane Valley through the hamlets of Gradbach, Danebridge and Wincle. It leaves the Peak District and goes on through Eaton, Congleton, Swettenham, Brereton Heath Nature Reserve, Holmes Chapel and Middlewich, where the River Dane joins the River Wheelock. The second half of the route includes considerable walking on roads.

== History ==
The Dane Valley Way was proposed in 1970 by Congleton Regional District Council (RDC).

In 2013 the second half of the route was modified to avoid major roads and extended from its original finish in Middlewich to Northwich. The route is marked on OS Explorer Maps OL24 and 268 and is waymarked with the initials DVW.

There are links with the Midshires Way, the Staffordshire Way the Gritstone Trail, the South Cheshire Way, the Cheshire Ring Canal Walk and Trent and Mersey Canal Walk. Details of connecting routes may be found on the Dane Valley Way page of the Long Distance Walkers' Association website.
