= Flash, Staffordshire =

Village in Staffordshire, England

Coordinates: 53.2011°N 1.9633°W

Flash
- Village
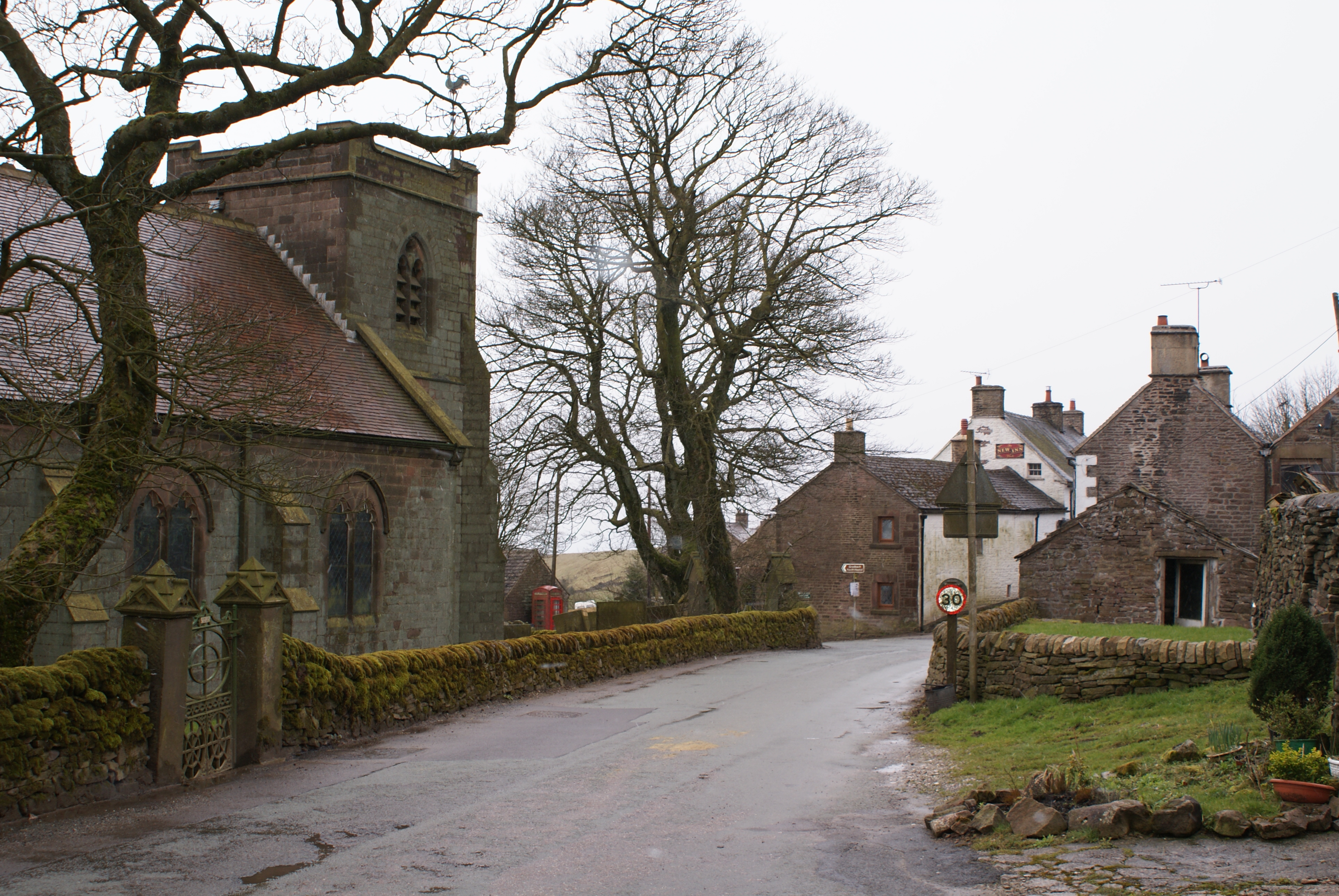

- Location within Staffordshire
- OS grid reference: SK024671
  - London: 171 mi (275 km)
- District: Staffordshire Moorlands
- Shire county: Staffordshire
- Region: West Midlands
- Country: England
- Sovereign state: United Kingdom
- Post town: BUXTON
- Postcode district: SK17
- Dialling code: 01298
- Police: Staffordshire
- Fire: Staffordshire
- Ambulance: West Midlands
- UK Parliament: Staffordshire Moorlands

Flash is a village in the Staffordshire Moorlands and the Peak District National Park, England. At 1,519 feet (463 m) above sea level, it is the highest village in the United Kingdom (some sources claim a height of 1,531 feet (467 m) for Wanlockhead in Scotland, but a survey in 2019 showed that there are no buildings in Wanlockhead at that elevation). Flash was an early centre for Wesleyanism.

== Location and geography ==
Flash is the main village in Quarnford parish. It lies just off the A53 main road about 4 miles (6.4 km) southwest of Buxton. It is on the southern slope of the highest ground on Axe Edge Moor, which rises to a peak of 551 m (1,808 ft). The parish forms the Staffordshire corner of Three Shire Heads, a tripoint marked by a packhorse bridge on the River Dane, where Staffordshire, Derbyshire and Cheshire meet.

To the south is Morridge, with a trig point at 489 m (1,604 ft) at Merryton Low which provides views across the Cheshire Plain and The Roaches, including Ramshaw Rocks and Hen Cloud. The Winking Man is a rock outcrop on Ramshaw Rocks that resembles a human face in profile; its eyehole appears to wink to passing travellers on the A53.

East of Flash, and just over the A53, are the heads of the River Dove and River Manifold. Further south is the source of the River Churnet and to the north is the source of the River Goyt. The River Dane also rises within the parish.

=== Highest village in Britain ===
At 1,519 ft (463 m) above sea level, Flash claims to be the highest village in the United Kingdom. In 2007 the claim was upheld by the BBC, which settled a dispute with its rival claimant, Wanlockhead in Dumfries and Galloway. The Ordnance Survey measured the highest house in each village, and the one in Flash was higher, although the results were disputed by residents of the Scottish village, which has a sign proclaiming that a height of 1,531 ft above sea level. Ordnance Survey mapping shows the buildings of Wanlockhead to be wholly below the 450-metre (1,480 ft) contour (with the exception of Glengonnar Station on the Leadhills and Wanlockhead Railway, which is well outside the village), whereas Flash is wholly above the 450m contour.

The former Methodist Chapel in Flash is the highest in Britain; this distinction is helped by the scarcity of Methodist chapels in the Southern Uplands.

== The village ==
During the first half of the 19th century, the population of the parish was around 700; it had reduced to half that by the end of the 1800s. In 1851 there were 40 agricultural labourers, about the same number of silk workers, and almost as many colliers. There were also stonemasons, dressmakers, blacksmiths and cordwainers, and a shoemaker, errand boy, wheelwright, game-keeper, grocer, peddler and tailor, as well as a number of house servants, 275 young people and 50 scholars. At one time 29 families were receiving weekly relief and 23 families occasional relief, nearly a quarter of the population.

The first record of coalmining in the parish comes from 1401 when Thomas Smith took a year's lease on the 'vein coal' of Black Brook, near Upper Hulme. There was a large number of coal pits in the area, including Orchard Common, Blackclough, Hope, Goldsitch and Knotbury. They were worked throughout the 18th and 19th centuries, and some into the early 20th century, for both commercial and domestic use.

Flash is an isolated community with a small population. It had had a school, attended by as few as four pupils, which is now closed. Flash previously had a reputation for being a centre for illegal activities such as cock fighting and counterfeiting ('Flash money'). According to some sources, the counterfeit money manufactured at Flash used to be exchanged at the nearby Three Shire Heads (where Staffordshire, Cheshire and Derbyshire meet, and where prizefighting was also said to have taken place).

The property at the junction of Brown Lane and the A53 called Saltswell (formally named Roupious Stone, meaning Auction Stone) was built in 1686. There, livestock auctions were held in its fields, and cockfights happened in the Quarnford Cock Pit in the field behind the property. The cock pit is still visible today but is not open to the public.

The village currently has a village shop, Flash Bar Stores, and the Flash Brewery.

St Paul's is the parish church of Quarnford, in the middle of Flash village. The church was rebuilt in 1901 to the design by Buxton architect William Radford Bryden and is a Grade II listed building.

== Methodist history ==
Wesleyan Methodism was well established in Flash during the 18th century, and a chapel was built as early as 1784. At that time there were 61 Methodist "members of Society". This suggests that Flash became a centre from which Methodism spread into other neighbouring villages, such as Hollinsclough.

== Transport ==
Buses are run by Aimee's and Ashbourne Community Transport.

== See also ==
- Listed buildings in Quarnford
