= 2023 Staffordshire Moorlands District Council election =

2023 English local election

- 4 May 2023

All 56 seats to Staffordshire Moorlands District Council 29 seats needed for a majority

	First party	Second party	Third party
Leader	Mike Gledhill	Paul Roberts
Party	Labour	Conservative	Independent
Last election	13 seats, 26.0%	25 seats, 36.3%	17 seats, 28.5%
Seats before	15	29	11 (Note: Of the eleven independent councillors before the election, six formed the "Independent" group led by Linda Malyon and five formed the "Independent Alliance" group led by Tony Hall.)
Seats won	24	22	8
Seat change	▲11	▼3	▼9
Popular vote	17,186	16,242	7,961
Percentage	36.7%	34.7%	17.0%
Swing	▲10.7%	▼1.6%	▼11.5%
	Fourth party	Fifth party
Party	Green	Liberal Democrats
Last election	0 seats, 5.1%	1 seat, 4.2%
Seats before	0	1
Seats won	1	1
Seat change	▲1	Steady
Popular vote	3,538	1,745
Percentage	7.6%	3.7%
Swing	▲2.5%	▼0.5%
- Winner of each seat at the 2023 Staffordshire Moorlands District Council Election
Leader before election
Paul Roberts
Conservative
Leader after election
Mike Gledhill
Labour
No overall control

The 2023 Staffordshire Moorlands District Council election took place on 4 May 2023 to elect all 56 members of Staffordshire Moorlands District Council in Staffordshire, England. This was on the same day as other local elections across England.

The Conservatives lost their majority at this election, with the council going under no overall control and Labour overtaking the Conservatives to become the largest party.

== Summary ==
At the previous 2019 election the Conservatives had lost control of the council to no overall control and subsequently formed an administration with some of the independent councillors. Following a number of by-elections and changes of allegiance the Conservatives regained a majority of the seats on the council during May 2022.

Following the results, the Conservatives lost the council to no overall control. Labour was the largest party after the election and was able to form a minority administration with the informal support of independent councillors. Labour's group leader, Mike Gledhill, was appointed leader of the council at the subsequent annual council meeting on 17 May 2023.

== Results ==
2023 Staffordshire Moorlands District Council Election
Party	Candidates	Seats	Gains	Losses	Net gain/loss	Seats %	Votes %	Votes	+/−
Labour	35	24	9	0	▲11	42.9	36.7	17,186	+10.7
Conservative	39	22	1	4	▼3	39.3	34.7	16,242	-1.6
Green	13	1	1	0	▲1	1.8	7.6	3,538	+2.5
Liberal Democrats	7	1	1	1	Steady	1.8	3.7	1,745	-0.5
Reform	1	0	0	0	Steady	-	0.3	135	N/A
Independent	25	8	0	9	▼9	14.3	17.0	7,961	-11.5

== Ward results ==
The results for each ward were as follows, with an asterisk (*) indicating an incumbent councillor standing for re-election.

=== Alton ===
Alton
Party	Candidate	Votes	%	±%
Conservative	Nigel John Moult	209	54.9	−11.6
Labour	Jenny Lingham	172	45.1	+11.6
Turnout		381	33.3	
Conservative hold		Swing		

=== Bagnall and Stanley ===
Bagnall and Stanley
Party	Candidate	Votes	%	±%
Conservative	Charlotte Hannah Edwards	356	53.7	−17.1
Independent	Sybil Ralphs*	189	28.5	−42.3
Labour	Dave Jennings	79	11.9	−1.0
Liberal Democrats	Lee Jagger	39	5.9	N/A
Turnout		666	49.0	
Conservative hold		Swing		

Sybil Ralphs had been a Conservative prior to the election but stood as an independent in 2023. Seat shown as Conservative hold to allow comparison with 2019 results.

=== Biddulph East ===
Biddulph East
Party	Candidate	Votes	%	±%
Labour	Jill Salt*	583	72.2	+21.7
Labour	Connor Brady*	451	55.9	+16.7
Labour	Christopher Wood	435	53.9	+6.5
Independent	Sheryl Bayley	219	27.1	N/A
Independent	Chris Perkin	191	23.7	−10.6
Liberal Democrats	Geoff Preston	109	13.5	N/A
Turnout		807	18.4	
Labour hold		Swing		
Labour hold		Swing		
Labour hold		Swing		

=== Biddulph Moor ===
Biddulph Moor
Party	Candidate	Votes	%	±%
Independent	John Thomas Jones*	308	75.3	−5.2
Labour	Jim Bostock	101	24.7	+19.5
Turnout		409	30.2	
Independent hold		Swing		

=== Biddulph North ===
Biddulph North
Party	Candidate	Votes	%	±%
Labour	Adam Parkes	652	51.7	+25.1
Independent	Jim Garvey	643	51.0	N/A
Independent	Andrew Hart*	641	50.8	−7.2
Independent	Ken Harper	440	34.9	N/A
Green	Ian Waite	277	22.0	+3.5
Turnout		1,261	28.6	
Labour gain from Independent		Swing		
Independent hold		Swing		
Independent hold		Swing		

=== Biddulph South ===
Biddulph South
Party	Candidate	Votes	%	±%
Labour	Andrew Stuart Cunningham Church	207	46.8	+27.0
Independent	Adrian Charles Lawton	176	39.8	N/A
Liberal Democrats	Roy William Gregg	59	13.3	−20.9
Turnout		442	32.4	
Labour gain from Liberal Democrats		Swing		

=== Biddulph West ===
Biddulph West
Party	Candidate	Votes	%	±%
Labour	Nigel Yates*	482	44.7	+9.8
Labour	Dave Proudlove*	451	41.8	N/A
Labour	Charlie Smith*	440	40.8	N/A
Conservative	Derek James Stubbs	419	38.8	+7.9
Conservative	Maj Stubbs	344	31.9	+5.1
Conservative	Mark Andrew Stubbs	328	30.4	+15.6
Independent	Neil Eardley	282	26.1	N/A
Independent	Alistair McLoughlin	225	20.9	N/A
Turnout		1,079	27.0	
Labour gain from Independent		Swing		
Labour hold		Swing		
Labour gain from Conservative		Swing		

=== Brown Edge and Endon ===
Brown Edge and Endon
Party	Candidate	Votes	%	±%
Conservative	Joe Porter*	707	50.3	+9.5
Conservative	Keith Flunder*	606	43.1	−5.3
Liberal Democrats	Christina Jebb	585	41.6	+11.6
Conservative	Roy Alan James Molson	506	36.0	−5.4
Liberal Democrats	Danielle Spooner	452	32.1	+9.1
Labour	Joy Majekodunmi	436	31.0	+10.9
Liberal Democrats	John Redfern*	339	24.1	N/A
Turnout		1,406	36.2	
Conservative hold		Swing		
Conservative hold		Swing		
Liberal Democrats gain from Conservative		Swing		

=== Caverswall ===
Caverswall
Party	Candidate	Votes	%	±%
Conservative	Paul Roberts*	241	53.3	−26.8
Labour	Chris Podszus	211	46.7	+26.8
Turnout		452	31.1	
Conservative hold		Swing		

=== Cellarhead ===
Cellarhead
Party	Candidate	Votes	%	±%
Conservative	Barbara Aillen Hughes*	403	59.5	+8.1
Conservative	Patricia Ann Hughes	319	47.1	−11.3
Green	James Martin Firkins	267	39.4	+0.5
Green	Julian Bernard King-Salter	244	36.0	N/A
Turnout		677	26.0	
Conservative hold		Swing		
Conservative hold		Swing		

=== Cheadle North East ===
Cheadle North East
Party	Candidate	Votes	%	±%
Labour	Liz Whitehouse	284	41.7	+24.6
Labour	Matthew Charles Spooner	245	36.0	N/A
Conservative	Phil Routledge*	233	34.2	−0.4
Conservative	Stephen Ellis*	231	33.9	N/A
Independent	Julie Bull	176	25.8	+4.1
Independent	Dennis Wilson	130	19.1	N/A
Turnout		681	23.8	
Labour gain from Independent		Swing		
Labour gain from Independent		Swing		

Phil Routledge had been elected as an independent in 2019 but joined the Conservatives in May 2022. Stephen Ellis had won the seat in a by-election in May 2021 following the death of the previous independent councillor. Both seats shown as independent losses to allow comparison with 2019 results.

=== Cheadle South East ===
Cheadle South East
Party	Candidate	Votes	%	±%
Labour	Mike Haines	466	57.0	+30.7
Labour	Vicky O'Shea	401	49.1	N/A
Conservative	Peter Jackson*	341	41.7	+18.8
Conservative	Zenobia Rose Lillian Routledge*	324	39.7	N/A
Turnout		817	28.5	
Labour gain from Independent		Swing		
Labour gain from Independent		Swing		

Both seats had been won by independents in 2019, but Peter Jackson won his seat in a by-election in May 2021 and Zenobia Routledge won her seat in a by-election in May 2022. Both seats shown as independent losses to allow comparison with 2019 results.

=== Cheadle West ===
Cheadle West
Party	Candidate	Votes	%	±%
Independent	Kate Mills*	602	52.9	+7.4
Independent	Gary Bentley*	551	48.4	+9.8
Independent	Ian William Plant*	464	40.7	−0.3
Labour	Bernie Charlesworth	438	38.5	N/A
Conservative	Jonathan Nicholas Mason	334	29.3	−3.2
Turnout		1,139	28.6	
Independent hold		Swing		
Independent hold		Swing		
Independent hold		Swing		

=== Checkley ===
Checkley
Party	Candidate	Votes	%	±%
Independent	Peter Wilkinson*	629	47.2	+1.5
Conservative	Mark Anthony Deaville*	603	45.2	−3.3
Conservative	Alan Hulme*	532	39.9	−0.8
Labour	Liz Haines	399	29.9	+9.0
Independent	Luke Daniel Emery	371	27.8	N/A
Green	Derek Tatton	301	22.6	+0.2
Independent	Mark Hall	218	16.4	N/A
Turnout		1,333	29.4	
Independent hold		Swing		
Conservative hold		Swing		
Conservative hold		Swing		

=== Cheddleton ===
Cheddleton
Party	Candidate	Votes	%	±%
Conservative	Mike Worthington*	607	41.2	−1.8
Labour	Dylan Pascall	526	35.7	+0.2
Conservative	Oliver Pointon	507	34.4	−9.5
Conservative	Andrea Grocott	461	31.3	−11.5
Labour	Eddie Sabir	418	28.4	−1.9
Independent	Michael Thomas Bowen*	364	24.7	−19.2
Green	Dan Mayers	246	16.7	N/A
Independent	Harold Jennings	194	13.2	N/A
Independent	Keith Harvey	168	11.4	N/A
Liberal Democrats	Judy Gregg	162	11.0	−9.2
Independent	Ferenc Kari	116	7.9	N/A
Turnout		1,472	33.9	
Conservative hold		Swing		
Labour gain from Conservative		Swing		
Conservative hold		Swing		

Michael Bowen had been elected as a Conservative in 2019 but left the party in May 2022 to sit as an independent. Seat shown as independent loss to allow comparison with 2019 results.

=== Churnet ===
Churnet
Party	Candidate	Votes	%	±%
Conservative	James Aberley*	505	62.3	+13.3
Conservative	Elsie Fallows*	475	58.6	+6.0
Labour	Hugh Gerald Thomas Black	257	31.7	+13.0
Reform	Warwick Alexander McKenzie	135	16.6	N/A
Turnout		811	30.8	
Conservative hold		Swing		
Conservative hold		Swing		

=== Dane ===
Dane
Party	Candidate	Votes	%	±%
Conservative	Callum George Beswick	295	63.3	−4.8
Green	Alison Rosemary McCrea	171	36.7	+4.8
Turnout		474	35.5	
Conservative hold		Swing		

=== Forsbrook ===
Forsbrook
Party	Candidate	Votes	%	±%
Conservative	Tony Holmes*	589	49.8	−10.3
Conservative	Marc Durose	497	42.0	−7.1
Conservative	Ian Herdman*	495	41.9	−13.5
Labour	Paul Thomas Powner	437	37.0	−10.4
Independent	Abigail Wilkinson	402	34.0	N/A
Green	Helen Stead	372	31.5	N/A
Turnout		1,182	28.0	
Conservative hold		Swing		
Conservative hold		Swing		
Conservative hold		Swing		

=== Hamps Valley ===
Hamps Valley
Party	Candidate	Votes	%	±%
Conservative	Edwin Wain*	332	64.6	−20.1
Green	Wendy Bohme	182	35.4	N/A
Turnout		514	35.9	
Conservative hold		Swing		

=== Horton ===
Horton
Party	Candidate	Votes	%	±%
Conservative	Jo Cox	324	54.3	+29.5
Green	Dominic Cooney	273	45.7	N/A
Turnout		597	40.1	
Conservative gain from Independent		Swing		

=== Ipstones ===
Ipstones
Party	Candidate	Votes	%	±%
Independent	Linda Ann Malyon*	Uncontested	100.0	
Independent hold		Swing		

=== Leek East ===
Leek East
Party	Candidate	Votes	%	±%
Labour	Darren Price*	766	57.7	+22.0
Labour	Crecy Janina Christian Boone	681	51.3	+21.0
Labour	Gareth Richard Taylor	591	44.5	N/A
Conservative	Paul Chauveau	476	35.9	+12.2
Conservative	Andy Machin	442	33.3	N/A
Conservative	Brian Johnson*	436	32.9	−1.8
Green	Mike Jones	278	20.9	N/A
Turnout		1,327	32.8	
Labour hold		Swing		
Labour gain from Independent		Swing		
Labour gain from Independent		Swing		

Brian Johnson had been elected as an independent in 2019 but joined the Conservatives in May 2022. Seat shown as independent loss to allow comparison with 2019 results.

=== Leek North ===
Leek North
Party	Candidate	Votes	%	±%
Labour	Charlotte Atkins*	742	73.2	+11.0
Labour	Lyn Swindlehurst*	673	66.4	+19.8
Labour	Mark David Johnson	633	62.4	+18.5
Conservative	Charlotte Lockett	297	29.3	−1.4
Independent	Ferenc Kari	116	11.4	N/A
Turnout		1,014	24.5	
Labour hold		Swing		
Labour hold		Swing		
Labour hold		Swing		

=== Leek South ===
Leek South
Party	Candidate	Votes	%	±%
Labour	Matt Swindlehurst	880	66.4	+20.0
Labour	Mike Gledhill*	801	60.4	+5.5
Labour	Keith Hoptroff*	794	59.9	+19.1
Green	Daniella Vickerstaff	375	28.3	+3.4
Conservative	Neil David Cox	357	26.9	−4.6
Turnout		1,326	29.9	
Labour hold		Swing		
Labour hold		Swing		
Labour hold		Swing		

=== Leek West ===
Leek West
Party	Candidate	Votes	%	±%
Labour	Bill Cawley*	802	62.4	+9.4
Labour	Philip Barks	688	53.5	+11.9
Conservative	Ben Emery*	572	44.5	+0.6
Labour	Charlie Bromilow	564	43.9	N/A
Conservative	Neal Robert Podmore	490	38.1	+1.4
Turnout		1,286	35.2	
Labour hold		Swing		
Labour hold		Swing		
Conservative hold		Swing		

=== Manifold ===
Manifold
Party	Candidate	Votes	%	±%
Green	Jonathan Paul Kempster	306	52.7	N/A
Conservative	Stephen Wales	275	47.3	−17.4
Turnout		581	39.6	
Green gain from Conservative		Swing		

=== Werrington ===
Werrington
Party	Candidate	Votes	%	±%
Conservative	David Shaw*	404	56.3	−6.8
Conservative	Ross Ward*	370	51.6	−6.4
Independent	Nigel Michael Meakin	262	36.5	N/A
Green	Andrew Sharrock	246	34.3	−4.7
Turnout		717	27.3	
Conservative hold		Swing		
Conservative hold		Swing		

== Changes 2023–2027 ==
=== Cheddleton by-election ===
Cheddleton by-election: 12 November 2026 Resignation of Dyland Pascall (Labour)
Party	Candidate	Votes	%	±%
Reform	Su Beardmore	471	37.8	N/A
Conservative	Rob Bateman	327	26.3	−5.6
Labour	Martin Sadler	213	17.1	−10.5
Independent	Sue Rogers	156	12.5	N/A
Restore	Karen Pickering	55	4.4	N/A
Green	Matthew Frith	23	1.8	−11.1
Majority		144	11.5	N/A
Turnout		1245	29.2	−4.7
Reform gain from Labour		Swing		
