= Morridge =

Moorland in Staffordshire, England

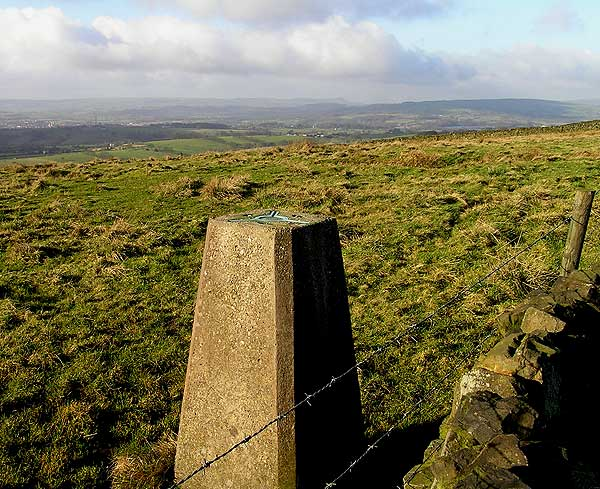
Looking north-west from a trig point on Morridge, at 53°5′43″N 1°57′25″W, grid reference SK 030 553, height 400 metres (1,300 ft).

Morridge is a geographical feature, a few mile east of Leek, in Staffordshire, England. It is in the local government district of Staffordshire Moorlands.

It is a long ridge of high moorland. The northern end, Morridge Top, is about a mile south of Flash. A few miles south at Merryton Low, near Upper Hulme, there is a trig point at height 489 metres (1,604 ft). The southern end of Morridge is at Onecote and Bradnop.

Morridge was pasture land in medieval times, and dairy and sheep farming still predominates. During the 16th and 17th centuries, Sir Edward Aston, his son Walter, 1st Lord Aston and his son Walter, 2nd Lord Aston attempted large-scale enclosure of Morridge. Local freeholders resisted this, and much of Morridge remained open. Full-scale enclosure first took place in 1769.

Morridge is crossed by the Peak District Boundary Walk by the former Mermaid Inn.
