= Ball Haye Green =

Suburb of Leek in Staffordshire, England

Coordinates: 53.110929°N 2.017744°W

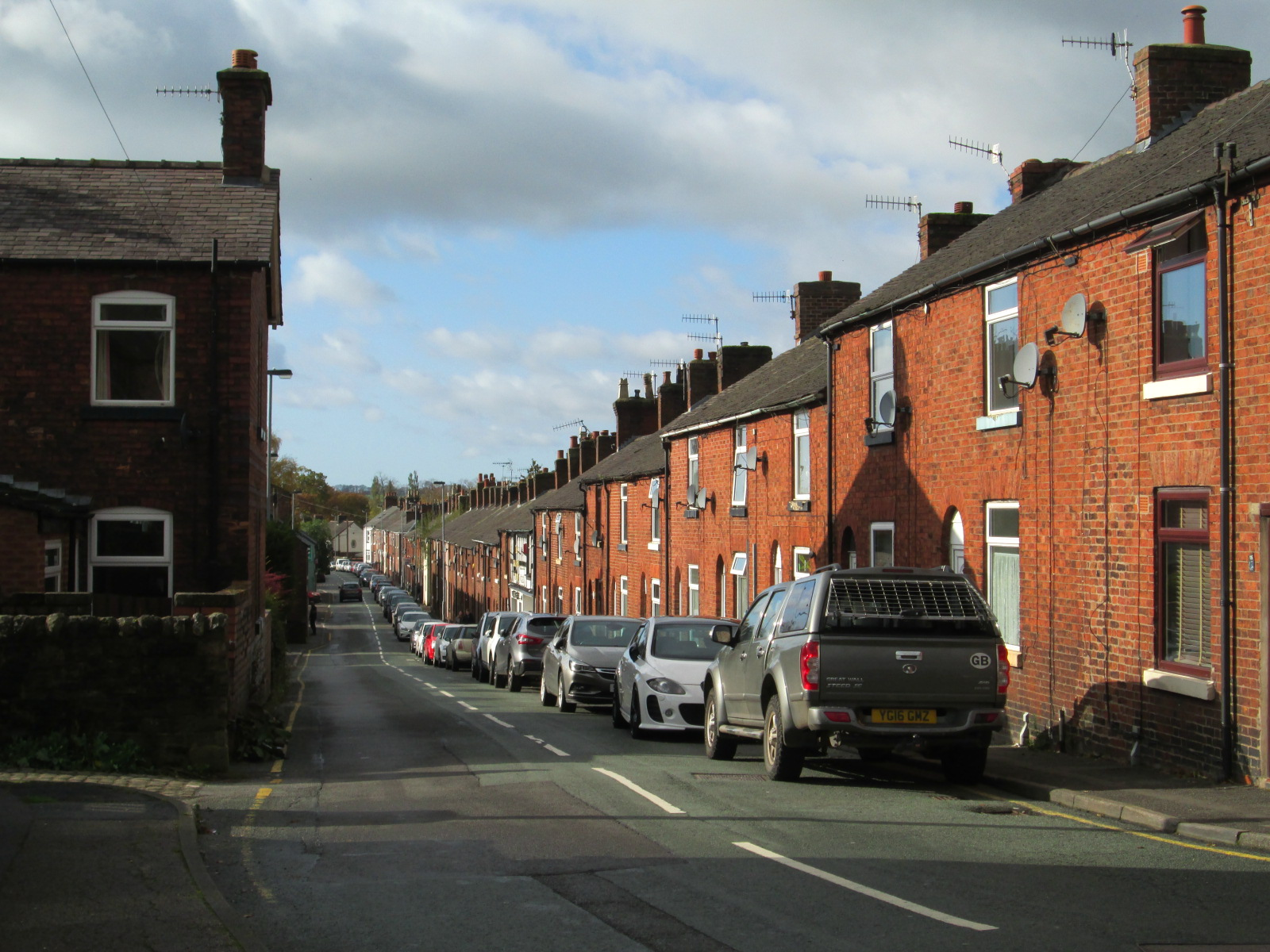
- Ball Haye Green, looking south-west

- Location within Staffordshire
- OS grid reference: SJ989570
- Civil parish: Leek
- District: Staffordshire Moorlands
- Shire county: Staffordshire
- Region: West Midlands
- Country: England
- Sovereign state: United Kingdom
- Post town: Leek
- Postcode district: ST13
- Police: Staffordshire
- Fire: Staffordshire
- Ambulance: West Midlands
- UK Parliament: Staffordshire Moorlands

Ball Haye Green is a suburb of Leek in the Staffordshire Moorlands district of the county of Staffordshire, England.

== History ==
The area was historically an estate in the township of Tittesworth.

== Development ==
It was developed as a suburb of Leek from the 1820s, when the Leek Building Society erected 42 houses between 1824 and 1829.

The suburb was expanded in the 20th century with the construction of housing estates.

== Transport ==
The area is served by regular bus services between Leek and Macclesfield.
