= Three Shire Heads =

Point where Cheshire, Derbyshire and Staffordshire meet

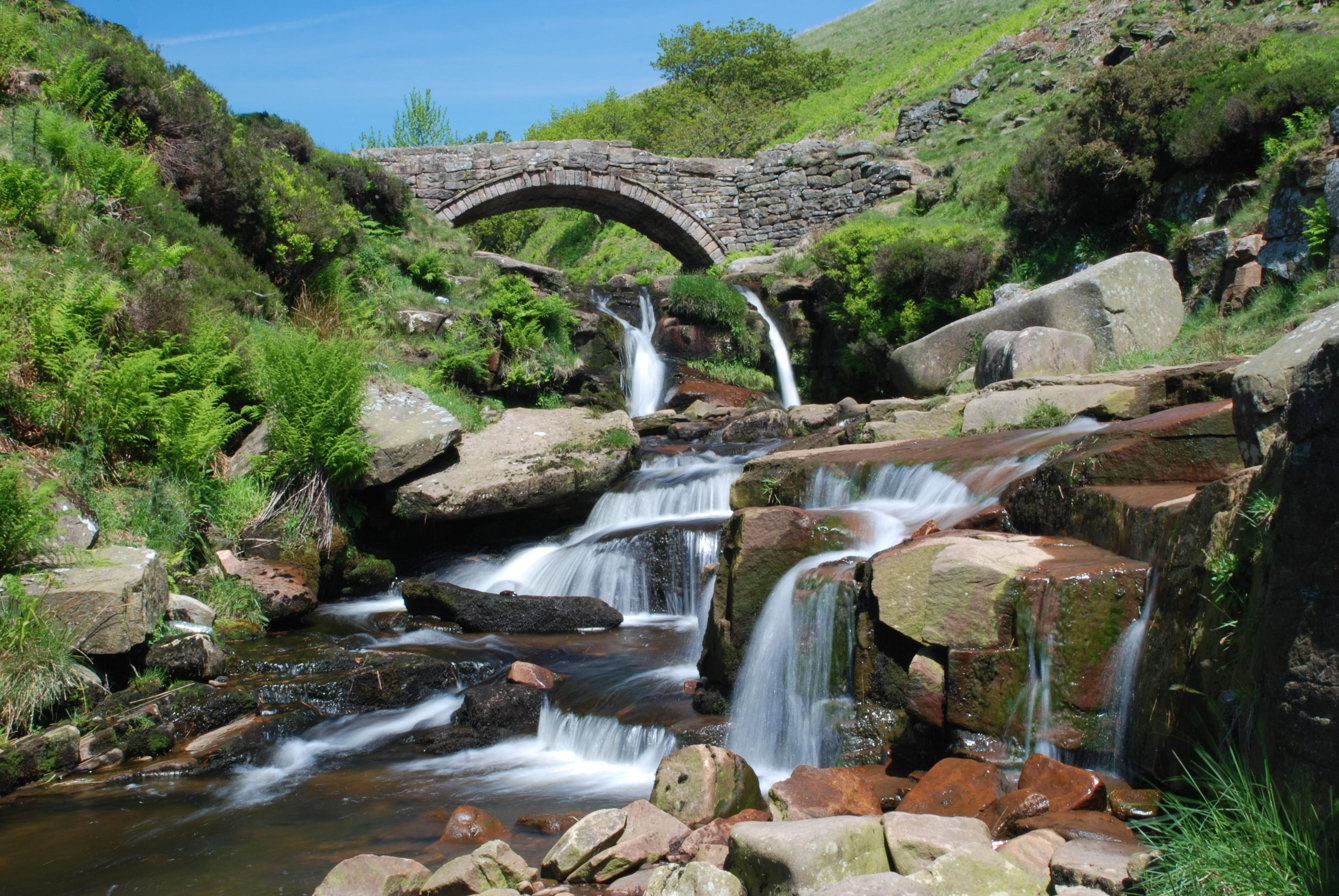
- River Dane and packhorse bridge at Three Shire Heads

- Location within Staffordshire
- OS grid reference: SK009685
- District: Staffordshire Moorlands
- Shire county: Staffordshire
- Region: West Midlands
- Country: England
- Sovereign state: United Kingdom

Three Shire Heads (also known as Three Shires Head) is the tripoint on Axe Edge Moor where Cheshire, Derbyshire and Staffordshire meet, at UK grid reference SK009685, or 53.213°N 1.987°W.

It is on the River Dane, which marks the Cheshire border in this area. On the east of the river, the border between Staffordshire and Derbyshire runs north-east for about a mile to Cheeks Hill, on the higher regions of Axe Edge Moor. From Cheeks Hill the border runs south then east to the head of the River Dove.

The main landmark is a packhorse bridge. The bridge is Grade II-listed, and was probably constructed in the late 18th century.

== Access ==
Access to Three Shire Heads is shared by motorcyclists, cyclists, riders on horseback and pedestrians. The route is often narrow and rocky with steep drop-offs and specially adapted motorcycles for greenlaning access the route regularly. There is no nearby parking provision.

== Significance ==
In modern times, Three Shire Heads is a landmark on various walking routes in this part of the moorlands.

The packhorse bridge and the waterfalls as the River Dane flows southwards are very picturesque, and frequently feature on calendars.

A report shows that this moorland area is of interest for its population of moths and butterflies.

The presence of the packhorse bridge shows the importance of this route for traders from nearby Flash and Hollinsclough to Macclesfield. Silk was produced at Hollinsclough, and sent to the mills at Macclesfield. Coal was mined from about 1600 on Axe Edge.

== Swimming ==
Three Shire Heads is well known for its free swimming, although the pools are cold. The depth varies depending on the time of year: the main pool can be up to 7 feet (2.1 m) deep.
