= Listed buildings in Quarnford =

Quarnford is a civil parish in the district of Staffordshire Moorlands, Staffordshire, England. It contains eight listed buildings that are recorded in the National Heritage List for England. All the listed buildings are designated at Grade II, the lowest of the three grades, which is applied to "buildings of national importance and special interest". Apart from the village of Flash, the parish is rural. The listed buildings consist of a church with memorials in the churchyard, a former chapel, a farmhouse, and a former shepherd's hut.

== Buildings ==
Name and location	Photograph	Date	Notes
Manor Farmhouse; 53.19355°N 1.99873°W	—	1739	The farmhouse was refaced at the rear in the 19th century. It is in painted stone and has a blue tile roof with verge parapets. There are two storeys, five bays, and a single-storey wing to the right. Above the doorway is a hood mould, and the windows are sashes, one with a dated lintel.
Cope Memorial; 53.20177°N 1.96276°W	—	c. 1745	The memorial is in the churchyard of St Paul's Church, and is to the memory of members of the Cope family. It is a chest tomb in stone, and has low panelled slab sides, a large moulded cornice, and an inscribed slab top with a moulded edge.
Sniddles; 53.18985°N 1.99246°W	—	Late 18th century	A former shepherd's hut, it is in stone with quoins, and a slate roof. There are two storeys and one bay. In the ground floor is a square opening with a smaller square opening above. In the right gable end is a doorway with a stone lintel.
Tunnicliff Memorial and enclosure 53.20181°N 1.96255°W	—	Late 18th century	The memorial is in the churchyard of St Paul's Church, and is a chest tomb in stone. It is on a plinth, and has reeded pilastered angles with fleuron capitals, a slab with a moulded edge, and inscribed panels. The tomb is enclosed by cast iron railings on a stone plinth.
Redfern Memorial; 53.20159°N 1.96314°W	—	1799	The memorial is in the churchyard of St Paul's Church, and is to the memory of James Refern. It is a chest tomb in stone, and has inset pilasters with carved panels, a fluted frieze and a moulded slab top. On the sides are panels with fluted fan motifs in the corners.
Wesleyan Chapel; 53.20178°N 1.96439°W	—	1821	A chapel, later a private house, it is in stone with quoins and a hipped blue tile roof. There are three storeys and a front of three bays, with paired flights of steps leading up to the central entrance in the middle floor. Above the door is a carved, painted and inscribed plaque with pilasters and a Tudor arch. In the ground floor are casement windows, and the upper floors contain sash windows.
Beswick Memorial; 53.20170°N 1.96283°W	—	1857	The memorial is in the churchyard of St Paul's Church, and is to the memory of James Derby Beswick. It is a chest tomb in stone, and has pilasters at the angles, a string course with acanthus consoles, and patera above. On the sides are oval raised and inscribed panels, and the top slab is moulded.
St Paul's Church; 53.20186°N 1.96274°W		1901	The church is built in stone with a red tile roof. It consists of a nave, north and south transepts, a chancel, and a west tower. The tower has three stages, angle buttresses, and a parapet ramped at the corners. In the transepts are circular windows, and the east window has five lights. The church was rebuilt in 1901 to the design by Buxton architect William Radford Bryden.
