= Listed buildings in Onecote =

District in England

Onecote is a civil parish in the district of Staffordshire Moorlands, Staffordshire, England. It contains twelve listed buildings that are recorded in the National Heritage List for England. All the listed buildings are designated at Grade II, the lowest of the three grades, which is applied to "buildings of national importance and special interest". The parish contains the village of Onecote, and is otherwise rural. Most of the listed buildings are farmhouses and farm buildings, and the other listed buildings include a church and a memorial in the churchyard, a bridge, a public house, and a milepost.

== Buildings ==
Name and location	Photograph	Date	Notes
Waterhouse Farmhouse; 53.10000°N 1.94651°W	—	1639	The farmhouse is in stone with quoins, and a tile roof with coped verges on kneelers. There are two storeys and an attic, and an L-shaped plan, with a main rang, a kitchen wing at the rear, and a porch in the angle. The windows have chamfered mullions, and on the gable is a ball finial. Inside, there are two large inglenook fireplaces.
Banktop; 53.08320°N 1.90876°W	—	17th century	The farmhouse, which was extended in the 19th century, is in stone, and has a tile roof with coped verges on kneelers. There are two storeys, three bays, and a later lower extension to the right. The doorway has a hood mould, the windows have mullions, and those in the ground floor have hood moulds, and in the extension is a casement window.
Chapel House; 53.09338°N 1.92876°W	—	18th century (probable)	A stone cottage with quoins, and a tile roof with coped verges. There is one storey and an attic, two bays, a single-storey lean-to on the right, and a garage lean-to on the left, In the centre is a doorway, with a four-light mullioned and transomed stair window to the left, and a two-light mullioned window to the right.
Onecote Lane End Farmhouse; 53.09571°N 1.93540°W	—	18th century (probable)	The farmhouse, which was extended in the 19th century, is in gritstone, and has a tile roof with moulded coped verges. There are two storeys and a T-shaped plan, consisting of a main range of two bays, a lower single-bay extension to the left, and a rear wing. Above the doorway is a cornice and an inscribed tablet with a moulded surround, the windows are mullioned, and above the ground floor is a continuous hood mould that is raised over the doorway.
Cowhouse and Barn, Lane End Farm; 53.09556°N 1.93632°W	—	18th century (probable)	The farm building is in stone with quoins, and a tile roof with coped verges. It consists of a threshing floor at the north end, a cowhouse with a loft above at the south end, and at both ends are lean-to extensions. The building contains two doorways and two windows, one of which has been inserted into a blocked barn doorway that has a segmental arch and a hood mould.
St Luke's Church; 53.09363°N 1.92902°W		1753–55	The church is in stone with a tile roof, and consists of a nave, a south porch, a chancel, and a west tower. The tower has three stages, a west window, and an embattled parapet. The windows in the nave have round heads and raised keystones, and at the east end is a Venetian window.
Lower Green Farmhouse; 53.12518°N 1.93377°W	—	1773	The farmhouse is in sandstone with quoins and coped gables. There are two storeys and an attic, a double-depth plan, and a symmetrical front of three bays. The windows and doorway have quoined surrounds, and the central doorway has a fanlight. The windows are mullioned, above the doorway is a dated and inscribed plaque, and over that is a glazed oculus. At the rear is a four-stage stair window.
Farm outbuilding west of Lower Green Farmhouse; 53.12518°N 1.93403°W	—	18th century (probable)	The building is in sandstone with quoins and a blue tile roof. There is one storey and a loft, three bays, and a lean-to at each end. The building has three doorways with quoined surrounds, and two loft openings, one with a quoined surround. At the west end are external steps.
Bridge north of Jervis Arms public house 53.09413°N 1.92625°W	—	Early 19th century	The bridge carries the B5053 road over the River Hamps. It is in stone and consists of a single semi-elliptical arch. The bridge has a parapet band and a plain parapet.
The Mermaid Inn; 53.14123°N 1.94627°W		Early 19th century	A private house, later a public house, it is in gritstone with quoins, a sill band, and a tile roof with coped verges. There are two storeys and a U-shaped plan, consisting of a three-bay central range, and long flanking gabled wings. In the centre is a porch with a hipped roof, and in the gable ends are square shuttered openings. The windows are mullioned and contain sashes.
Joseph Booth Memorial; 53.09364°N 1.92877°W	—	1830	The memorial is in the churchyard of St Luke's Church. It is a chest tomb in stone, and has side panels with fluted corner fans and a central oval fleuron, fluted corner pilasters with console brackets, and a moulded base and cornice. The tomb is surrounded by cast iron railings.
Milepost south of Wetley Lane; 53.08269°N 1.93381°W	—	19th century	The milepost is on the west side of the B5053 road. It is in cast iron and has a triangular plan and a sloping top. On the top is "ONECOTE" and on the sides are the distances to Onecote, Warslow, Longnor, Buxton, Ipstones, Froghall, Leek, and Cheadle.
