= Onecote =

Village in Staffordshire, England

Coordinates: 53.0931°N 1.9273°W

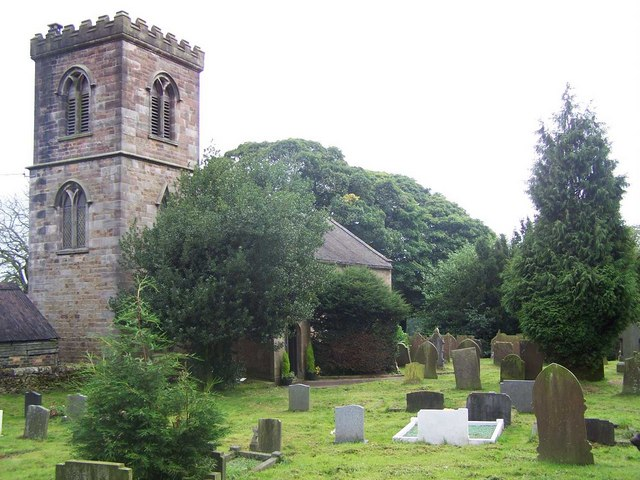
- St Luke's Church, Onecote

- Location within Staffordshire
- Population: 211 (2021 Census)
- OS grid reference: SK 050 550
- Civil parish: Onecote
- District: Staffordshire Moorlands
- Shire county: Staffordshire
- Region: West Midlands
- Country: England
- Sovereign state: United Kingdom
- Post town: Leek
- Postcode district: ST13
- Police: Staffordshire
- Fire: Staffordshire
- Ambulance: West Midlands
- UK Parliament: Staffordshire Moorlands

Onecote is a village and civil parish on the B5053 road, near Leek, in the Staffordshire Moorlands district, in the county of Staffordshire, England. The population as taken at the 2021 census was 211. The Peak District Boundary Walk runs through the village.

The civil parish has an irregular western boundary with those of Bradnop and Tittesworth. Most of the eastern boundary is defined by the River Hamps. The villages of Onecote and Bradnop lie at the southern end of Morridge, a long ridge of high moorland. The land lies at 245 metres (804 ft) at the southern tip of the civil parish, and 489 metres (1,604 ft) at the northern end at Merryton Low.

== Details ==
=== Early history ===
The first mention of the name Onecote is in 1199. Croxden Abbey had by 1223 a grange at the confluence of the Hamps and Onecote Brook, probably the location of the original settlement, near the present village. After the dissolution of the monasteries, the abbey's estate in Onecote was granted in 1543 to Sir Edward Aston of Tixall.

=== Church of St Luke ===
The parish church of St Luke was built in 1753–55. At that time it served a chapelry for the townships of Bradnop and Onecote, which became a parish in 1862. Originally the church consisted of a single cell with a wooden bellcote. A chancel was added in 1837, which has a Venetian east window. There is a west tower, and a porch in the south-west. It is a Grade II listed building.

=== Mermaid Inn ===
The former Mermaid Inn, near the northern end of the civil parish, dates from the early 19th century; it is a U-shaped building of gritstone rubble with ashlar dressings. It is listed Grade II. It was a rebuilding of an earlier building on a nearby site, Blakemere House, existing by 1638. The Mermaid Inn had acquired its name by 1863, due to a legend that a mermaid inhabited a nearby pool lying to the north in Heathylee.

=== Merryton Low ===
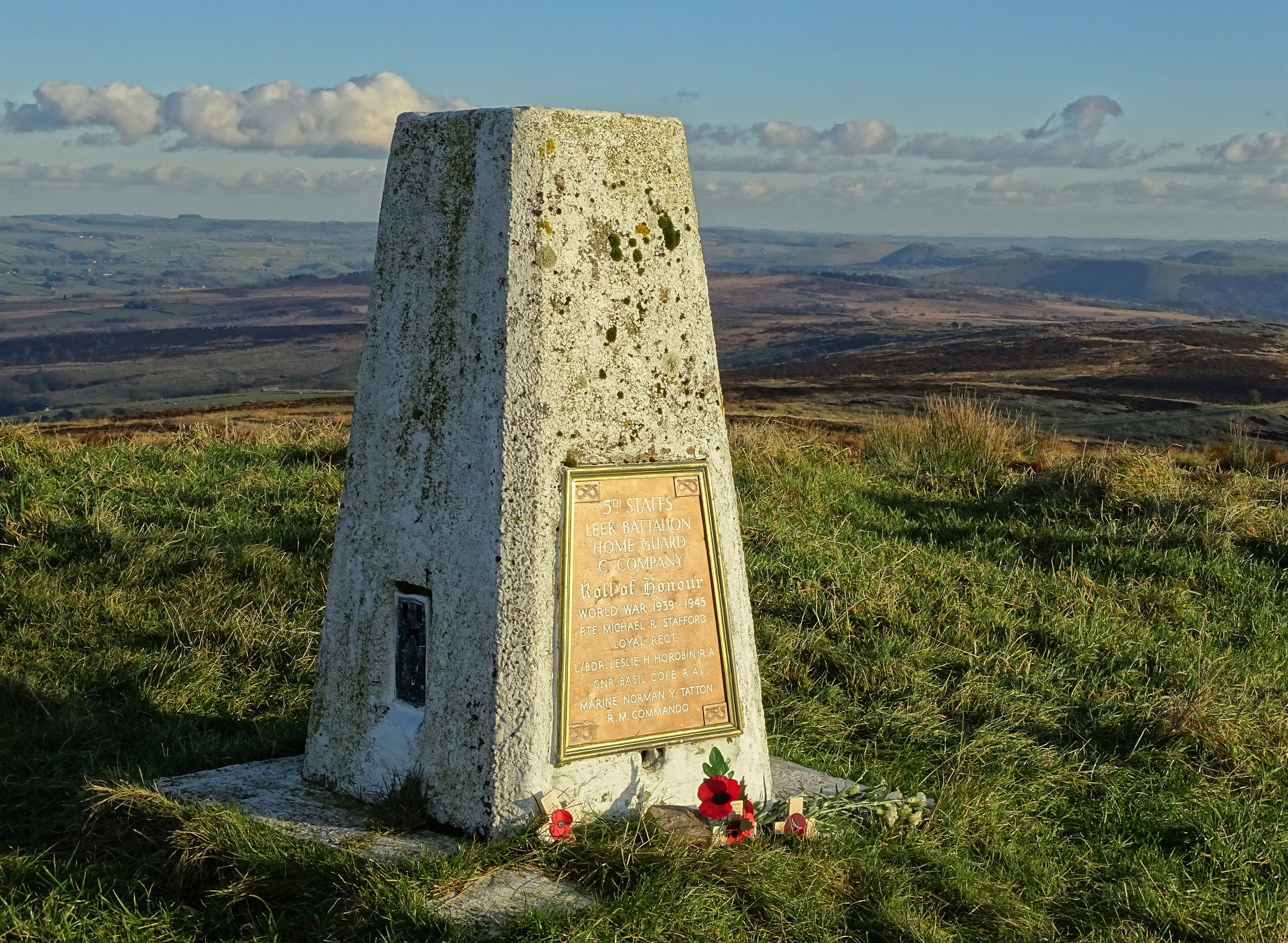
The triangulation pillar and plaque attached

There is a bowl barrow on the southern edge of the crest of Merryton Low Hill, at the north-east corner of the civil parish. It is oval, about 18 by 13 metres (59 by 43 ft), and about 0.7 metres (2 ft 4 in) high. It is thought to be unexcavated. It is a scheduled monument.

Near to the bowl barrow is a triangulation pillar erected in 1936, bearing a bronze plaque, a memorial to four members of the Home Guard in Leek, who went on to serve with the armed forces and were killed in action. It was placed there in 1946. The memorial is Grade II listed. The surrounding moorland was used for training during the Second World War by the regular army and the Home Guard.

=== Lane End Farm and Bleak House ===
Lane End Farmhouse, near the village, is a Grade II listed building, probably dating from the 18th century. A dispute in the 1840s among members of the Cook family who lived at the farm was the source of an element in Charles Dickens's novel Bleak House. A Chancery suit was begun by Thomas Cook in 1844, which made little progress after four years, meanwhile incurring costs exceeding the original amount involved. A Leek solicitor involved with the case published a pamphlet, describing to the case, without naming the parties, and urging Chancery reform. He sent a copy to Dickens; the details, little altered, appear in chapter XV of the novel.

== See also ==
- Listed buildings in Onecote
