= Listed buildings in Bradnop =

Bradnop is a civil parish in the district of Staffordshire Moorlands, Staffordshire, England. It contains nine listed buildings that are recorded in the National Heritage List for England. All the listed buildings are designated at Grade II, the lowest of the three grades, which is applied to "buildings of national importance and special interest". The parish contains the village of Bradnop and the surrounding area. The listed buildings consist of farmhouses, a pair of cottages, a cross, a well, a pair of entrance piers, and two mileposts.

== Buildings ==
Name and location	Photograph	Date	Notes
Sytch Farmhouse; 53.09490°N 1.98397°W	—	Late 16th century	The farmhouse, which was altered later, has a timber framed core with cruck construction. The external walls are in gritstone, and the roof has blue tiles and verge parapets. There are two storeys and three bays, and the windows are top-hung 20th-century casements. Inside the house is at least one cruck frame.
Cross east of Stile House Farmhouse; 53.10716°N 1.97401°W		Early 17th century	The cross is in gritstone and is about 3.2 metres (10 ft) high. It has an octagonal base and a circular plinth of two steps, on which is a tapering octagonal shaft with a dowelled head, but the cross is missing. The cross is also a scheduled monument.
Buckley Farmhouse and farm buildings 53.09527°N 1.98334°W	—	17th century	The farmhouse is in painted rendered stone. with a coved eaves band and a blue tile roof. There are two storeys and two bays. In the centre is a gabled porch, and the windows are three-light mullioned casements. The farm buildings attached to the left are in unrendered stone, and have two storeys and three bays. Inside the house is a timber framed partition.
Stile House Farmhouse; 53.10500°N 1.98475°W	—	Late 17th century	The farmhouse, which was extended in the 19th century, is in gritstone, and has a blue tile roof with verge parapets on corbelled kneelers. There are two storeys and five bays. Above the central doorway is an octagonal window, and the other windows are three-light casements with mullions.
The Egg Well; 53.08360°N 1.99305°W	—	Late 17th or early 18th century	The well is surrounded by a rectangular 20th-century brick enclosure with stone slabs, and two steps lead down to the oval-shaped well opening, Inside the well opening is incised scrollwork, and at the back of the enclosure is an inscription. The well is also a scheduled monument.
School Cottages; 53.09460°N 1.98363°W	—	1750	A pair of cottages in gritstone with a blue tile roof. There are two storeys, each cottage has one bay, there is a lower bay to the left, and a lean-to on the right. The windows are casements, and there is a datestone between the doorways.
Entrance piers to Ashenhurst; 53.08495°N 1.99646°W	—	Mid 19th century	The piers at the entrance to the drive are in sandstone, they are in Baroque style, about 4 metres (13 ft) high, and have a cruciform plan. At the base of each pier is a moulded plinth, above which are chamfered panels, and a moulded string course with strapwork panels. At the top is a moulded surbase and a ball finial.
Milepost south of Cooks Lane; 53.08437°N 1.97196°W		Late 19th century	The milepost is on the southwest side of the A523 road. It is in cast iron, it is about 700 millimetres (28 in) high, and consists of a circular shaft with an enlarged head. On the head are the distances to Leek and Ashbourne, and on the shaft is the distance to London.
Milepost Leek 4 miles 53.07676°N 1.95161°W		Late 19th century	The milepost is on the southwest side of the A523 road. It is in cast iron, it is about 700 millimetres (28 in) high, and consists of a circular shaft with an enlarged head. On the head are the distances to Leek and Ashbourne, and on the shaft is the distance to London.
