= Sengal Dhora =

Hindu temple in Rajasthan, India

- सेंगाल धोरा
- Location in Rajasthan Sengal Dhora (India)

Religion
- Affiliation: Hinduism
- District: Bikaner
- Deity: Shivaji, Pabuji, Roopnathji, Gorakhnath ji
- Festival: Maha Shivaratri

Location
- Location: Sengal Dhora, kakkoo, Nokha
- State: Rajasthan
- Country: India
- Interactive map of Sengal Dhora
- Coordinates: 27°26′47.3″N 73°16′51″E

Sengal Dhora (सेंगाल धोरा) or Senghal Dhora, where सेंगाल means hundred cheeks or hundred "Dhora", is a Shiva temple at a height of 320 feet amidst hundred sand dunes, which is also known as the Taposthali of Guru Gaurathnath. There is also a smoke here which has been alive for years. The speciality of this temple is that the location, height and number of dhoras around the temple keep changing every time.

It is situated between kakkoo and panchu about 28Km from Nokha

== Description ==
To perform Abhishek in Shivalaya, one has to register first because thousands of Shiva devotees reach here every weekend and Monday. Every month, two Sahastra Ghatabhishek and five Rudrabhishek with milk are performed in the temple. In Rudrabhishek, only milk from the cowshed of the temple is used. Spread over 10 bighas, this temple has a cave near the Shivalaya which is as long as the temple.

Apart from sages and mahatmas, common people are not allowed to enter this cave which is about 40 feet deep. For the last several years, viewing of this cave has been allowed only from a distance. Thousands of devotees from all over the country reach here on Sawan, Mahashivratri and Navratri.

Here are these statues and mausoleums: There are temples of Guru Gorakhnath, Roopnathji and Pabuji. Apart from this, 25–30 idols have been consecrated, including the idols of Radha-Krishna, Ganeshji, Vishvakarmaji Durgamata, Kaal Bhairav, Santosh Giri Maharaj, Sefaraj Maharaj etc. Pandit Chandrabhan Shastri, who studied in the Gurukul of the temple, tells that there is a temple of Rupnathji Maharaj here. The same Rupnathji is known as Baba Balak Nath Himachal Pradesh.

An effigy was found during the reconstruction of the temple: There is also an effigy of King Vikramaditya of Ujjain in the temple. It is included among the 32 statues on which Emperor Vikramaditya used to sit and administer justice. Mahant Padmagiri Maharaj of the temple tells that till 1992 the temple of Sengal Dhora was built only in 10 by 10 feet. Reconstruction was done in 1993. During the excavation during the renovation of the temple, this effigy was found carved in the ground.
