= Quarnford =

Coordinates: 53°12′10″N 1°57′47″W

- Location within Staffordshire
- Population: 242 (2011 Census)
- Civil parish: Quarnford
- District: Staffordshire Moorlands
- Shire county: Staffordshire
- Region: West Midlands
- Country: England
- Sovereign state: United Kingdom
- Post town: Buxton
- Postcode district: SK17
- Police: Staffordshire
- Fire: Staffordshire
- Ambulance: West Midlands
- UK Parliament: Staffordshire Moorlands

Quarnford is a village and civil parish in the Staffordshire Moorlands district of Staffordshire, England. According to the 2001 census it had a population of 244, reducing marginally to 242 at the 2011 census. The village is in the Peak District, between Buxton and Leek.

The village (as opposed to the parish) is known by the name "Flash" and is the highest village in Britain, being some 1518 ft above sea level. The local church of St. Paul's was built starting in 1743, its graveyard contains graves dating back to at least 1791.

Although the village historically was almost an outpost due to its relative isolation and small economic significance, it is situated in some of the most picturesque and unspoilt areas of the English countryside.

== See also ==
- Listed buildings in Quarnford
