= 2019 Staffordshire Moorlands District Council election =

2019 UK local government election

- 2 May 2019

All 56 seats to Staffordshire Moorlands District Council 29 seats needed for a majority

	First party	Second party
Party	Conservative	Independent
Last election	35 seats, 40.1%	10 seats, 13.9%
Seats won	25	17
Seat change	▼10	▲7
Popular vote	17,122	13,448
Percentage	36.2%	28.5%
Swing	▼3.9%	▲14.6%
	Third party	Fourth party
Party	Labour	Liberal Democrats
Last election	13 seats, 24.6%	2 seats, 4.7%
Seats won	13	1
Seat change	▲6	▼1
Popular vote	12,282	1,969
Percentage	26.0%	4.2%
Swing	▲1.4%	▼0.5%
- Winner of each seat at the 2019 Staffordshire Moorlands District Council election
Council control before election
Conservative
Council control after election
No overall control

The 2019 Staffordshire Moorlands District Council election took place on 2 May 2019 to elect members of Staffordshire Moorlands District Council in England. This was on the same day as other local elections.

== Results summary ==
=== Election result ===
2019 Staffordshire Moorlands District Council election
Party	Candidates	Seats	Gains	Losses	Net gain/loss	Seats %	Votes %	Votes	+/−
Conservative	42	25	3	13	▼10	44.6	36.2	17,122	–3.9
Independent	32	17	9	2	▲7	30.4	28.5	13,448	+14.6
Labour	34	13	9	2	▲6	23.2	26.0	12,282	+1.4
Liberal Democrats	8	1	0	1	▼1	1.8	4.2	1,969	–0.5
Green	10	0	0	0	Steady	0.0	5.1	2,416	+1.9
UKIP	0	0	0	2	▼2	0.0	0.0	0	–3.3

== Ward results ==
=== Alton ===
Alton
Party	Candidate	Votes	%	±%
Conservative	Hayley Plimley	320	66.5	
Labour	Jennifer Lingham	161	33.5	
Majority		159	33.1	
Turnout		496	43.55	
Rejected ballots		15		
Registered electors		1,139		
Conservative hold		Swing		

=== Bagnall & Stanley ===
Bagnall & Stanley
Party	Candidate	Votes	%	±%
Conservative	Sybil Ralphs	421	70.8	
Green	Helen Stead	97	16.3	
Labour	Frances Naggs	77	12.9	
Majority		324	54.5	
Turnout		601	43.49	
Rejected ballots		6		
Registered electors		1,382		
Conservative hold		Swing		

=== Biddulph East ===
Biddulph East
Party	Candidate	Votes	%	±%
Labour	Jillian Salt	482	50.5	
Labour	Kevin Jackson	453	47.4	
Labour	Connor Brady	374	39.2	
Independent	Gerald Adams	341	35.7	
Independent	Christopher Perkin	328	34.3	
Independent	Alan Harper	199	20.8	
Conservative	Catharine Aberley	155	16.2	
Turnout		965	21.06	
Rejected ballots		10		
Registered electors		4,583		
Labour hold				
Labour hold				
Labour hold				

=== Biddulph Moor ===
Biddulph Moor
Party	Candidate	Votes	%	±%
Independent	John Jones	479	80.5	
Conservative	Pamela Gregory	85	14.3	
Labour	Robert Whilding	31	5.2	
Majority		394	66.2	
Turnout		597	42.92	
Rejected ballots		2		
Registered electors		1,391		
Independent hold		Swing		

=== Biddulph North ===
Biddulph North
Party	Candidate	Votes	%	±%
Independent	Derek Hall	885	64.6	
Independent	James Davies	878	64.1	
Independent	Harold Hart	795	58.0	
Labour	James Bostock	364	26.6	
Labour	Denver Johnson	304	22.2	
Green	Ian Waite	253	18.5	
Turnout		1,382	30.31	
Rejected ballots		12		
Registered electors		4,559		
Independent hold				
Independent hold				
Independent hold				

=== Biddulph South ===
Biddulph South
Party	Candidate	Votes	%	±%
Liberal Democrats	John Redfern	154	34.2	
Independent	Paul Barlow	144	32.0	
Labour	David Proudlove	89	19.8	
Conservative	Martin Graham	63	14.0	
Majority		10	2.2	
Turnout		458	32.67	
Rejected ballots		8		
Registered electors		1,402		
Liberal Democrats hold		Swing		

=== Biddulph West ===
Biddulph West
Party	Candidate	Votes	%	±%
Independent	Hilda Sheldon	873	72.0	
Labour	Nigel Yates	423	34.9	
Conservative	Ian Lawson	374	30.9	
Conservative	James McGuinness	325	26.8	
Conservative	Stefan Trbovic	179	14.8	
Turnout		1,231	29.76	
Rejected ballots		19		
Registered electors		4,137		
Independent hold				
Labour hold				
Conservative hold				

=== Brown Edge & Endon ===
Brown Edge & Endon
Party	Candidate	Votes	%	±%
Conservative	Linda Lea	653	48.4	
Conservative	Geoffrey Bond	558	41.4	
Conservative	Joseph Porter	551	40.8	
Liberal Democrats	Alwyne Adams	405	30.0	
Liberal Democrats	Mark Delf	310	23.0	
Labour	Andrew Church	271	20.1	
Green	Alison McCrea	269	19.9	
Labour	Lorraine Chapple	197	14.6	
Turnout		1,384	34.78	
Rejected ballots		35		
Registered electors		3,979		
Conservative hold				
Conservative hold				
Conservative gain from Liberal Democrats				

=== Caverswall ===
Caverswall
Party	Candidate	Votes	%	±%
Conservative	Paul Roberts	322	80.1	
Labour	Andrew Darrant	80	19.9	
Majority		242	60.2	
Turnout		415	28.74	
Rejected ballots		13		
Registered electors		1,444		
Conservative hold		Swing		

=== Cellarhead ===
Cellarhead
Party	Candidate	Votes	%	±%
Conservative	Anthony McNicol	389	58.4	
Conservative	Barbara Hughes	342	51.4	
Green	Andrew Sharrock	259	38.9	
Turnout		679	26.13	
Rejected ballots		13		
Registered electors		2,599		
Conservative hold				
Conservative hold				

=== Cheadle North East ===
Cheadle North East
Party	Candidate	Votes	%	±%
Independent	Ian Whitehouse	372	51.0	
Independent	Phillip Routledge	252	34.6	
Independent	Paulette Upton	175	24.0	
Independent	Julie Bull	158	21.7	
Labour	Martin Chadwick	125	17.1	
Independent	Alan Thomas	98	13.4	
Green	Rachel Fairbanks	65	8.9	
Turnout		746	26.44	
Rejected ballots		17		
Registered electors		2,821		
Independent gain from Conservative				
Independent gain from UKIP				

=== Cheadle South East ===
Cheadle South East
Party	Candidate	Votes	%	±%
Independent	Frederick Alcock	448	52.3	
Independent	Peter Elkin	304	35.5	
Independent	Abigail Wilkinson	247	28.9	
Labour	Adam Drane	225	26.3	
Conservative	David Newport	196	22.9	
Turnout		863	29.17	
Rejected ballots		7		
Registered electors		2,959		
Independent hold		Swing		
Independent gain from Conservative		Swing		

=== Cheadle West ===
Cheadle West
Party	Candidate	Votes	%	±%
Independent	Kate Martin	468	45.5	
Independent	Ian Plant	422	41.0	
Independent	Gary Bentley	397	38.6	
Independent	Ronald Locker	337	32.8	
Conservative	Stephen Ellis	334	32.5	
Conservative	Peter Jackson	251	24.4	
Conservative	Alan Banks	246	23.9	
Independent	Adam Lees	196	19.0	
Turnout		1,046	25.87	
Rejected ballots		17		
Registered electors		4,043		
Independent gain from Conservative				
Independent gain from Conservative				
Independent gain from Conservative				

=== Checkley ===
Checkley
Party	Candidate	Votes	%	±%
Conservative	Mark Deaville	664	48.5	
Independent	Peter Wilkinson	626	45.7	
Conservative	Alan Hulme	557	40.7	
Independent	Sandra Peck	389	28.4	
Conservative	Paul McCormack	382	27.9	
Green	James Firkins	307	22.4	
Labour	John Palfreyman	287	20.9	
Turnout		1,381	29.72	
Rejected ballots		11		
Registered electors		4,646		
Conservative hold				
Independent gain from Conservative				
Conservative hold				

=== Cheddleton ===
Cheddleton
Party	Candidate	Votes	%	±%
Conservative	Michael Bowen	640	43.9	
Conservative	Michael Worthington	627	43.0	
Conservative	Salvino Scalise	623	42.8	
Labour	Steven Proffitt	517	35.5	
Labour	Ian Dakin	441	30.3	
Labour	Mahfooz Ahmad	410	28.1	
Liberal Democrats	Geoffrey Preston	295	20.2	
Turnout		1,492	33.98	
Rejected ballots		35		
Registered electors		4,391		
Conservative hold				
Conservative hold				
Conservative hold				

=== Churnet ===
Churnet
Party	Candidate	Votes	%	±%
Conservative	Elsie Fallows	491	52.6	
Conservative	James Aberley	458	49.0	
Independent	Ivor Lucas	405	43.4	
Labour	Paul Powner	175	18.7	
Turnout		946	35.74	
Rejected ballots		12		
Registered electors		2,647		
Conservative gain from Independent				
Conservative hold				

=== Dane ===
Dane
Party	Candidate	Votes	%	±%
Conservative	Christine Heath	341	68.1	
Green	Michael Jones	160	31.9	
Majority		181	36.1	
Turnout		505	38.32	
Rejected ballots		4		
Registered electors		1,318		
Conservative hold		Swing		

=== Forsbrook ===
Forsbrook
Party	Candidate	Votes	%	±%
Conservative	Thomas Holmes	707	60.1	
Conservative	Ian Herdman	652	55.4	
Conservative	Keith Flunder	578	49.1	
Labour	Joanne Darrant	557	47.4	
Turnout		1,245	29.76	
Rejected ballots		69		
Registered electors		4,184		
Conservative hold				
Conservative hold				
Conservative gain from UKIP				

=== Hamps Valley ===
Hamps Valley
Party	Candidate	Votes	%	±%
Conservative	Edwin Wain	524	84.7	
Labour	Neil Singh	95	15.3	
Majority		429	69.3	
Turnout		629	42.70	
Rejected ballots		10		
Registered electors		1,473		
Conservative hold		Swing		

=== Horton ===
Horton
Party	Candidate	Votes	%	±%
Independent	Norma Hawkins	366	60.2	
Conservative	Robert Cooper	151	24.8	
Labour	Laura Robinson	91	15.0	
Majority		215	35.4	
Turnout		620	39.92	
Rejected ballots		12		
Registered electors		1,553		
Independent gain from Conservative		Swing		

=== Ipstones ===
Ipstones
Party	Candidate	Votes	%	±%
Independent	Linda Malyon	511	74.5	
Conservative	Daniel Newton	175	25.5	
Majority		336	49.0	
Turnout		693	44.97	
Rejected ballots		7		
Registered electors		1,541		
Independent hold		Swing		

=== Leek East ===
Leek East
Party	Candidate	Votes	%	±%
Independent	Pamela Wood	939	67.1	
Labour	Darren Price	500	35.7	
Independent	Brian Johnson	485	34.7	
Labour	Andrew Kidd	424	30.3	
Independent	Stephen Wales	388	27.7	
Conservative	Michael Howson	322	23.0	
Liberal Democrats	Roy Gregg	216	15.4	
Turnout		1,413	35.54	
Rejected ballots		14		
Registered electors		3,976		
Independent hold				
Labour gain from Conservative				
Independent gain from Conservative				

=== Leek North ===
Leek North
Party	Candidate	Votes	%	±%
Labour	Charlotte Atkins	731	62.2	
Labour	Lynda Swindlehurst	548	46.6	
Labour	Lytton Page	516	43.9	
Conservative	Danuta Ogden	384	32.7	
Independent	Charlotte Lockett	361	30.7	
Turnout		1,200	28.52	
Rejected ballots		25		
Registered electors		4,208		
Labour hold				
Labour hold				
Labour gain from Conservative				

=== Leek South ===
Leek South
Party	Candidate	Votes	%	±%
Labour	Michael Gledhill	775	54.9	
Labour	Susan Coleman	654	46.4	
Labour	Keith Hoptroff	575	40.8	
Conservative	Joanne Cox	445	31.5	
Green	Daniella Vickerstaff	352	24.9	
Liberal Democrats	Michael Ottewell	214	15.2	
Independent	Gail Lockett	182	12.9	
Turnout		1,437	32.01	
Rejected ballots		26		
Registered electors		4,489		
Labour hold				
Labour gain from Independent				
Labour gain from Conservative				

=== Leek West ===
Leek West
Party	Candidate	Votes	%	±%
Labour	William Cawley	714	53.0	
Conservative	Benedict Emery	591	43.9	
Labour	Philip Taylor	560	41.6	
Conservative	Neal Podmore	494	36.7	
Green	Mark Sidebotham	382	28.4	
Conservative	Roy Molson	351	26.1	
Liberal Democrats	Lee Jagger	235	17.4	
Turnout		1,367	36.78	
Rejected ballots		20		
Registered electors		3,717		
Labour gain from Conservative				
Conservative hold				
Labour gain from Conservative				

=== Manifold ===
Manifold
Party	Candidate	Votes	%	±%
Conservative	Teresa Riley	357	64.6	
Liberal Democrats	Claire Wolstencroft	140	25.3	
Labour	Jonathan Rowley	56	10.1	
Majority		217	39.2	
Turnout		571	38.40	
Rejected ballots		18		
Registered electors		1,487		
Conservative hold		Swing		

=== Werrington ===
Werrington
Party	Candidate	Votes	%	±%
Conservative	David Shaw	440	63.1	
Conservative	Ross Ward	404	58.0	
Green	Teresa Pattison	272	39.0	
Turnout		709	26.79	
Rejected ballots		12		
Registered electors		2,647		
Conservative hold				
Conservative hold				

== Changes 2019–2023 ==
- May 2022: Norma Hawkins, Brian Johnson and Phillip Routledge, all elected as independents, joined the Conservatives, while Michael Bowen, elected as a Conservative, left the party to sit as an independent. These changes gave the council an overall Conservative majority, having previously been under no overall control.

=== By-elections ===
==== Cheadle North East ====
The by-election was triggered by the death of independent councillor Ian Whitehouse on 30 November 2020.

Cheadle North East by-election, 6 May 2021
Party	Candidate	Votes	%	±%
Conservative	Stephen Ellis	308	47.2	
Independent	Elizabeth Whitehouse	163	25.0	
Labour	Debra Gratton	117	17.9	
Independent	Paulette Upton	33	5.1	
Green	Daniel Mayers	31	4.8	
Majority		145	22.2	
Turnout		655	23.4	
Rejected ballots		3		
Registered electors		2,790		
Conservative gain from Independent				

==== Cheadle South East (2021) ====
The by-election was triggered by independent councillor Peter Elkin leaving the council; the council had granted him a dispensation from attending meetings because of illness.

Cheadle South East by-election, 6 May 2021
Party	Candidate	Votes	%	±%
Conservative	Peter Jackson	359	42.3	
Labour	Elizabeth Haines	206	24.3	
Independent	James Evans	155	18.3	
Independent	Colin Pearce	87	10.2	
Independent	Alan Thomas	24	2.8	
Green	Daniella Vickerstaff	18	2.1	
Majority		153	18.0	
Turnout		863	30.05	
Rejected ballots		14		
Registered electors		2,875		
Conservative gain from Independent				

==== Cheadle South East (2022) ====
The by-election was triggered by the death of independent councillor Richard Alcock.

Cheadle South East by-election, 5 May 2022
Party	Candidate	Votes	%	±%
Conservative	Zenobia Routledge	348	43.0	
Labour	Matthew Spooner	325	40.1	
Independent	Abigail Wilkinson	137	16.9	
Majority		23	2.8	
Turnout		815	28.36	
Rejected ballots		5		
Registered electors		2,874		
Conservative gain from Independent				

==== Biddulph West ====
The by-election was a double by-election following the deaths of Conservative councillor Ian Lawson and independent councillor Hilda Sheldon.

Biddulph West by-election, 19 January 2023
Party	Candidate	Votes	%	±%
Labour	Charlie Smith	364	51.1	
Labour	Dave Proudlove	288	40.4	
Independent	Neil Eardley	226	31.7	
Conservative	Rathi Pragasam	185	25.9	
Independent	Alistair McLoughlin	154	21.6	
Green	Ian Waite	61	8.6	
Turnout		721	17.9	
Rejected ballots		8		
Registered electors		4,039		
Labour gain from Conservative				
Labour gain from Independent				
