= Cheeks Hill =

Hill in the Peak District, England

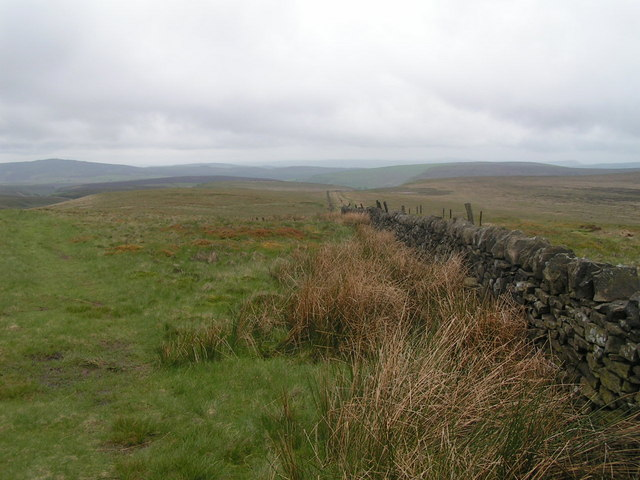
- Cheeks Hill summit from the Staffordshire side

Highest point
- Elevation: 520 m (1,710 ft)
- Coordinates: 53°13′31″N 1°57′44″W

Geography
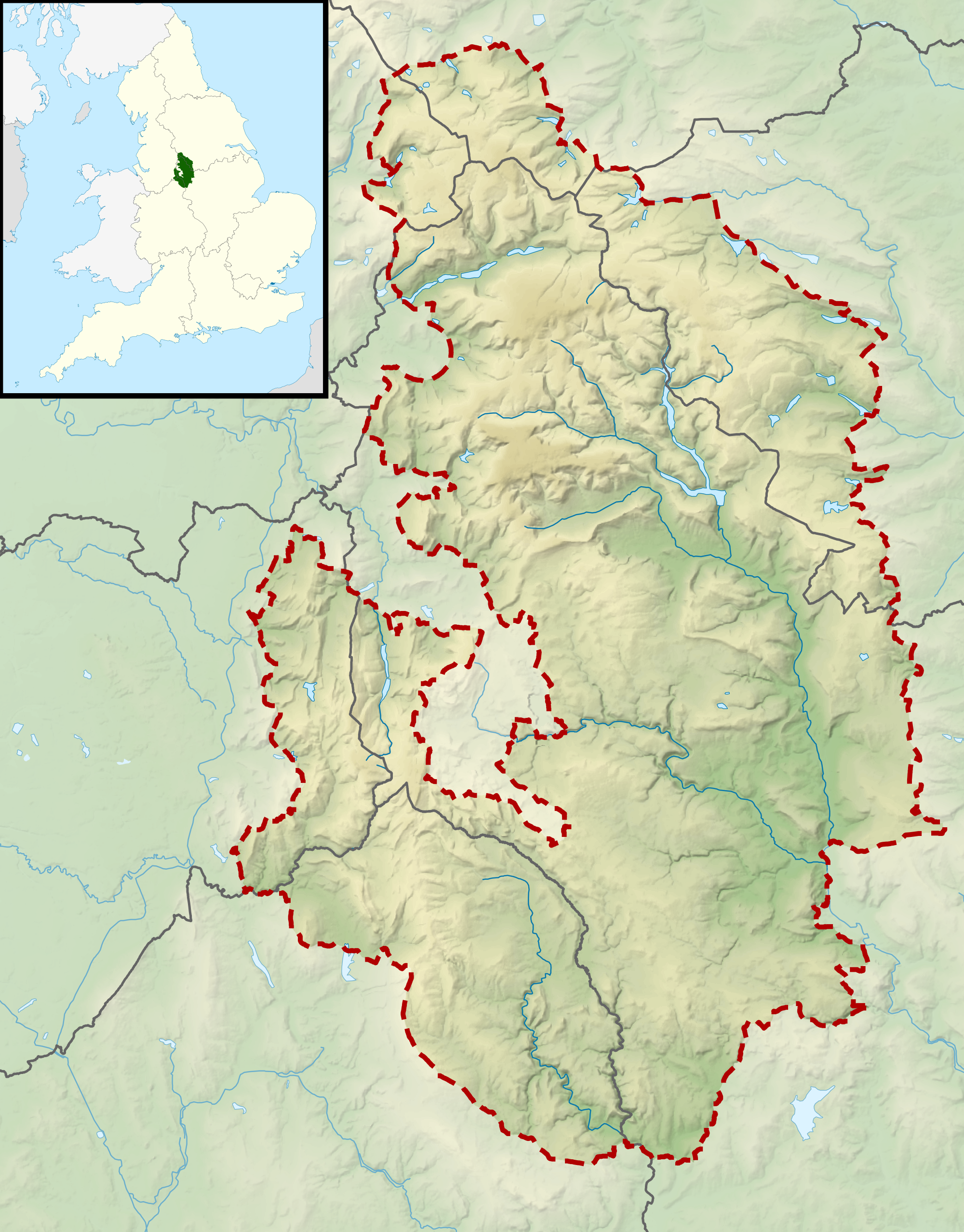
- Location within the Peak District Location within Staffordshire
- Location: Staffordshire/Derbyshire, England
- OS grid: SK0252969826

Cheeks Hill is a hill on Axe Edge Moor in the Peak District, England. It lies just south of the Cat and Fiddle Road near Buxton, and forms part of the border between Derbyshire and Staffordshire. The highest and most northerly point in Staffordshire, at 520 metres (1,710 ft) above sea level, is just south-west of its summit.

== Profile ==
Just south-west of the summit, there is a dry stone wall marking the border between Staffordshire and Derbyshire. On the Staffordshire side there is a disused quarry and shaft. On the Derbyshire side is Dane Head which is the start of the River Dane. Cheeks Hill lies one mile north-east of Three Shires Head, where Staffordshire, Derbyshire and Cheshire meet.
