= Tittesworth =

Civil parish in Staffordshire Morlands, Staffordshire, England

Coordinates: 53°07′30″N 2°00′00″W

Tittesworth is a civil parish in the Staffordshire Moorlands, in Staffordshire, England. It extends from the edge of the town of Leek in the south-west to Blackshaw Moor in the north-east. In the east is the village of Thorncliffe. To the west is the civil parish of Leekfrith, where the boundary is the River Churnet.To the east is the civil parish of Onecote. Tittesworth Brook runs westwards through the area from Thorncliffe, and flows into the Churnet.

The name Tittesworth is Old English: a personal name thought to be Tet, and the word for an enclosed settlement.

== The reservoir ==
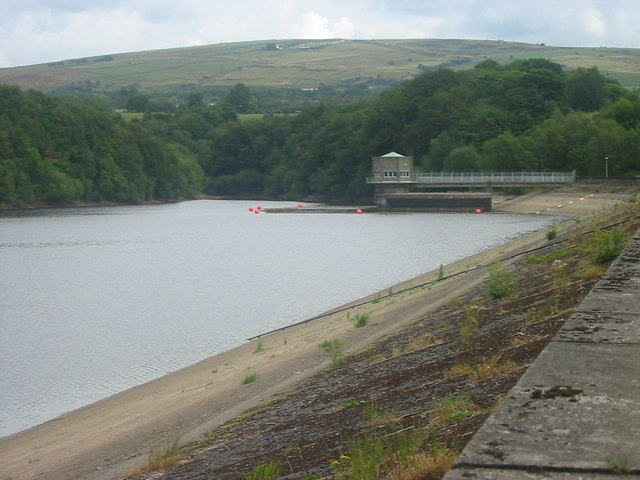
The dam at the southern end of Tittesworth Reservoir

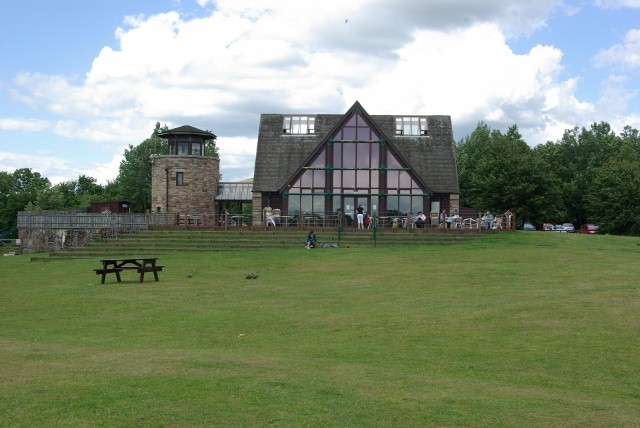
The visitor centre at Tittesworth Reservoir in 2008

Tittesworth Reservoir lies partly in Tittesworth and partly in Leekfrith. It was created in 1858 by the Staffordshire Potteries Water Works Co., by damming the River Churnet. The area was originally 51 acres (21 ha). Work to increase the area to 189 acres (76 ha) was begun in 1959; the extended reservoir was inaugurated by Princess Margaret, Countess of Snowdon in 1962.

The reservoir is now part of Severn Trent Water. It pumps on average 28 million litres of water per day to households and businesses.

== History of the estates near Leek ==
The south-west part of Tittesworth included what was originally the monastic grange of Fowker (later Fowlchurch) and estates at Ball Haye and Haregate. These estates, owned by Dieulacres Abbey, were granted by the Crown, after the Dissolution of the Monasteries, to Sir Ralph Bagnall in 1552. This area near Leek was rural until the 19th century, when, with the development of Ball Haye Green in the 1830s, it began to be a suburb of Leek.

=== Ball Haye ===
In 1565 Sir Ralph Bagnall, lord of Leek Manor, granted Ball Haye to Henry Davenport. It remained in the Davenport family, and in 1786 it was inherited by James Hulme, nephew of John Davenport. He rebuilt the house; in 1819 he mortgaged the estate. After his death in 1848 the house was sold, and let to various tenants. In 1931 the house was sold to the trustees of the Leek Memorial Cottage Hospital; there were plans for a hospital in the grounds of the hall, which were suspended on the outbreak of the Second World War. From 1946 the hall was used as a Polish club, and later it was converted into flats. It became derelict and was demolished in 1972.

=== Fowlchurch ===
Fowlchurch was originally Fowker, a monastic grange of Dieulacres Abbey, established by 1246. By 1552, when it was granted to Sir Ralph Bagnall, it was known as Fowchers Grange. His son Henry sold it in 1597. The present Fowlchurch Farmhouse, a Grade II listed building, was built in the 17th century. By the 19th century the owner was William Brough, a local silk manufacturer, who remodelled the building. In 1969 it was bought by Leek Urban District Council, and it was later sold to the tenants.

=== Haregate ===
Sir Ralph Bagnall sold the Haregate estate in 1565 to Thomas Wardle. By 1720 it was owned by Joshua Toft, a Leek button merchant, who lived there with his brother John. In 1745, some of Charles Edward Stuart's troops were given a meal at Haregate; John Toft was given a receipt for hay and oats for the horses.

It remained in the Toft family until 1948, when the house and 78 acres (32 hectares) were acquired by Leek Urban District Council. The house, a Grade II listed building dating from the early 17th century with later alterations, was converted into three dwellings, and a council estate was built on the land.

== See also ==
- Listed buildings in Tittesworth
