= Hollinsclough =

Village in Staffordshire, England

Coordinates: 53.196°N 1.903°W

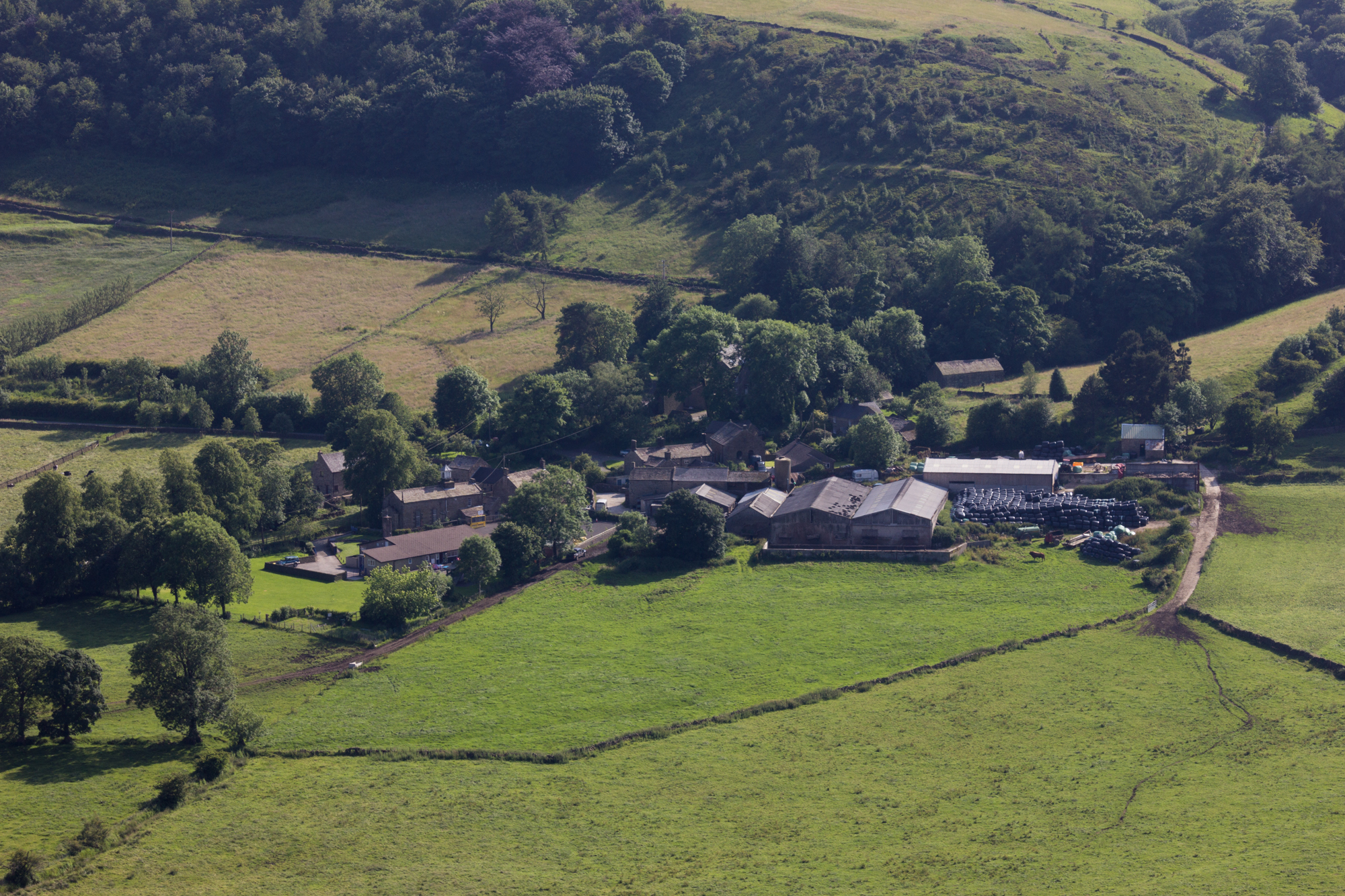
- Hollinsclough as seen from the top of Chrome Hill

- Location within Staffordshire
- Population: 149 (2021)
- OS grid reference: SK065665
- District: Staffordshire Moorlands
- Shire county: Staffordshire
- Region: West Midlands
- Country: England
- Sovereign state: United Kingdom
- Post town: Buxton
- Postcode district: SK17
- Police: Staffordshire
- Fire: Staffordshire
- Ambulance: West Midlands

Hollinsclough is a small rural village in the Staffordshire Moorlands district in the county of Staffordshire, England. It is within the Peak District National Park.

== Location and geography ==
Hollinsclough is on the upper reaches of the River Dove, at one end of a level area between the Dove and the River Manifold, not far from their sources on the eastern side of Axe Edge Moor. Here the Manifold flows through moorland on sandstone and various gritstones, before a conspicuous change at Hulme End, about 6 miles downstream, when the underlying rock changes to limestone. For all its length, the Dove marks the border between Staffordshire and Derbyshire. Not far downstream from Hollinsclough the Dove enters the limestone valley that ends in the famous Dovedale.

The Church of St Agnes, built as a Chapel of Ease in 1840 when Hollinsclough was in the parish of Quarnford, is now linked with the parish of Longnor, about 2 miles east. The church has been abandoned for worship. It was auctioned in March 2023 and is currently being restored.

== The village ==
=== Village name and population ===
According to the English Place-Name Society, the name Hollinsclough comes from Howel's ravine. Various documents, including tenancy records for the Manor of Haysgate in the County of Stafford, from 1651 to 1850 give the following variants of the name. Hollescloughe (1651), Holling Clough (1750), Hollingclough (1767), and The Liberty of Hollinsclough (1769). The population list for 1769 has 112 names. The 1851 Census has 211 male and 189 female inhabitants. Like many other such villages dependent upon hill farming, the population has declined rapidly since then.

=== Village description and activities ===
There is a Methodist Chapel, a primary school and a chapel hall yet the nearest shops or pubs are 2 miles away in the neighbouring village of Longnor. Historically, there was a silk weaving business in the 18th century in the village that transported the silk over to the mills in Macclesfield by packhorses. Today, Hollinsclough is a popular departure point for walkers and tourists visiting the surrounding countryside.

== Methodist Chapel ==
The Chapel was built in 1801 by John Lomas. He was a pedlar and tinker by trade, which at that time was a respectable occupation, dealing in "Manchester goods" such as clothing but chiefly transporting the local silk to mills at Macclesfield. Rev. J B Dyson records his conversion at Flash. Hollinsclough is the only chapel still open in the former Wetton and Longnor Methodist Circuit, and celebrated its bicentenary at Easter 2001.

The chapel hall becomes a lively tearoom at weekends and bank holidays, and plays host to an active and friendly community life, including the monthly meetings of the local history group (History Live) and the local charity (Hollinsclough Action Group).

== See also ==
- Listed buildings in Hollinsclough
