= River Dane =

River in England

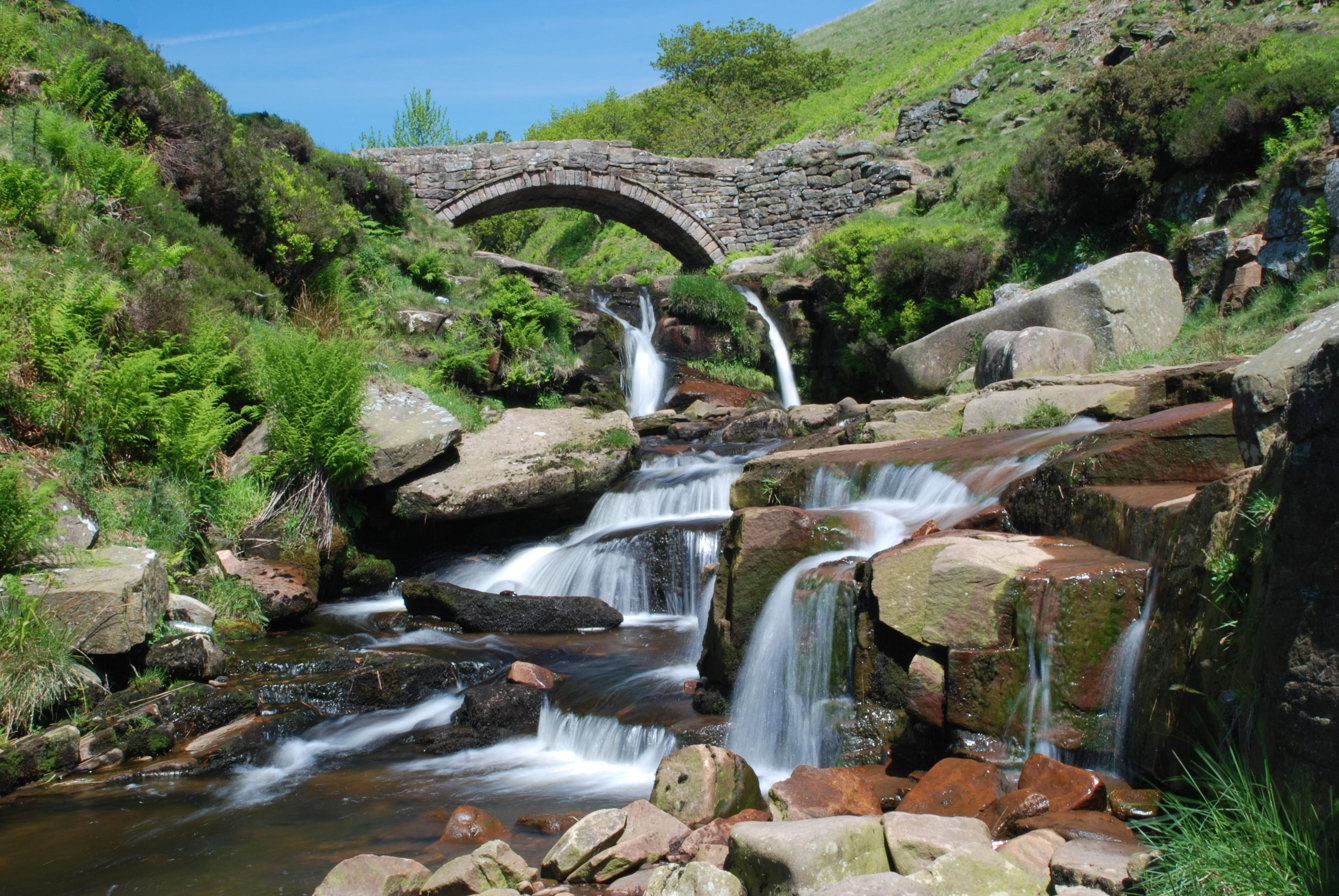
- The Dane at Three Shire Heads

Location
- Country: England
- Counties: Staffordshire, Cheshire, Derbyshire

Physical characteristics
- Source
  - location: Axe Edge Moor
- Mouth
  - location: Confluence with River Weaver
  - coordinates: 53°15′N 2°31′W

Basin features
- Tributaries
  - left: River Croco, River Wheelock

The River Dane is a tributary of the River Weaver that originates in the Peak District area of England. The name of the river (earlier Daven) is probably from the Old Welsh dafn, meaning a "drop or trickle", implying a slow-moving river.

== Course ==
It forms the border between first Cheshire and Derbyshire on the west and east, and then between Cheshire and Staffordshire, then flows northwest through Cheshire to its confluences with the Weaver in Northwich.

The river rises close to the source of the River Goyt just southwest of Buxton, at Dane Head on Axe Edge Moor. Flowing southwest, it forms county borders for around 10 miles (16 km) before flowing west through Congleton and past Holmes Chapel. The point on the river where the three counties meet, at Panniers' Pool Bridge, is called Three Shire Heads (sometimes Three Shires Head). Passing just north of Middlewich, it merges first with the River Croco near the site of the old Roman fort in Harbutt's Field, and then with the River Wheelock near the aqueduct carrying the Trent and Mersey Canal, and runs the remaining 5 miles (8 km) north to Northwich where it flows into the River Weaver.

The River Dane is the longest, cleanest and thought to be the fastest-flowing river through Cheshire. The route of the Dane is followed as closely as possible by the Dane Valley Way, a 48-mile (77 km) walking route from Buxton to Northwich.

Although the main river is part of the Mersey catchment and flows into the Irish Sea, a portion of the water can be diverted via canal feeders into Rudyard Lake and subsequently the Caldon Canal. This water discharges eventually into the River Trent and ultimately into the North Sea, having crossed the English watershed.

== Tributaries ==
- Gad Brook (R)
- Eldersbriar Brook (L)
- Puddlinglake Brook (R)
- River Wheelock (L)
  - Hoggins Brook (L)
  - Fowle Brook (L)
- River Croco (L)
  - Sanderson's Brook (L)
    - Small Brook (L)
- Swettenham Brook
  - Midge Brook (Ls)
    - Chapel Brook (R)
      - Dighill Brook (R)
  - Clonter Brook (Rs)
- Loach Brook
  - Dairy Brook (L)
- The Howty (L)
- Dane in Shaw Brook (L)
  - Biddulph Brook
  - Timbers Brook (R)
- Cow Brook (R)
- Ravensclough Brook (L)
- Shell Brook (R)
- Clough Brook (R)
  - Highmoor Brook (R)
    - Rabb Brook (R)
    - Oaken Brook (R)
  - Cumberland Brook (L)
  - Yarnshaw Brook (L)
    - Correction Brook (L)
  - Tor Brook (R)
- Black Brook
- Flash Brook (L)
  - Far Brook (R)
- Robins Brook (R)
- Three Shires Brook (L)

== History ==
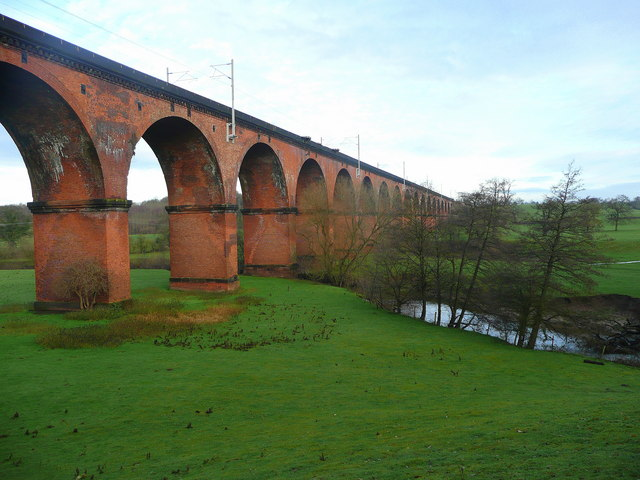
Twemlow Viaduct over the River Dane

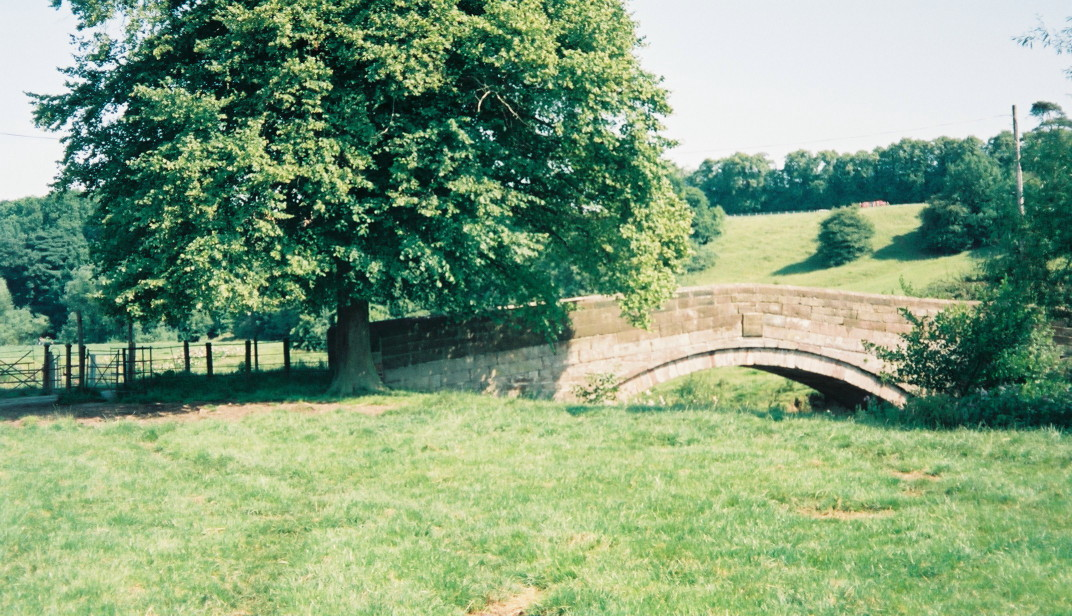
Hermitage Bridge over the River Dane

In 1451 when the River Dane flooded in Congleton, it destroyed the town's corn mill, half of the timber-framed buildings and the wooden bridge over the river. To prevent it from happening again, the river was diverted away from the town. Congleton's textile industry grew from the 14th century, with many water-powered mills built along the river by the 18th century.

A small stone bridge over the river near Holmes Chapel, Hermitage Bridge, was built in 1772 by a local ironmaster. In some years, the river floods widely across the meadows here. Nearby, a tall red brick railway viaduct, built in 1841, spans the broad Dane Valley between Holmes Chapel and Twemlow. It has 23 arches and is Grade II listed. It crosses the River Dane at Saltersford, where Cheshire salt traders once drove their horse-drawn carts through a ford along the toll road.

Reading downstream, the following crossings are all designated listed buildings or scheduled monuments: Dane Bridge, Hug Bridge, Lymford Bridge (early 19th century), Dane Aqueduct over the Macclesfield Canal (1830), Congleton Railway Viaduct (West Coast Main Line, 1849), Colley Mill Bridge, Havannah Bridge (early to mid-19th century, originally leading to a cigar factory), Hermitage Bridge (1772) and Shipbrook Bridge.

== See also ==
- List of rivers in the Peak District
- List of rivers of England
