= Bradnop =

Village in Staffordshire, England

Coordinates: 53.09°N 01.98°W

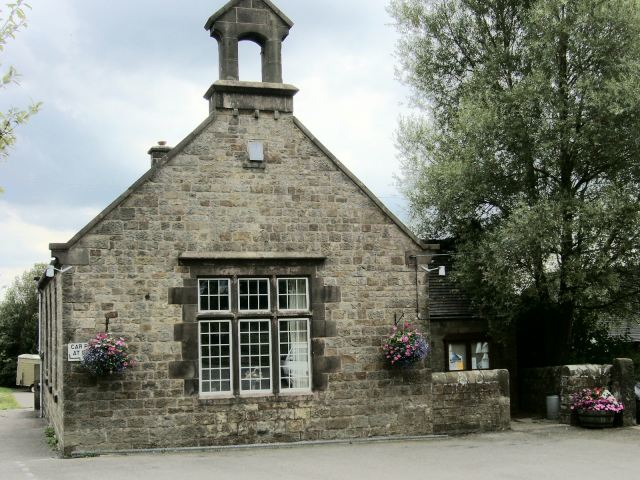
- Bradnop Church

- Location within Staffordshire
- Population: 310 (2011)
- OS grid reference: SK0155
- District: Staffordshire Moorlands
- Shire county: Staffordshire
- Region: West Midlands
- Country: England
- Sovereign state: United Kingdom
- Post town: Leek
- Postcode district: ST13
- Police: Staffordshire
- Fire: Staffordshire
- Ambulance: West Midlands
- UK Parliament: Staffordshire Moorlands

Bradnop is a village in Staffordshire, England, located just a few miles to the southeast of the market town of Leek. The name Bradnop was first recorded in 1197, and gets its name from the Old English words "bradan", meaning broad, and "hop", meaning enclosed valley. Historically Bradnop was a township of the parish of Leek, and later became a civil parish in its own right, with an area 3,568 acres (1,444 hectares).

== Transport ==
In the past, Bradnop was once served by a railway station (on the Cauldon Lowe branch, though however trains on the nearby preserved Churnet Valley Railway pass by Bradnop, but only to as far as Ipstones. Also at Bradnop, lies the 36yd long Bradnop Tunnel also the branch and possibly the shortest on the line as well as the CVR itself.

== See also ==
- Listed buildings in Bradnop
