= Axe Edge Moor =

Moorland and hill in Derbyshire, England

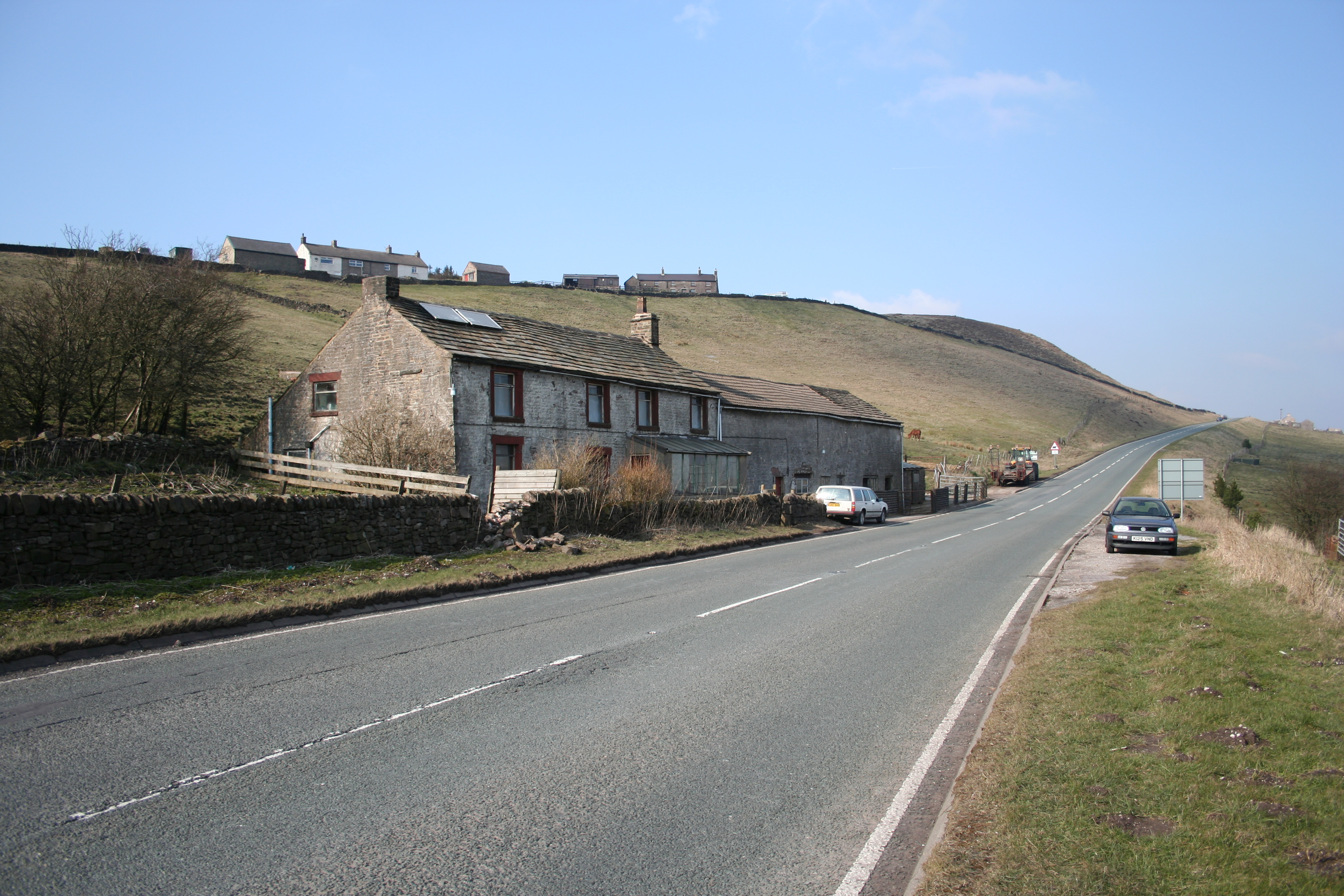
- Dove Head Farm and the A53, looking towards Buxton. On the skyline are the cottages of Axe Edge End.

Highest point
- Elevation: 551 m (1,808 ft)
- Prominence: 84 m
- Listing: Dewey
- Coordinates: 53.23°N 1.95°W

Geography
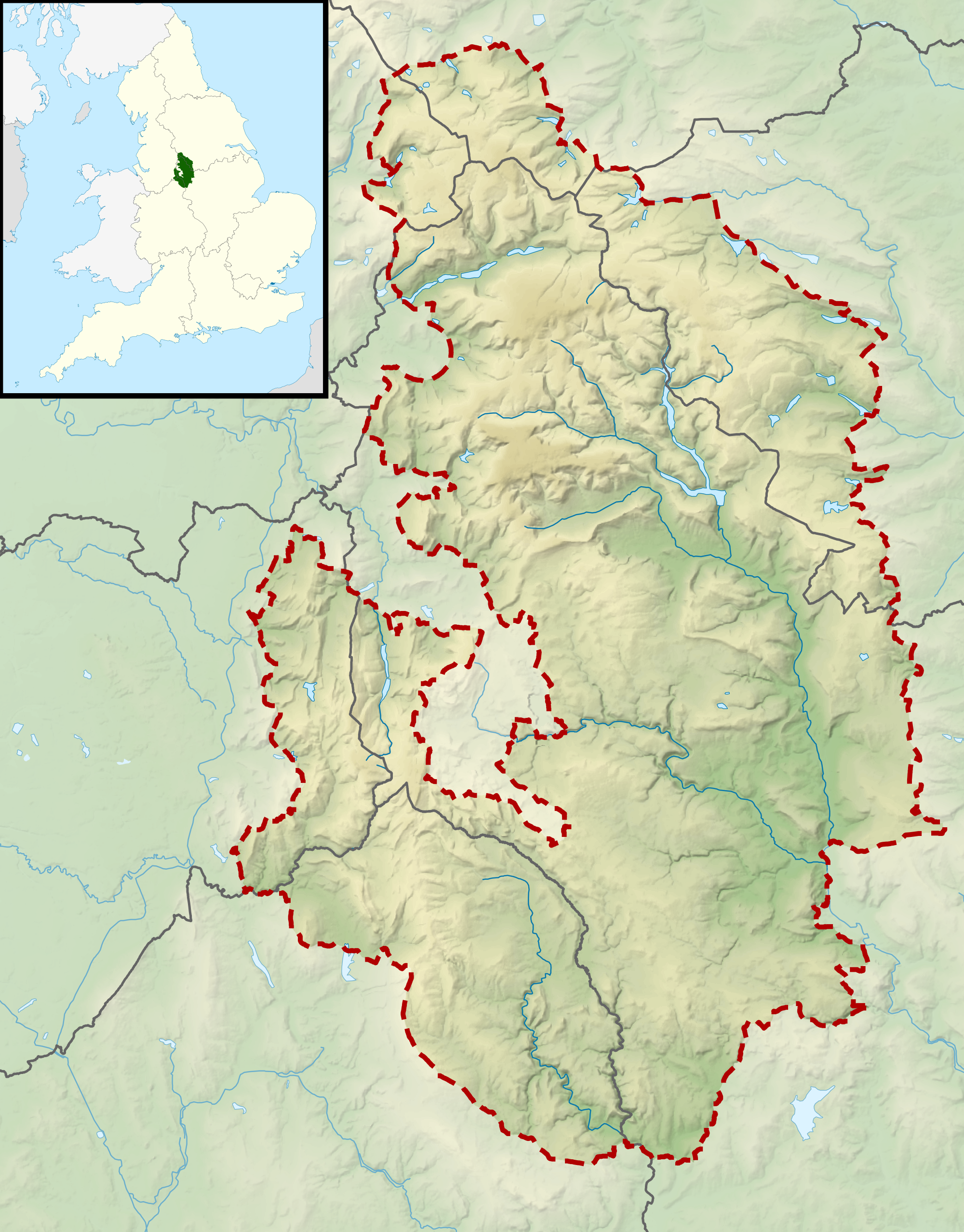
- Location within the Peak District
- Location: Cheshire, Derbyshire, Staffordshire, England
- Parent range: Peak District
- OS grid: SK035706
- Topo map: OS Landranger 119

Axe Edge Moor is the major moorland southwest of Buxton in the Peak District, England. It is mainly gritstone (Namurian shale and sandstone). Its highest point (551 metres (1,808 ft)) is at grid reference SK035706. This is slightly lower than Shining Tor (which is some 5 kilometres (3.1 mi) to the northwest, across the modest dip of the incipient Goyt Valley).

The moor is the source of the River Dove, River Manifold, River Dane, River Wye and River Goyt. It boasted England's second-highest public house (the Cat and Fiddle Inn), which closed in 2015 before reopening as a distillery. The moor is shared between the counties of Derbyshire, Staffordshire and Cheshire, which meet on its southwestern flank at Three Shire Heads on the Dane.

The Axe Edge itself is on the southeastern edge, near the source of the Dove.

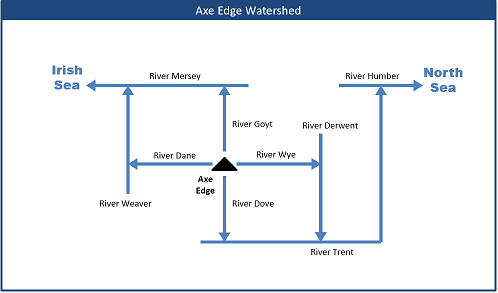
