= Staffordshire Moorlands =

Coordinates: 53°6′23.75″N 2°1′36.06″W

Staffordshire Moorlands District
- Non-metropolitan district
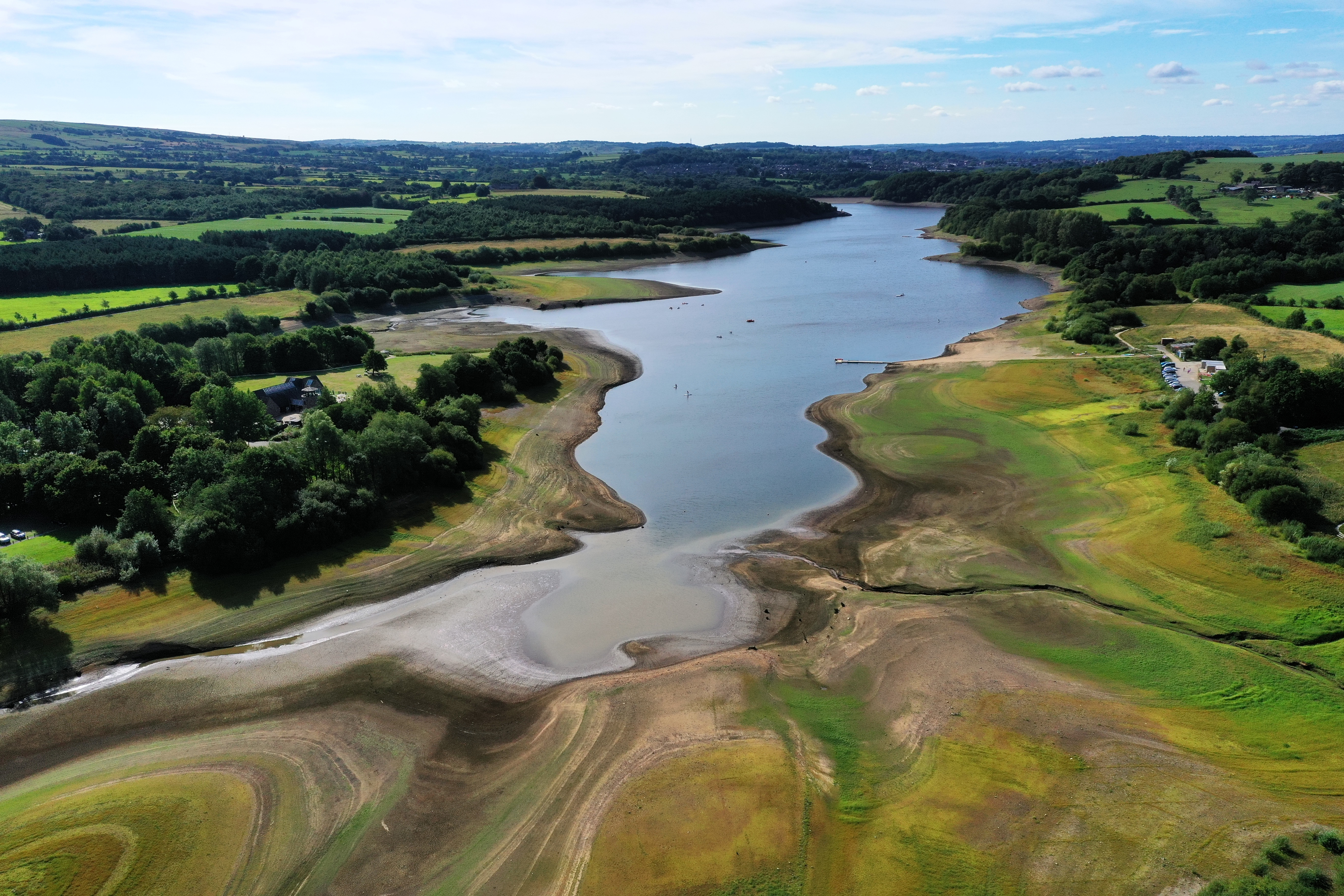
- Tittesworth reservoir in the Staffordshire Moorlands

- Staffordshire Moorlands shown within Staffordshire
- Sovereign state: United Kingdom
- Constituent country: England
- Region: West Midlands
- Non-metropolitan county: Staffordshire
- Status: Non-metropolitan district
- Admin HQ: Leek
- Incorporated: 1 April 1974

Government
  - Type: Non-metropolitan district council
  - Body: Staffordshire Moorlands District Council
  - MPs: Karen Bradley; Allison Gardner

Area
  - Total: 222.4 sq mi (575.9 km^{2})
  - Rank: 67th (of 296)

Population (2025)
  - Total: 96,764
  - Rank: 256th (of 296)
  - Density: 435.2/sq mi (168.0/km^{2})

Ethnicity (2021)
  - Ethnic groups: List: 98% White; 0.9% Mixed; 0.7% Asian; 0.2% Black; 0.2% other

Religion (2021)
  - Religion: List: 59.3% Christianity; 33.9% no religion; 0.3% Islam; 0.1% Hinduism; 0.1% Judaism; 0.1% Sikhism; 0.2% Buddhism; 0.4% other; 5.7% not stated
- Time zone: UTC0 (GMT)
  - Summer (DST): UTC+1 (BST)
- ONS code: 41UH (ONS); E07000198 (GSS)
- OS grid reference: SJ9821356633

Staffordshire Moorlands is a local government district in Staffordshire, England. Its council is based in Leek, the district's largest town. The district also contains the towns of Biddulph and Cheadle, along with a large rural area containing many villages. North-eastern parts of the district lie within the Peak District National Park.

The area's principal industries are agriculture, fashion and tourism. Visitor attractions include the National Trust property Biddulph Grange, the Churnet Valley Railway, the UK's largest theme park Alton Towers Resort, and the annual Leek Arts Festival. There are also a variety of outdoor pursuits such as rock climbing (The Roaches), sailing (Rudyard Lake) and cycling (Waterhouses).

The neighbouring districts are East Staffordshire, Stafford, Stoke-on-Trent, Newcastle-under-Lyme, Cheshire East, High Peak and Derbyshire Dales.

== History ==
Historically the area was contained in the Hundred of Totmonslow, except for the parish of Biddulph, which was in Pirehill Hundred. The district makes up the majority of the area of the now obsolete Totmonslow Hundred, with the remaining area of the Hundred now falling in East Staffordshire District. The Hundred was named after a small hamlet of Totmonslow in the parish of Draycott in the Moors, which is within Staffordshire Moorlands District.

The district was created on 1 April 1974 under the Local Government Act 1972 covering four former districts, which were all abolished at the same time:

- Biddulph Urban District
- Cheadle Rural District
- Leek Rural District
- Leek Urban District

The new district was named Staffordshire Moorlands, reflecting the landscape of this sparsely populated and largely upland part of the county.

In February 2008, the council formed a strategic alliance with the neighbouring High Peak Borough Council to share a number of services and staff as a way of reducing costs, including a shared chief executive and senior management team.

== Abolition ==
Under current local government reorganisation plans, all district councils in Staffordshire, as well as the county council, will be abolished in 2028, with the district forming part of a new North Staffordshire unitary authority along with the two-tier district of Newcastle-under-Lyme and the existing unitary authority of Stoke-on-Trent.

== Governance ==
Staffordshire Moorlands District Council

Type
- Type: Non-metropolitan district

Leadership
- Chair: Linda Malyon, Independent since 13 May 2026
- Leader: Mike Gledhill, Labour since 17 May 2023
- Chief Executive: Andrew Stokes since September 2020

Structure
- Seats: 56 councillors
- Graph of the party split among 56 seats.
- Political groups: Administration (21) Labour (21) Other parties (35) Conservative (21) Green (2) Liberal Democrats (1) Reform (1) Independent (10)

Elections
- Voting system: First past the post
- Last election: 4 May 2023

Meeting place
- Moorlands House, Stockwell Street, Leek, ST13 6HQ

Website
- www.staffsmoorlands.gov.uk

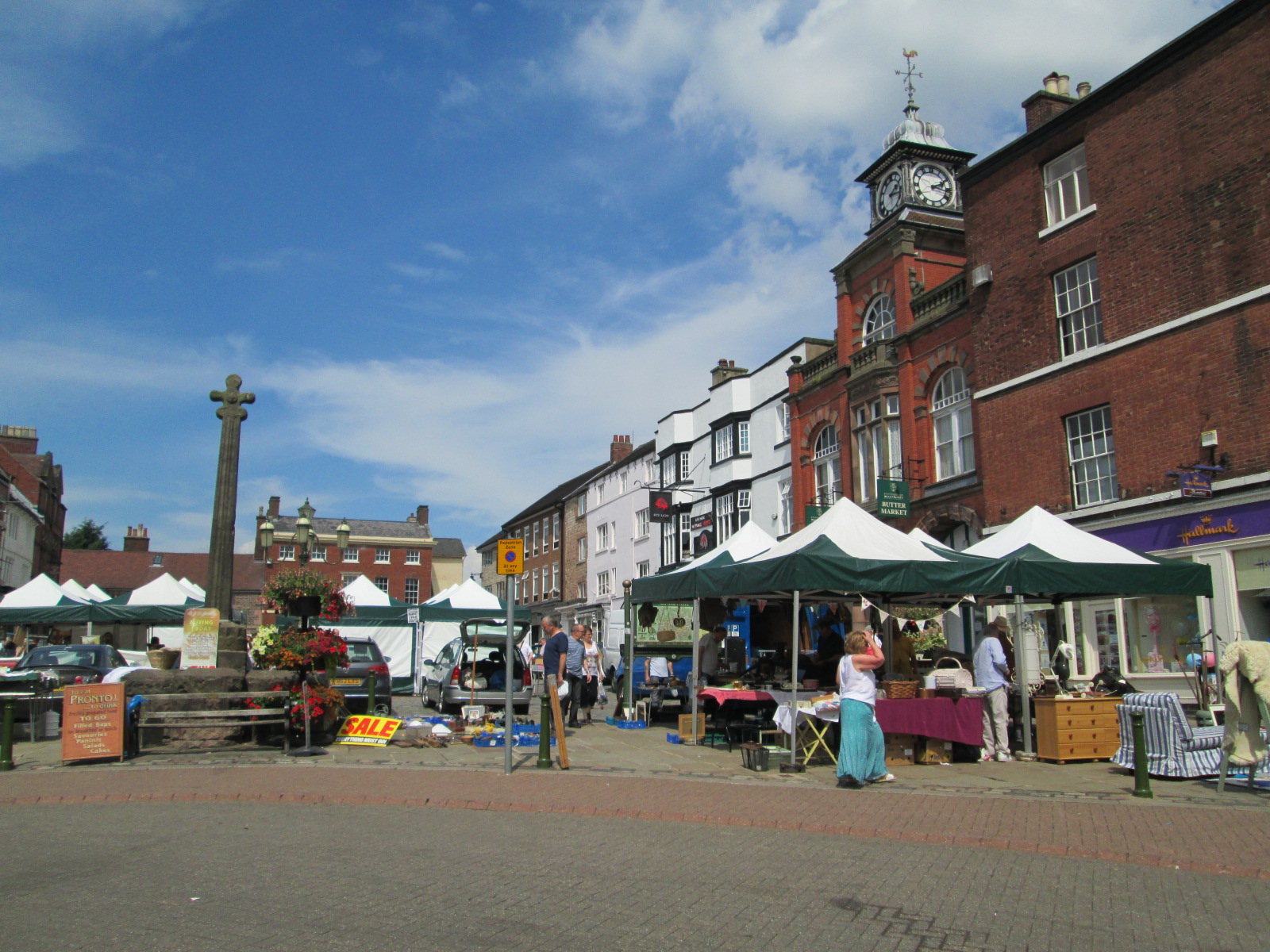
Leek, the district's largest town and administrative headquarters.

Staffordshire Moorlands District Council provides district-level services. County-level services are provided by Staffordshire County Council. The whole district is also covered by civil parishes, which form a third tier of local government.

Large parts of the district are within the Peak District National Park. In those areas, town planning is the responsibility of the Peak District National Park Authority. The district council appoints one of its councillors to serve on the 30-person National Park Authority.

=== Political control ===
The council has been under no overall control since the 2023 election, being led by a Labour minority administration.

The first elections were held in 1973, initially operating as a shadow authority alongside the outgoing authorities until the new arrangements came into effect on 1 April 1974. Political control of the council since 1974 has been as follows:

Party in control	Years
No overall control	1974–1991
Independent	1991–1995
No overall control	1995–2007
Conservative	2007–2011
No overall control	2011–2015
Conservative	2015–2019
No overall control	2019–2022
Conservative	2022–2023
No overall control	2023–present

=== Leadership ===
The leaders of the council since 1981 have been:

Councillor	Party	From	To
Ted Wood	Conservative	1981	May 1987
Simon Newall	Conservative	May 1987	May 1991
Alan Hurst	Ratepayers	May 1991	May 1995
Don Mole	Labour	May 1995	May 1999
Ted Perry	Conservative	May 1999	2003
Ron Locker	Ratepayers	2003	May 2007
Sybil Ralphs	Conservative	19 May 2007	4 May 2022
Paul Roberts	Conservative	4 May 2022	May 2023
Mike Gledhill	Labour	17 May 2023	

=== Composition ===
Following the 2023 election, and subsequent changes of allegiance up to September 2026, the composition of the council was:

Party	Seats
Labour	21
Conservative	21
Green	2
Liberal Democrats	1
Reform	1
Independent	10
Total	56

=== Elections ===
Since the last boundary changes in 2003 the council has comprised 56 councillors representing 27 wards, with each ward electing one, two or three councillors. Elections are held every four years.

Staffordshire Moorlands is the local UK Parliament constituency. Its boundaries do not match up with the District Council area. The MP since 2010 has been Karen Bradley, a Conservative. She served as Secretary of State for Culture, Media and Sport from 14 July 2016 until 8 January 2018, when she was appointed Secretary of State for Northern Ireland.

=== Premises ===
The council is based at Moorlands House on Stockwell Street in Leek. The front part of the building facing Stockwell Street was formerly called New Stockwell House and had been built in 1937 as the headquarters of the Leek and Moorlands Building Society (later the Leek and Westbourne Building Society). The building was acquired in early 1974 as part of the preparations for the local government reorganisation later that year. A large extension including a new main entrance was added to the rear of the building in 1986, after which the building was renamed Moorlands House.

== Geography ==
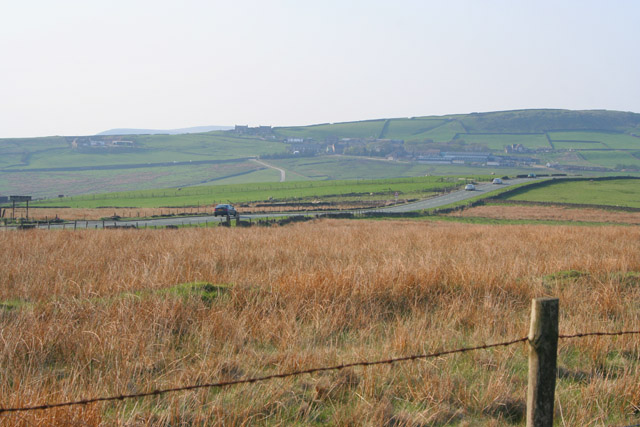
Moors located within the district

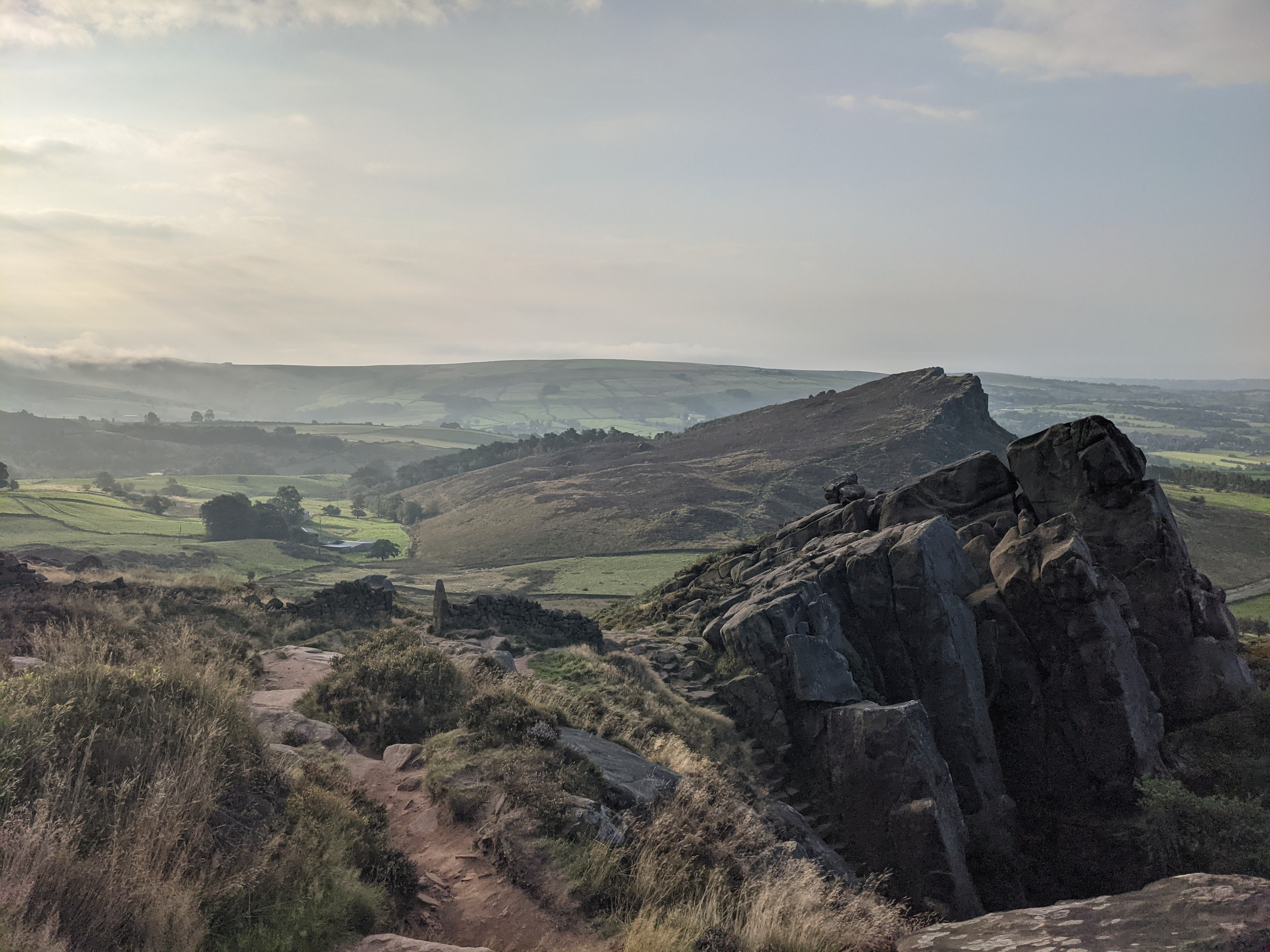
Looking southeast over the Roaches and Hen Cloud

The Staffordshire Moorlands district is in the southern end and foothills of the Pennines, with some of the northern parts lying in the Peak District National Park. The terrain is mostly uplands to the north of the district and lower-lying to the south, with rolling hills, crags and valleys across forests and lakes. The upland terrain is divided into high gritstone moorlands of the Dark Peak in the northwest and limestone landscape of the White Peak in the northeast. The district is named after the moors in the northwest along with smaller patches of lowland heaths across the district, such as Wetley Moor near Werrington. The highest point in both the district and Staffordshire is Cheeks Hill, rising up to 520m (1,710 feet) on Axe Edge Moor.

The area approximately between Axe Edge Moor and the Churnet Valley is in the Dark Peak and includes the Roaches, a series of gritstone outcrops which rises to 505m (1,657 feet) and where several red-necked wallabies roamed free for many years. On the other hand, the western half of Dovedale and the Manifold Valley, including Thor's Cave, Wetton Mill, Longnor and Butterton, are in the White Peak. The Churnet Valley is a steep-sided, wooded valley in the south of the district, running between Cheddleton and Rocester, also known as "The Rhineland of Staffordshire" or Staffordshire's "Little Switzerland".

The Staffordshire Moorlands is also home to the highest village in Britain, Flash. The village stands at 463m (1,518 feet) above sea level. This record was confirmed in 2007 by the Ordnance Survey after Wanlockhead in Scotland also claimed the record. The BBC's The One Show investigated the case in a bid to settle the argument and Flash turned out to be the higher of the two.

The council maintains a number of local nature reserves including Biddulph Valley Way, Brough Park Fields, Cecilly Brook, Hales Hall Pool, Hoften's Cross Meadows, Ladderedge Country Park and Marshes Hill Common.

== Media ==
In terms of television, the area is served by BBC West Midlands and ITV Central broadcasting from Birmingham. Television signals are received the Sutton Coldfield TV transmitter. However, Biddulph is served by BBC North West and ITV Granada, broadcast from Salford. Television signals for the town are received from the Winter Hill TV transmitter and the local relay transmitter.

Radio stations for the area are BBC Radio Stoke, Hits Radio Staffordshire & Cheshire, Greatest Hits Radio Staffordshire & Cheshire and Moorlands Radio, a community-based radio station that broadcasts from its studios in Leek.

The Sentinel is the local newspaper that covers the area.

== Towns and parishes ==
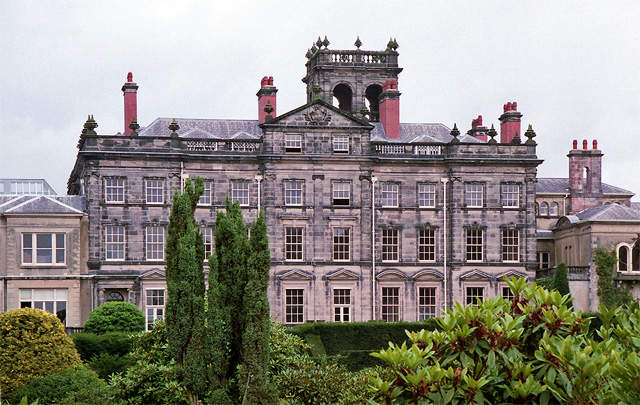
Biddulph Grange in Biddulph, the district's second largest town.

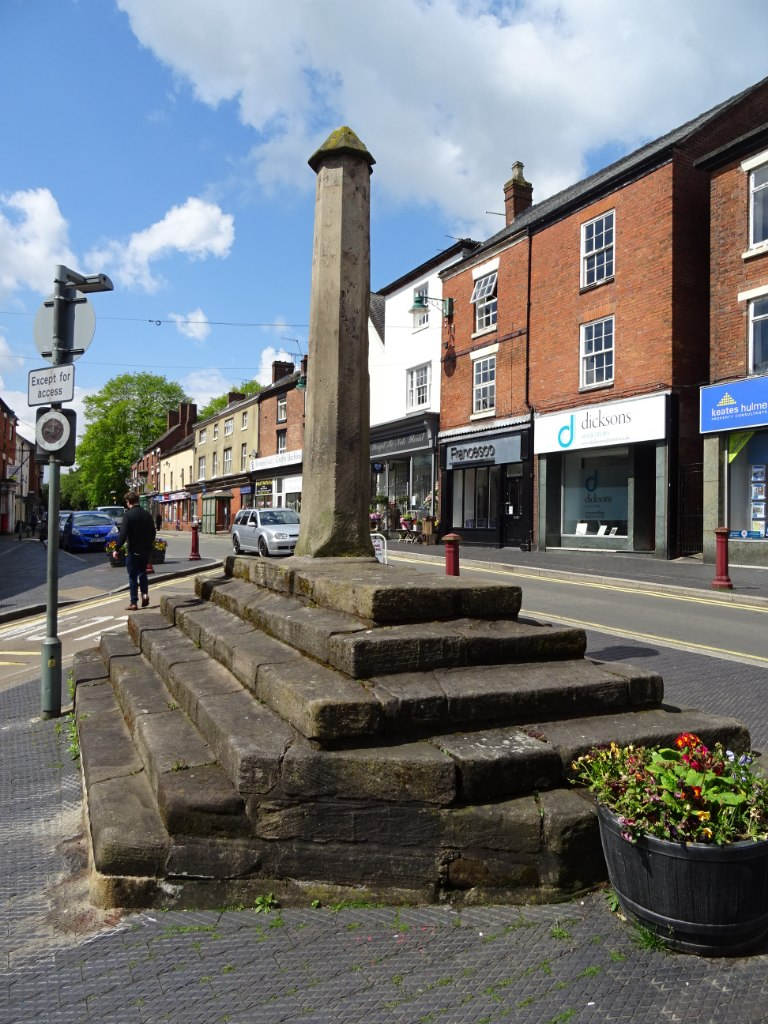
Cheadle, the district's third largest town.

The whole district is covered by civil parishes. The parish councils for Biddulph, Cheadle and Leek have declared their parishes to be towns, allowing them to take the style "town council". The small parish of Blore with Swinscoe has a parish meeting rather than a parish council. The parishes are:

- Alstonefield
- Alton
- Bagnall
- Biddulph
- Blore with Swinscoe
- Blythe Bridge
- Bradnop
- Brown Edge
- Butterton
- Caverswall
- Cheadle
- Checkley
- Cheddleton
- Consall
- Cotton
- Dilhorne
- Draycott in the Moors
- Endon and Stanley
- Farley
- Fawfieldhead
- Forsbrook
- Grindon
- Heathylee
- Heaton
- Hollinsclough
- Horton
- Ilam
- Ipstones
- Kingsley
- Leek
- Leekfrith
- Longnor
- Longsdon
- Oakamoor
- Onecote
- Quarnford
- Rushton
- Sheen
- Tittesworth
- Warslow and Elkstones
- Waterhouses
- Werrington
- Wetton, Staffordshire

== Twinnings ==
Staffordshire Moorlands has twinning agreements with:

- Olkusz, Poland
