= Sheen Hill =

Hill in Staffordshire, England

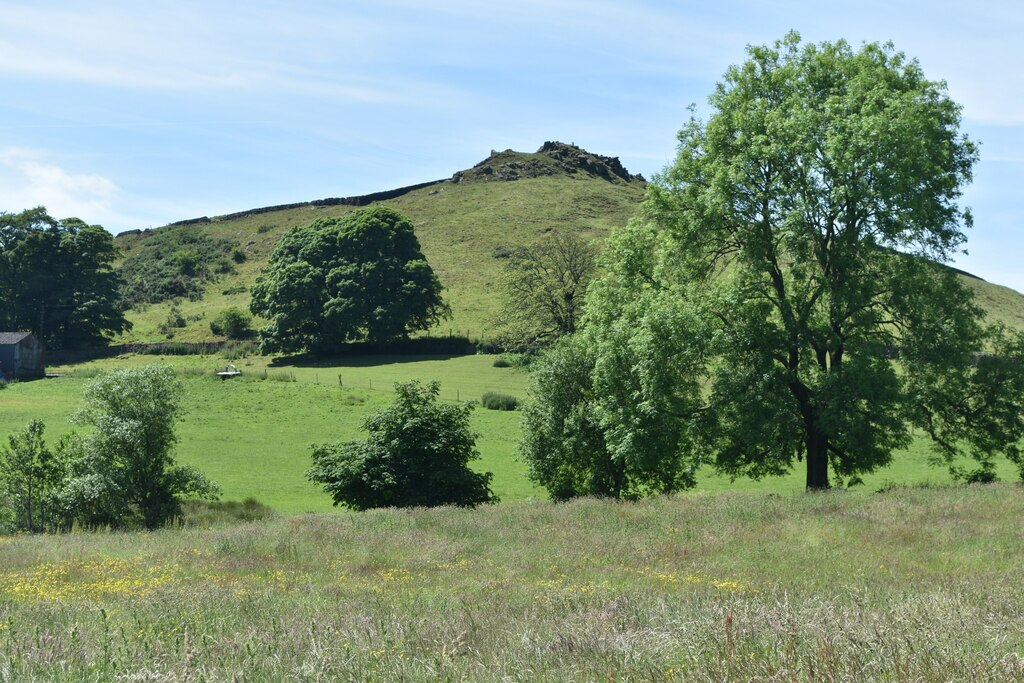
- Viewed from the east

Highest point
- Elevation: 380 m (1,250 ft)
- Prominence: 98 metres (322 ft)
- Coordinates: 53°09′35.6″N 1°50′09.8″W

Geography
- Location within Staffordshire
- Location: Near Sheen, Staffordshire
- OS grid: SK 11059 62543

Sheen Hill is a geographical feature, a hill about 1 mile (1.6 km) north of Sheen and about 2 miles (3 km) south-east of Longnor, near the north-east boundary of Staffordshire, England. It lies between the River Manifold to the west and the River Dove to the east.

Its elevation is 380 metres (1,250 ft), and its prominence is 98 metres (322 ft). There is a triangulation pillar at the summit.

It is at the southern end of a ridge forming Sheen Moor; the ridge runs north-west to Knowsley, near the northern boundary of the civil parish of Sheen. Geologically, the area consists of millstone grit.

Building stone used to be quarried from the summit and the southern slope, and nearby at Stonepit Hill, west of Sheen Hill, and at Pitts Top. The Church of St Luke at Sheen was rebuilt in the 19th century using stone from Sheen Hill.

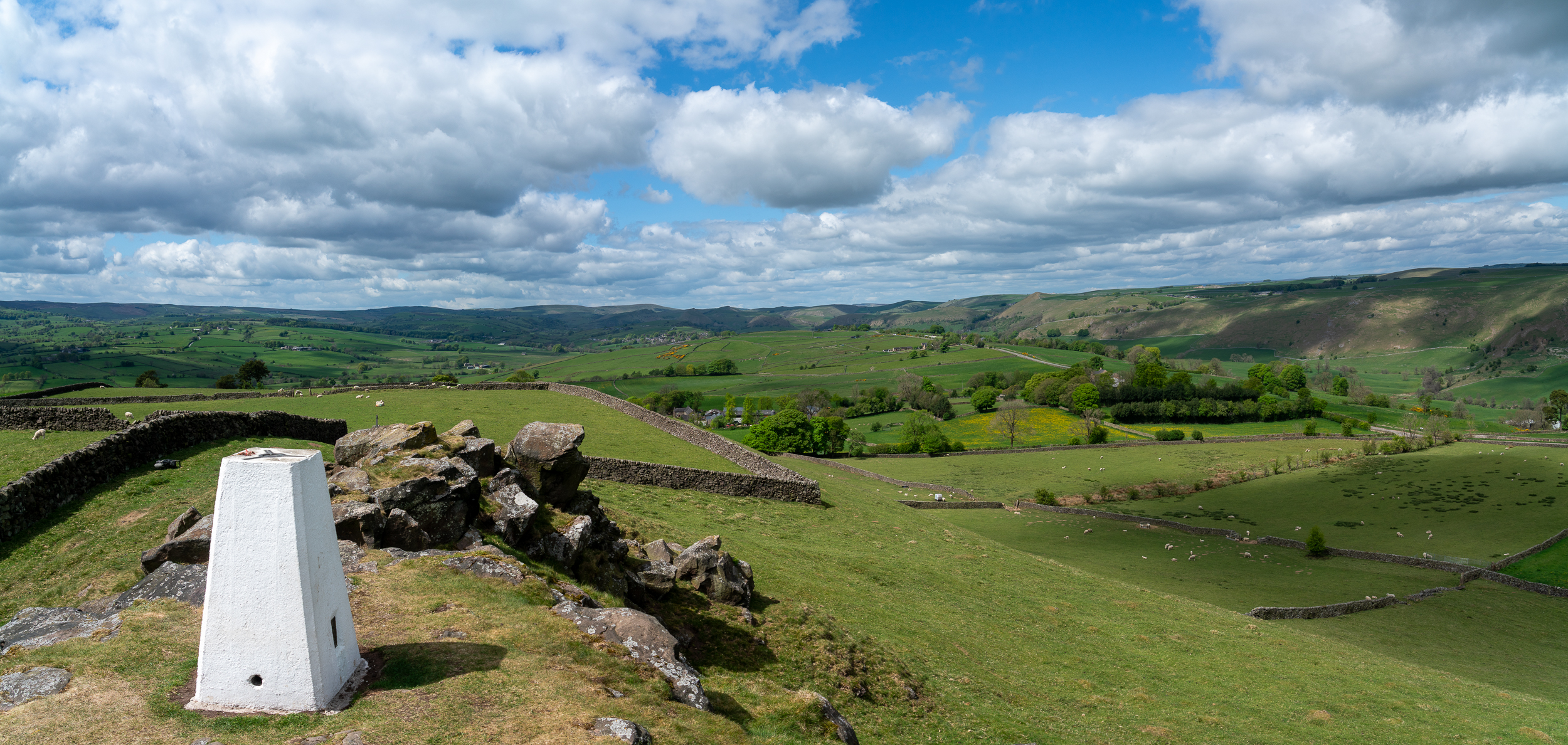
The triangulation pillar at the summit, looking north-west
