= Victorian restoration =

Movement to refurbish and rebuild Church of England churches and cathedrals

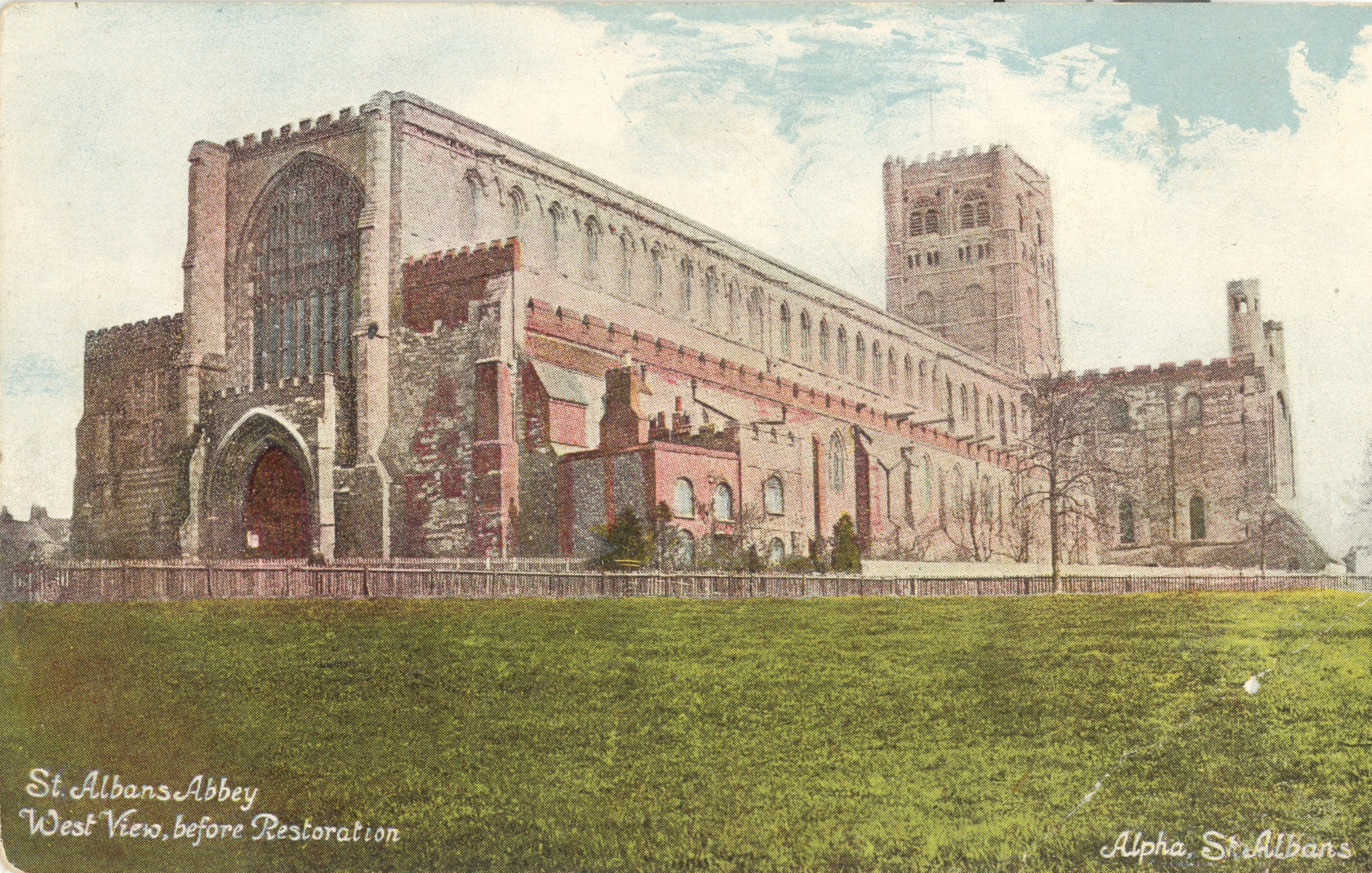
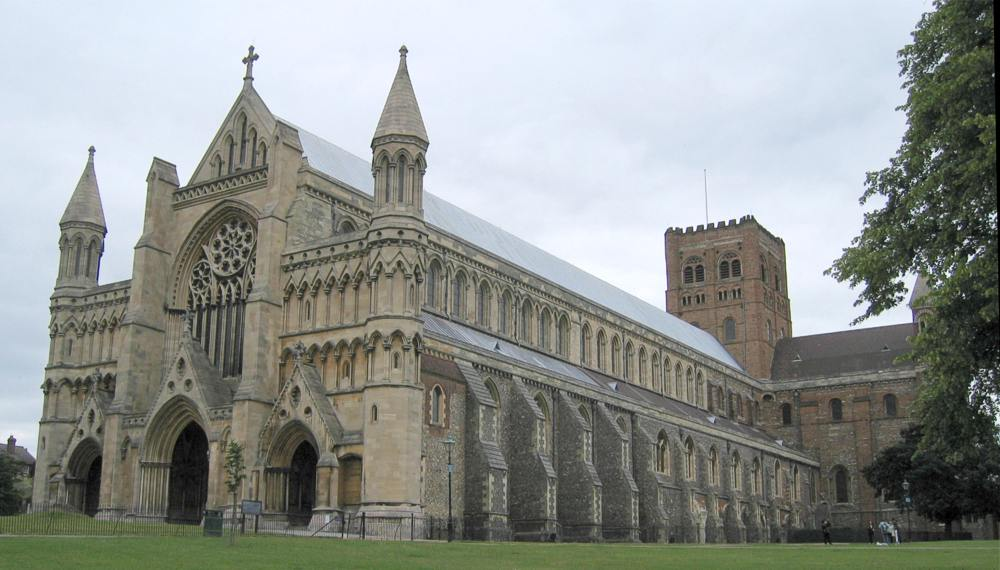
St Albans Cathedral before and after restoration in 1880. The amateur architect Lord Grimthorpe's rebuilding of the west front removed the cathedral's Perpendicular architectural features, replacing them with his own designs. These are considered unsympathetic to the fabric of the building, and were criticised by commentators even at the time.

The Victorian restoration was the widespread and extensive refurbishment and rebuilding of medieval Church of England churches and cathedrals that took place in England and Wales during the 19th-century reign of Queen Victoria. It was not the same process as is understood today by the term building restoration.

Against a background of poorly maintained church buildings, a reaction against the Puritan ethic manifested in the Gothic Revival, and a shortage of churches where they were needed in cities, the Cambridge Camden Society and the Oxford Movement advocated a return to a more medieval attitude to churchgoing. The change was embraced by the Church of England which saw it as a means of reversing the decline in church attendance.

The principle was to "restore" a church to how it might have looked during the Decorated style of architecture which existed between 1260 and 1360, and many famous architects such as George Gilbert Scott and Ewan Christian enthusiastically accepted commissions for restorations. It is estimated that around 80% of all Church of England churches were affected in some way by the movement, varying from minor changes to complete demolition and rebuilding.

Influential people like John Ruskin and William Morris were opposed to such large-scale restoration, and their activities eventually led to the formation of societies dedicated to building preservation, such as the Society for the Protection of Ancient Buildings. In retrospect the period of Victorian restoration has been viewed in a generally unfavourable light, though it did result in the rediscovery of some long-lost features and some churches that would otherwise have fallen into disrepair were saved.

== Background ==
A number of factors working together led to the spate of Victorian restoration.

From the time of the English Reformation onwards, apart from necessary repairs so that buildings might remain in use, and the addition of occasional internal commemorative adornments, English churches and cathedrals were subjected to little building work and only piecemeal restoration. This situation lasted for about 250 years with the fabric of many churches and cathedrals suffering from neglect. The severity of the problem was demonstrated when the spire of Chichester Cathedral suddenly telescoped in on itself in 1861.

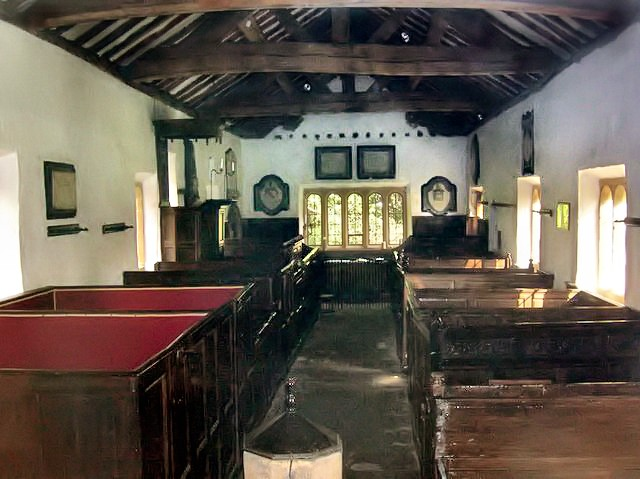
The unrestored interior of the Puritan Chapel, Bramhope, West Yorkshire

In addition, ever since the mid-17th century Puritan reforms, which were typified by a minimum of ritual and decoration and by an unambiguous emphasis on preaching, there had been an ongoing removal of any emotion or colour from English religious services as a means of distancing itself from what was seen as the excesses of Catholicism but towards the end of the 18th century the burgeoning Gothic Revival and interest in medievalism encouraged people to seek more interest in their religious services. The popularity of the Gothic Revival was seen by Church officials as a way to reverse the decline in church attendance, and thereby start to reassert the Church's power, prosperity and influence. They therefore pushed for massive restoration programs.

As a third factor, the Industrial Revolution had resulted in many people living in cities that had few churches to cater for their religious needs—for instance Stockport had a population of nearly 34,000 but church seating for only 2,500. The rise in dissenter denominations, such as Methodism and the Religious Society of Friends, was seen as further evidence of this shortfall. To fulfil this need, between 1818 and 1824 the Government had granted £1.5 million for building new churches. Known as Commissioners' churches, most of them cost only £4,000 to £5,000 each to build, and dissatisfaction with their indifferent design and cheap construction provoked a strong reaction.

== Driving forces ==
=== The Cambridge Camden Society ===
My first church dates from the same year with
the foundation of the Cambridge Camden
Society, to whom the honour of our recovery
from the odious bathos is mainly due.
I only wish I had known its founders at the time.

— George Gilbert Scott, Recollections, p. 86.

One of the main driving forces for the restoration of churches was the Cambridge Camden Society (CCS), which was founded in 1839 by two Cambridge undergraduates, John Mason Neale and Benjamin Webb, as a club for those who shared a common interest in Gothic church design. It rapidly became popular: its membership increased from 8 to 180 in its first 12 months. Although initially a society for recording and discussing medieval church features, the members of the CCS soon began to expostulate in their journal The Ecclesiologist and particularly in their Few Words to Church-builders of 1844 that the only "correct" form for a church building was the "middle pointed" or "Decorated" style, in which churches had been built during the hundred years centred on 1300. Ecclesiology obviously struck a chord in society: it was closely linked with the ongoing interest in medievalism and the Gothic Revival.

The CCS's firm insistence on one style being correct proved to be a beacon for those who were no longer able to judge for themselves what was "good" in architecture—the certainties of the Vitruvian rules having lost their power during the Romantic movement that had been in vogue since the middle of the 18th century. The CCS stated that there were two possible ways in which a church could be restored. As Kenneth Clark put it, they said that one could "either restore each of the various alterations and additions in its own style, or restore the whole church to the best and purest style of which traces remain". The Society wholeheartedly recommended the second option and since virtually every medieval church had at least some small remnant of decorated style, maybe a porch or even just a window, the whole church would be "restored" to match it. If the earliest portions were too late, then it was a candidate for a complete rebuild in the "correct" style.

"To restore," The Ecclesiologist declared, "is to revive the original appearance ... lost by decay, accident or ill-judged alteration". They did later admit, though, that such "restoration" might create an ideal state that the building had never been in.

=== Oxford Movement ===
Church restorations were also strongly influenced by the Oxford Movement, which advocated moving the centre of importance in the church from preaching to the sacrament of the Eucharist: from the pulpit to the altar. Consequences of this included moving the pulpit from a more central position to the side of the church, replacing box pews with open pews, creating a central aisle to give a better view of the altar, and the removal of galleries. Another consequence was that a larger chancel was required for the associated ritual.

== Activities ==
Persuaded by the Cambridge Camden Society that Decorated Gothic was the only correct style, and by the Oxford Movement's theories concerning the nature of worship, a spate of "restoration" was soon under way. Some figures give an idea of the scale. A total of 3,765 new and rebuilt churches were consecrated in the forty years up to 1875, with the most active decade being the 1860s in which there were more than 1,000 such consecrations. Over 7,000 parish churches in England and Wales – nearly 80% of them – were restored in some way between 1840 and 1875. There were 150% more people identified as professional architects in the 1871 census than in 1851 – established architects passed small restoration jobs on to their newly qualified colleagues, since such work provided good practice.

The retention of original material (carving, woodwork, etc.) tended to be of little importance to the early restorers: appearance was all, and much good old work was discarded to be replaced by modern replacement in the chosen style. Different architects had different degrees of sympathy with original material, and as the century progressed greater care was generally taken; this was at least partly as a result of the increasingly louder voices that were raised in opposition.

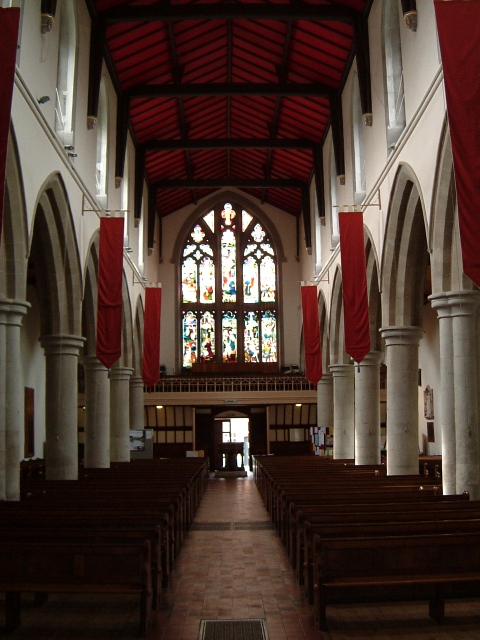
The nave of St Peter's, Berkhamsted, with Butterfield's restorations

As an example of the type of work undertaken in one church, in 1870–71 the Church of St Peter, Great Berkhamsted, was the subject of a restoration programme by William Butterfield, whose other works included churches such as All Saints, Margaret Street in London. Butterfield's restoration involved the removal of some original features, including the obliteration of paintings on the pillars. The most substantial structural changes involved raising both the roof and the floor of the chancel, raising the roof of the south transept to its original pitch, removing the vestry, incorporating the south porch into the south aisle and removing the door, re-flooring the nave, installing new oak benches and replacing an earlier gallery. Butterfield also installed clear windows in the clerestory, allowing more light to enter the nave. He extended the aisles by knocking down the dividing walls of two chambers at the west end. On the exterior of the church, Butterfield removed the crumbling stucco that had been added in 1820 and re-faced the church walls with flintwork.

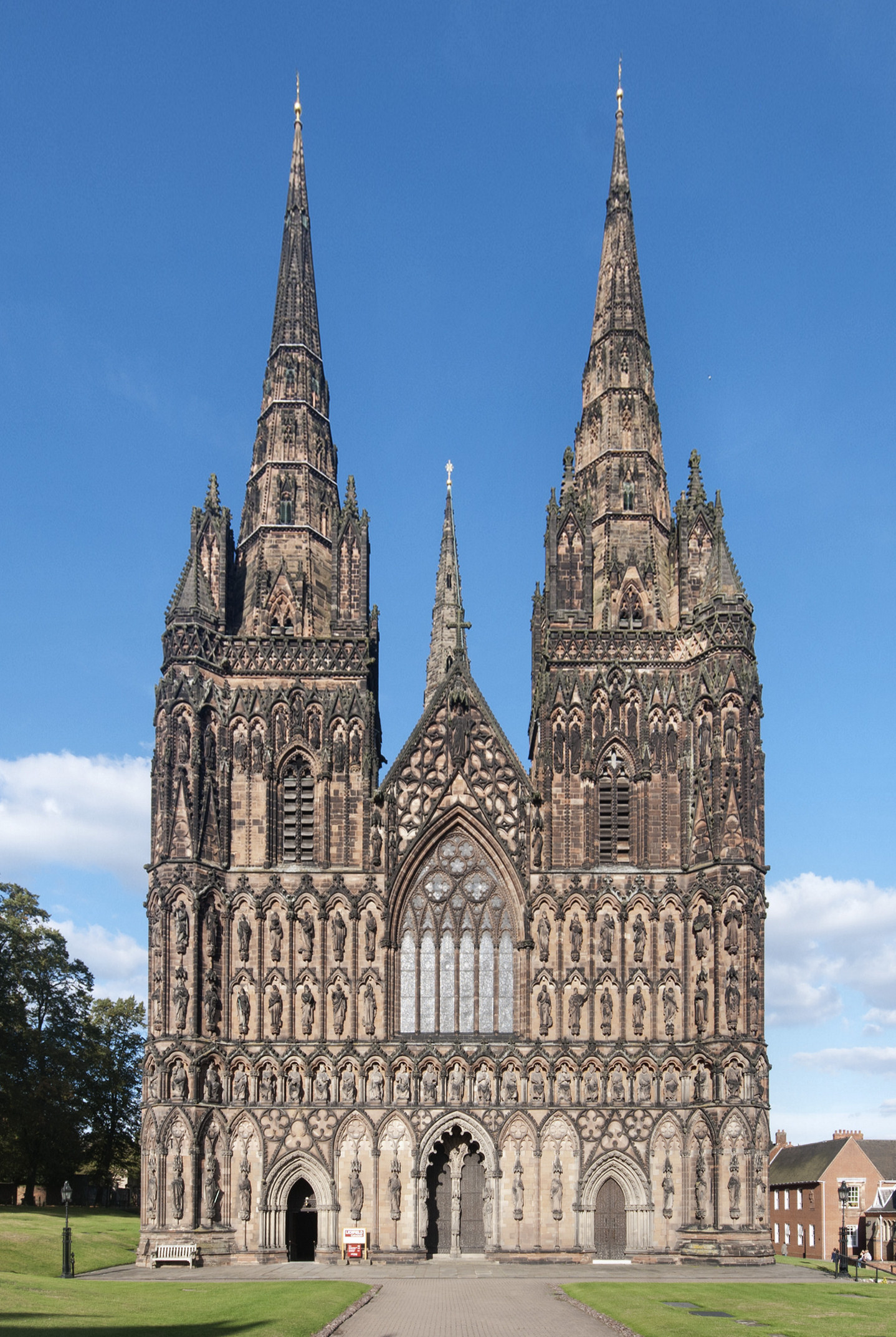
The west front of Lichfield Cathedral as restored by George Gilbert Scott

At Lichfield Cathedral, the 18th century had been a period of decay: the 15th-century library was pulled down, most of the statues on the west front were removed, and the stonework covered with Roman cement. After some structural work early in the 19th century by James Wyatt, the ornate west front was restored by Sir George Gilbert Scott. It includes many ornate carved figures of kings, queens and saints, created from original materials where possible and new imitations and additions when the originals were not available. Wyatt's choir-screen had utilised medieval stone-work which Scott in turn used to create the clergy's seats in the sanctuary. A new metal screen by Francis Skidmore and John Birnie Philip to designs by Scott was installed, as was a Minton tile pavement stretching from choir screen to altar, inspired by medieval tiles found in the Choir foundations.

== Practitioners ==
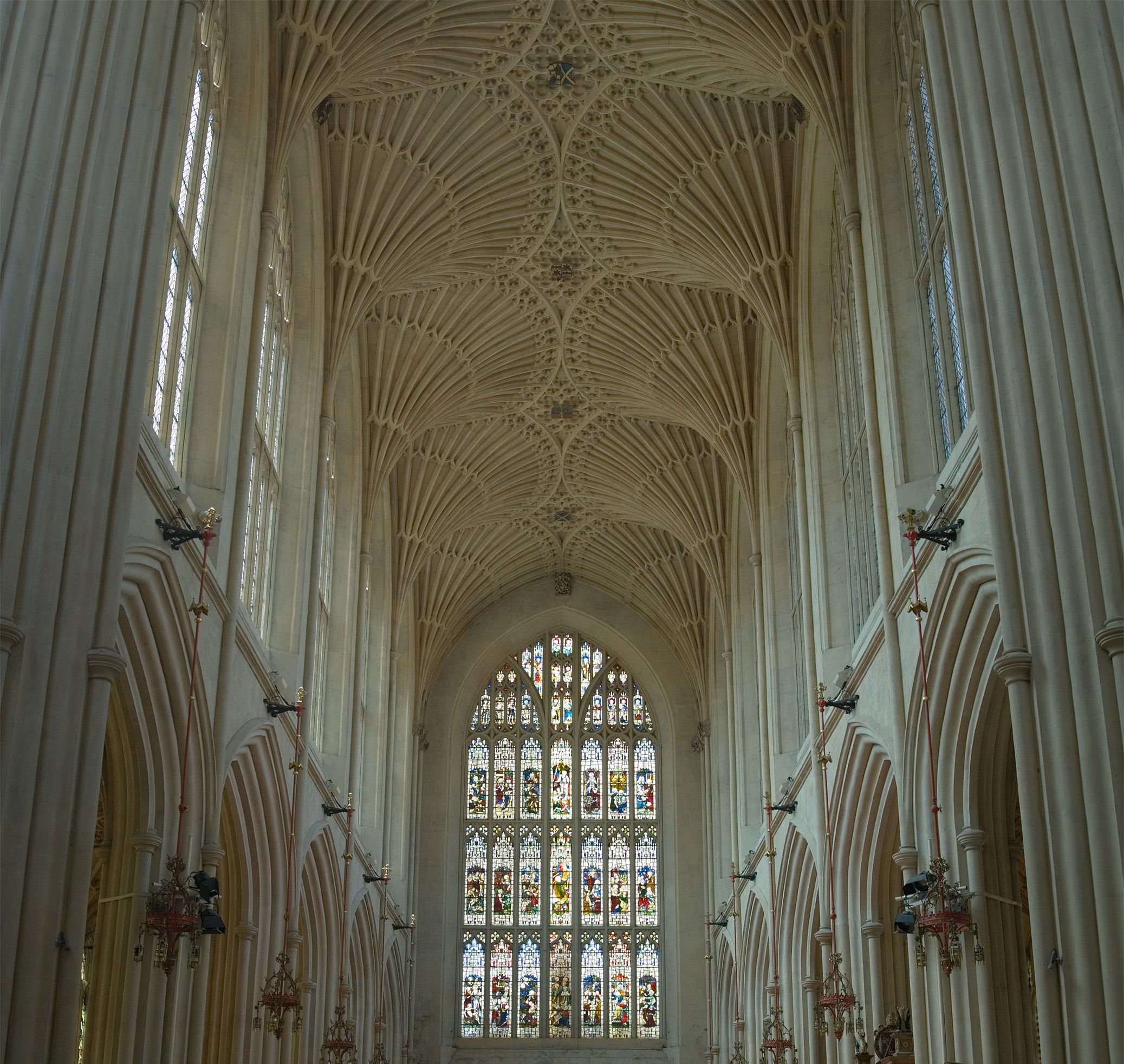
The nave of Bath Abbey – Scott's stone fan vaulting that replaced the 17th century plaster ceiling to complete the original design by Robert and William Vertue. At the same time, Scott changed the sculpture on the west front.

Famous architects such as George Gilbert Scott, Ewan Christian, William Butterfield and George Edmund Street became enthusiastic "restorers" and the wave of restoration spread across the country so that by 1875 something like 80% of all churches in England had been affected in some way.

In 1850 Scott wrote a book A plea for the faithful restoration of our Ancient Churches, in which he stated that "as a general rule it is highly desirable to preserve those vestiges of the growth and history of buildings which are indicated by the various styles and irregularities of its parts". However, he did not follow this principle in practice, generally sweeping away all later changes and reconstructing the church in a uniform early style, sometimes on the evidence of just one remaining early feature.

Equivalent movements existed in most of Europe, especially northern Europe, with the French architect and architectural historian Eugène Viollet-le-Duc especially associated with the French manifestation.

== Opposition ==
There were opponents. The Reverend John Louis Petit was a staunch and well-respected opponent from his first book, Remarks on Church Architecture (1841), until his death in 1868. The Archaeological Society was founded in 1845 by antiquarians anxious to bring the love of old buildings to a wider audience. Although John Ruskin was generally in favour of new buildings in an early Gothic style, in 1849 he wrote in The Seven Lamps of Architecture that it was not possible "to restore anything that has ever been great or beautiful in architecture". The Society of Antiquaries of London urged in 1855 that "no restoration should ever be attempted, otherwise than ... in the sense of preservation from further injuries".

A later vociferous opponent was William Morris who campaigned against the proposed restoration of St John the Baptist Church, Inglesham, in the 1880s and started the Society for the Protection of Ancient Buildings (SPAB) in 1877 when he heard of the proposed restoration of Tewkesbury Abbey by Scott. The principles espoused by SPAB took some time to attract support, but the policy of putting "Protection in place of Restoration" eventually took hold, and are adhered to today. Morris also wrote in 1877:

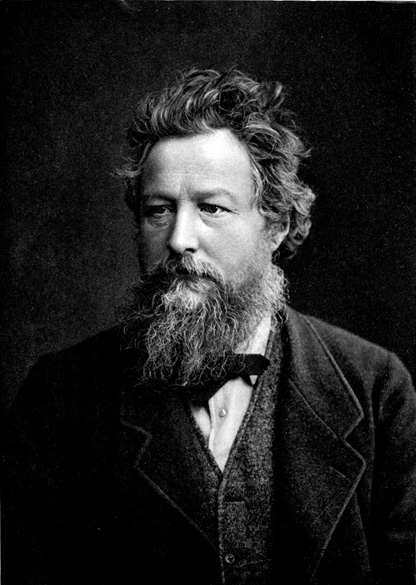
William Morris, who strongly opposed restoration

But of late years a great uprising of ecclesiastical zeal, coinciding with a great increase of study, and consequently of knowledge of medieval architecture has driven people into spending their money on these buildings, not merely with the purpose of repairing them, of keeping them safe, clean, and wind and water-tight, but also of "restoring" them to some ideal state of perfection; sweeping away if possible all signs of what has befallen them at least since the Reformation, and often since dates much earlier.

Despite his opposition, though, it is known that Morris profited greatly by his firm's provision of stained glass to many restoration projects, and it has been noted that his criticism only started after his firm was securely established as a supplier to these projects. But after 1880, in line with SPAB principles, the firm refused to accept stained glass commissions for historic ecclesiastical buildings.

Further opposition came from evangelical Protestants, who believed that "ornamental carved work, decorative painting, encaustic tiles, and stained glass were foolish vanities which lead the heart astray", and from others who were concerned about the cost: "For the cost of one stone church with a groined roof, or even an open timbered roof, two might be built in brick with plaster ceilings; and who could dare to say that worship in the plainer building would be less devout or sincere than that which was offered in the other?"

== In retrospect ==
The Church's Restoration
In eighteen-eighty-three
Has left for contemplation
Not what there used to be.

— From Hymn by John Betjeman,
parody of The Church's One Foundation
(traditional tune settings include
"Ellacombe" and "Aurelia").

From a 20th-century perspective the process of Victorian restoration has often been viewed unfavourably, with terms such as "ruthless", "insensitive" and "heavy-handed" being commonly used to describe the work done.

In the introduction to his book The Gothic Revival (first published in 1928), Kenneth Clark wrote "The real reason the Gothic Revival had been neglected is that it produced so little on which our eyes can rest without pain". Clark also reckoned that Decorated Gothic was the worst of the three possible styles that could have been adopted—the others being Early English which had "very little detail which an ordinary craftsman could not manage", and Perpendicular which was "infinitely the most adaptable of medieval styles". Clark pointed out that Decorated was the most difficult to execute, not least because of the complicated window tracery that set it apart from the other two Gothic styles.

However, not all restoration work was purely negative: a side effect of a number of restorations was the rediscovery of long-lost features, for instance Anglo-Saxon carving that had been incorporated into Norman foundations, or wall-paintings that had been whitewashed over, as at St Albans Cathedral. It is also true to say that had they not been restored many churches would have fallen into disrepair.

== Sources ==
- Clark, Kenneth (1962). The Gothic Revival (3rd ed.). New York: Holt, Rinehart & Winston.
- Eastlake, Charles L. (1872). A History of the Gothic Revival. London: Longmans, Green, and Co.
- Mari, Philippe (2010). "Architecture at the Service of Ideology: William Morris, the Anglican Church and the Destruction, Restoration and Protection of Medieval Architecture in Victorian England" (PDF). University of Montreal.
- Miele, Chris (1995). "Chapter 7. Their interest and habit: Professionalism and the Restoration of Medieval Churches, 1837–77". In Brooks, Chris (ed.). The Victorian Church: Architecture and Society. Manchester University Press. pp. 151–72. ISBN 0-7190-4019-1.
- Port, M. H. (2006). 600 New Churches: the Church Building Commission 1818–1856 (2nd ed.). Reading: Spire Books. ISBN 978-1-904965-08-4.
- Reed, Michael (1997). The Landscape of Britain: from the beginnings to 1914. Routledge. p. 338. ISBN 9780415157452.
- Victorian Churches blog
