= Listed buildings in Longnor, Staffordshire =

Longnor is a civil parish in the district of Staffordshire Moorlands, Staffordshire, England. It contains 33 listed buildings that are recorded in the National Heritage List for England. Of these, one is at Grade II*, the middle of the three grades, and the others are at Grade II, the lowest grade. The parish contains the village of Longnor and the surrounding area. Most of the listed buildings are houses and cottages in the village. The other listed buildings include a church and items in the churchyard, farmhouses and farm buildings, a wayside cross, a milestone, a milepost, public houses, a bridge, a chapel, and a market hall.

== Key ==
Grade	Criteria
II*	Particularly important buildings of more than special interest
II	Buildings of national importance and special interest

== Buildings ==
Name and location	Photograph	Date	Notes	Grade
The Cross; 53.18113°N 1.86916°W		15th or 16th century	The former wayside cross is in stone and about 1.2 metres (3 ft 11 in) high. It has a rectangular plan, and there is a jointed break.	II
8 Chapel Street; 53.18160°N 1.86891°W		1774	A stone house with quoins, a modillioned and moulded eaves cornice, and a roof of blue tiles and stone slates. There are three storeys and four bays. The two doorways are in the middle bays; the right doorway, formerly a window, has a moulded surround, and the left doorway has a moulded and quoined surround, and a dated and initialled keystone. The windows are sashes with raised surrounds.	II
Folds End Farmhouse; 53.18044°N 1.86582°W		17th century	The farmhouse was altered and extended in the 19th and 20th centuries. It is in stone with modillioned eaves, and has a blue tile roof with verge parapets. There are two storeys and an L-shaped plan, with a main range, a projecting gabled wing on the right, and later lean-to extensions. The doorway is in the angle, on the front is a single-light window, and above is a three-light chamfered mullioned and transomed window. At the rear are mullioned sash windows.	II
Milestone; 53.18124°N 1.86916°W		Early 18th century	The milestone has a square plan, with a later ball finial on the top. It is inscribed with pointing hands, and indicates the directions to Leek, Ashbourne, Buxton, and Bakewell.	II
1 and 2 The Square; 53.18152°N 1.86912°W		Late 18th century	A pair of houses, later shops, in stone with a blue tile roof. There are three storeys and two wide bays. In the ground floor are shop windows and two doorways, the left doorway with a moulded surround, a pulvinated frieze, and a cornice, and the right doorway with a plain surround and a cornice. In the upper floors are casement windows.	II
Bank Cottage; 53.18153°N 1.87017°W		Late 18th century	The cottage is in stone with quoins, a moulded eaves band, and a stone slate roof with a verge parapet on the right. There are two storeys and an attic, and a front of one bay. The windows are sashes, the window in the ground floor with a cornice.	II
Crewe and Harpur Arms Hotel and arch 53.18113°N 1.86885°W		Late 18th century	The public house was extended in the 19th century. It is in red brick with quoins and blue tile roofs. The earlier part has three storeys and two bays, and the later part to the left has two storeys and three bays. The later part contains a doorway with a round moulded arched head and a fanlight, and the windows in both parts are sashes. To the left of the public house is a stone segmental arch leading to the coach yard.	II
The Old Police House; 53.18199°N 1.86786°W		Late 18th century	A stone house with chamfered quoins, an eaves band, and a blue tile roof with verge parapets. There are three storeys and three bays. The central doorway has pilasters and a cornice. The windows are sashes, the window to the left of the doorway, previously a doorway, has a raised quoin surround and a cornice.	II
St Bartholomew's Church; 53.18189°N 1.86872°W		1780	The church is in stone with a blue tile roof, and consists of a nave and chancel in one unit, and a west tower. The tower has four stages, a round-arched west door with a rusticated surround, and an embattled parapet with pinnacles. Along the sides of the church are two tiers of round-arched windows, and at the east end is a Venetian window.	II*
Basset Memorial; 53.18180°N 1.86844°W		1799	The memorial is in the churchyard of St Bartholomew's Church, and is to the memory of Robert Basset. It is a chest tomb in stone on a plinth, and has apsidal ends, a moulded top slab, and an oval inscription panel.	II
Yewtree Grange Farmhouse; 53.19017°N 1.87612°W		1825	The farmhouse is in stone with a stone slate roof, three storeys and three bays. The doorway has a corbelled hood, and the windows are sashes, the window above the doorway with a hood mould. In the middle of the top floor is an oval plaque with the date and initials in low relief, and a decorative border.	II
1–3 Chapel Street; 53.18184°N 1.86916°W		Early 19th century	A row of three stone cottages with stone slate roofs. Each cottage has two storeys and one bays. No. 1 is lightly recessed, there is one replacement casement window, and the other windows are sashes.	II
4 and 5 Chapel Street; 53.18174°N 1.86910°W		Early 19th century	A pair of stone cottages with stone slate roofs. Each cottage has two storeys and one bays. The doorways are paired in the centre, and the windows are sashes.	II
6 Chapel Street; 53.18169°N 1.86906°W		Early 19th century	A stone cottage with a blue tile roof, it has two storeys and two bays. The doorway is in the right bay, and the windows are sashes.	II
3 The Square; 53.18150°N 1.86898°W		Early 19th century	A house and shop in stone with a moulded eaves band, and a blue tile roof with verge parapets on the left. There are three storeys and three bays, with the right corner canted. The house is to the left and has a Tuscan doorcase and sash windows. The shop has a shop window and a casement window above, in the canted corner is a doorway with a corbelled hood, and in the gable end is another shop window.	II
Coachman's House; 53.18098°N 1.86875°W		Early 19th century	The former coachman's house is at the rear of the Crewe and Harpur Arms public house. It is in stone and has a stone slate roof with verge parapets. There are two storeys and two bays. The central doorway has a hood mould, the windows are sashes, and to the right external steps lead up to an upper floor doorway.	II
Hillcrest; 53.18150°N 1.87051°W		Early 19th century	A stone cottage that has a blue tile roof with verge parapets. There are two storeys and three bays. The doorway has a hood, and the windows are sashes.	II
Horseshoe Inn; 53.18150°N 1.86940°W		Early 19th century	A private house, later a public house, it is in stone with quoins and a tile roof. There are three storeys and three bays. The central doorway has a corbelled hood, the windows are sashes, and in the top floor are two re-set datestones.	II
Leigh Cottage and Holmleigh; 53.18150°N 1.87069°W		Early 19th century	A pair of stone cottages with a blue tile roof and two storeys. Leigh Cottage, to the left, has one bay, and Holmleigh has two. The doorways have corbelled hoods, and the windows are sashes.	II
Longnor Bridge; 53.17924°N 1.87229°W	—	Early 19th century	The bridge carries Leek Road over the River Manifold. It is in stone, and consists of a single shallow arch. There is a string course and moulding, the carriageway, parapets and copings are slightly cambered, and the approach abutments are concave with piers.	II
Parrots Restaurant, 7 Chapel Street; 53.18166°N 1.86898°W		Early 19th century	A house, later a restaurant, it is in stone with a blue tile roof. There are three storeys and three bays. The central doorway has a chamfered head, to its left is a bay window, and the other windows are sashes.	II
Sheffield House and Cart Shed; 53.18159°N 1.87008°W		Early 19th century	The house is in stone with quoins, and it has a stone slate roof, hipped to the left, and with a verge parapet to the right. There are three storeys and three bays. The central doorway has a plain surround and a corbelled hood, and to the left are a shop window and a doorway with a quoined surround. The windows are sashes. To the right is a lower cart shed with a blue tile roof and two storeys. It contains a yard entry and a cart door, both with elliptical heads, and in the upper floor are two small windows.	II
The Cottage; 53.18180°N 1.86741°W		Early 19th century	The house is rendered, and has a blue tile roof with verge parapets. There are two storeys and three bays. The doorway has a hood, and the windows are sashes.	II
West Bank Cottage and shed 53.18141°N 1.87076°W		Early 19th century	The house and shed are in limestone with a blue tile roof. There are two storeys, the house has three bays, and the shed to the right has one bay. The central doorway has pilasters, impost mouldings to a segmental voussoir head, and a shallow open pediment hood, and above the doorway is a pierced quatrefoil frieze. The windows are sashes. The shed has a large door in the ground floor and a hay loft above.	II
West Bank House; 53.18154°N 1.87031°W		Early 19th century	A stone house on a plinth, with chamfered quoins and a blue tile roof with verge parapets. There are two storeys and four bays. Steps lead up to the doorway which has pilasters, a fanlight, a decorated frieze, and a cornice. The windows are sashes with raised surrounds, those in the ground floor with cornices.	II
Windy Arbour Bridge; 53.17837°N 1.86962°W	—	Early 19th century	The bridge carries the B5053 road over the River Manifold. It is in stone, and consists of a single shallow arch. The bridge has a rounded string course, horizontal parapets and copings, and the approach abutments are concave and lead to piers.	II
Charlesworth Memorial; 53.18178°N 1.86886°W		1842	The memorial is in the churchyard of St Bartholomew's Church, and is to the memory of James Charlesworth. It is a chest tomb in stone, and consists of a sarcophagus with ball feet on a moulded plinth, with a moulded surbase, and a concave top hipped up to an urn finial. It is in an enclosure that has iron railings with foliage heads.	II
Gauledge Farmhouse and stable 53.18207°N 1.87407°W		Mid-19th century	The building is in stone with a raised eaves band, a blue tile roof, and two storeys. The house has three bays, a central doorway with a corbelled hood, and sash windows. To the left is a stable and a hay loft.	II
The Grapes; 53.18148°N 1.86845°W		Mid-19th century	A public house with an earlier core, it is in stone on a plinth, with string courses, a parapet, and a blue tile roof. There are three storeys and three bays. Steps lead up to the central doorway that has a round-arched head, pilasters, a fanlight, and a corbelled hood. In the ground floor are projecting casement windows on corbels. and in the upper floors are sash windows. At the rear is a narrow three-storey stair window.	II
Wesleyan Chapel and railings 53.18178°N 1.86934°W		1853	The chapel is in stone with chamfered quoins and a blue tile roof. The entrance front is gabled with two storeys, two bays, and a pediment with a moulded cornice. In the centre are double doors with an architrave and a cornice. The windows in the ground floor are round-headed on corbelled sills, and in the upper floor they are square. In front of the chapel are iron spear-head railings.	II
The Market Hall; 53.18148°N 1.86862°W		1873	The market hall is in stone, and has a blue tile roof with verge parapets. There is one storey and a front of three bays. The middle bay projects and has a cusped shaped gable with ball and obelisk finials, and it contains a coat of arms, armorial emblems, a datestone, and a painted plaque. Below is a round-arched entrance with a moulded surround, imposts, and a doorway with a fanlight. The outer bays contain three-light mullioned windows, above which are modillions, a frieze, a cornice, and a parapet with ball finials. In the gable ends are round-headed windows.	II
Milepost; 53.18791°N 1.87670°W		Early 20th century	The milepost is at a junction on the B5053 road. It is in cast iron, and has a triangular plan and a sloping top. On the top is "LONGNOR", and on the sides are the distances to Buxton, Longnor, Warslow, Onecote, Ipstones, Froghall, and Cheadle.	II
Gatepiers and gates, St Bartholomew's Church; 53.18197°N 1.86919°W		Undated	At the entrance to the churchyard are two gate piers in rusticated stone, they have a square section, and are about 2 metres (6 ft 7 in) high. Each pier has a moulded surbase and an oval fruit finial. Between the piers are iron gates, and a wrought iron overthrow with a crested finial.	II

== See also ==
- Listed buildings in Hartington Middle Quarter
- Listed buildings in Sheen, Staffordshire
- Listed buildings in Heathylee
- Listed buildings in Hollinsclough
