= Mermaid's Pool =

Mermaid's Pool may refer to:

- Mermaid's Pool (Peak District), a tarn in the moors of Derbyshire, England
- Mermaid's Pool (Devon), a pool on the shore platform in Devon, England

== See also ==
- Mermaid Pool, in Manly Vale, Sydney, Australia
- Mermaid Pool, in Matapouri, New Zealand
- Mermaid's Pond, a small lake in Staffordshire, England
- Mermaid Waters, Queensland, a suburb in Australia
