= Listed buildings in Sheen, Staffordshire =

Sheen is a civil parish in the district of Staffordshire Moorlands, Staffordshire, England. It contains 37 listed buildings that are recorded in the National Heritage List for England. Of these, four are at Grade II*, the middle of the three grades, and the others are at Grade II, the lowest grade. Apart from the village of Sheen and smaller settlements, the parish is rural. Most of the listed buildings are farmhouses and farm buildings, houses and associated structures, and cottages. The other listed buildings are a church, a memorial in the churchyard, two crosses, a road bridge, the entrance to a former country house which has been demolished, a former school, and a milepost.

== Key ==
Grade	Criteria
II*	Particularly important buildings of more than special interest
II	Buildings of national importance and special interest

== Buildings ==
Name and location	Photograph	Date	Notes	Grade
St Luke's Church, gargoyles and effigy 53.15055°N 1.83203°W		14th century	The church was largely rebuilt from 1850, first by C. W. Burleigh, followed by William Butterfield. It is built in stone with a blue slate roof, and consists of a nave, a south porch, a chancel, a north vestry, and a west tower. The tower has three stages, angle buttresses, a frieze parapet with gargoyles, and a short recessed lead-covered pyramidal spire. Outside the east end of the church is an effigy, and on the north side are gargoyles moved from elsewhere.	II*
Knowsley Cross; 53.17298°N 1.84741°W		15th century (possible)	The cross, which was restored in 1897, is in gritstone. It consists of a rough-hewn square base block and a short slightly tapered square shaft standing on a 19th-century base of three inscribed steps.	II
Village cross and corner posts 53.15027°N 1.83270°W		15th century (possible)	The cross has a medieval base, and the upper parts date from the 19th century. The plinth is on five square steps, it has angle spurs, and on it is a square tapering shaft, at the top of which is a small cross. The corner posts are in cast iron.	II
New House Farm and gate piers 53.14824°N 1.84939°W		1646	The farmhouse, which was rebuilt in 1830, is in stone with chamfered quoins, a moulded eaves cornice, and a blue tile roof with verge parapets. There are three storeys, and a T-shaped plan, with a front range of three bays, a large rear wing, and a single-storey lean-to. The doorway has a moulded surround, an arched head, and a fanlight. The windows are sashes, and in the middle of the top floor is an oval inscribed panel. The gate piers are about 1.5 metres (4 ft 11 in) high, and each has a moulded surbase and a ball finial.	II
Beresford Manor; 53.13596°N 1.82458°W	—	17th century	A manor house that was extended in the 19th century, it is in stone with a tile roof and two storeys. There is an L-shaped plan, with a 17th-century range, and a 19th-century cross-wing. The original part has a string course, modillion eaves, and three bays. The doorway has a Tudor arched head, to the right is a canted bay window with an embattled parapet, and the other windows are sashes. The cross-wing is taller, with moulded eaves, a hipped roof, chamfered quoins, and a two-storey canted bay window.	II
Broadmeadow Hall; 53.16713°N 1.83167°W		Mid-17th century	The farmhouse is in stone with moulded string courses, and a blue tile roof with verge parapets and ball finials. There are two storeys and an attic, an L-shaped plan, and an entrance front of two gabled bays. The windows are chamfered, mullioned, and transomed, and the doorway has a round-arched head, a cabled surround and a fanlight. At the rear is a gabled stair turret and a later lean-to.	II*
Barn and stable north west of Broadmeadow Hall; 53.16718°N 1.83185°W		17th century	The barn and stable were largely rebuilt in the 19th century. They are in stone with quoins and a blue tile roof. There are two levels, and in the gable end is a vent over an opening with a Tudor arched lintel and a hood mould. The building is about 20 metres (66 ft) long, and the front contains a simpler Tudor arched doorway, casement windows, and two hay loft doors.	II
High Sheen Farmhouse and stables 53.15905°N 1.83511°W	—	17th century	The building was altered and extended in the 19th and 20th centuries. It is in stone, the house has a slate roof, and elsewhere the roofs are tiled. The house has two storeys, three bays, and a single-storey gabled projection in the centre. The windows vary; some have chamfered surrounds, some have aluminium surrounds, some are casements, and others are sashes. Attached are two stables with sash windows, hay loft openings, and a vented door.	II
Scaldersitch Farmhouse; 53.13640°N 1.83264°W	—	1661	Much of the farmhouse was rebuilt in the 19th century. It is in stone and has a blue tile roof with verge parapets and a fleur-de-lys finial. There are two storeys, four bays, and a short rear wing. The doorway has a Tudor arched head and a dated lintel, and the windows are sash windows with mullions, one replaced by a casement window.	II
1 Staffordshire Knot Cottages; 53.14688°N 1.83559°W	—	1666	The house, which was remodelled in the 19th century, is in stone, and has a blue tile roof with a verge parapet to the left. There are two storeys and two bays. The doorway has a Tudor arched head with a dated lintel, and the windows are two-light mullioned sashes.	II
Palace Farmhouse; 53.14951°N 1.83250°W	—	1673	The farmhouse, which was substantially rebuilt in the 19th century, is in stone and has a tile roof with verge parapets. There are two storeys and four bays, the left bay recessed. The doorway has a Tudor arched head, a dated lintel, and a stepped moulded hood mould, and the windows are sashes with mullions.	II
Field Barn north of Manor Farm; 53.15258°N 1.83222°W	—	Late 17th century	A cottage, later a barn, it is in stone and without a roof. There are two storeys and it contains a two-light window and a Tudor arched doorway.	II
Barn northwest of Low End Farmhouse; 53.14012°N 1.84161°W	—	1676	The barn and byre were restored in the 19th century. The building is in stone with a blue tile roof, two levels, and three bays. It contains two doorways with Tudor arched heads, vent slits, and casement windows. Inside, there are three raised cruck trusses.	II
Barn south of Rose Cottage; 53.14721°N 1.84905°W	—	1688	A stone barn that has a blue tile roof with verge parapets, two levels and three bays. On the front are two entrances, one with a Tudor arched head, a sash window, two pitching doors, and slit vents. There is another Tudor-arched entrance at the rear, this with a dated lintel.	II
Hillside Cottage; 53.14761°N 1.84928°W	—	Early 18th century	The cottage is in stone, and has a blue tile roof with verge parapets and shaped kneelers. There are two storeys and one bay. Above the door is a hood, and the windows are mullioned.	II
Ridge End Farmhouse; 53.16104°N 1.85473°W	—	1744	A stone farmhouse with a blue tile roof, two storeys, and three bays. The doorway has an elliptical head, above it is a datestone, and the windows are mullioned casements.	II
2 Staffordshire Knot Cottages; 53.14692°N 1.83555°W	—	Mid-18th century	A stone house that was altered and extended in the 20th century, it has a slate roof with verge parapets on shaped kneelers. There are two storeys and one bay. On the front is a lean-to porch, and the windows are mullioned casements.	II
Plum Tree Cottage; 53.14753°N 1.84925°W		18th century	A stone cottage that has a blue tile roof with verge parapets. There are two storeys and one bay. The doorway has a Tudor arched head, and the windows have two lights and mullions.	II
Bridge over River Manifold; 53.13054°N 1.84301°W		Early 19th century	The bridge carries the B5054 road over the River Manifold. It is in stone and consists of a single shallow arch on an impost band. There is a string course at carriageway level with moulding above, and the parapet and coping are cambered over the span.	II
Cross Farmhouse; 53.15030°N 1.83320°W	—	Early 19th century	The farmhouse, which has an earlier core, is in stone with a moulded string course, and has a tile roof with verge parapets. There are two storeys, and L-shaped plan, and two bays, the right bay gabled and projecting. The windows are sashes.	II
Stable, cart shed and hay loft southwest of Cross Farmhouse; 53.15022°N 1.83343°W	—	Early 19th century	The building is in stone with a stone slate roof, it has two levels, and the stable is on the left. The stable contains a doorway and casement windows, to the right are external steps leading up to a granary door, and further to the right are two cart entries with elliptical heads, and a loft opening.	II
Stable north of Low End Farmhouse; 53.13930°N 1.84122°W	—	Early 19th century	The stable and hayloft incorporate some earlier material, including a datestone. The building is in stone and has a blue tile roof with moulded verge parapets on shaped kneelers. The front is gabled, with two storeys, and is flanked by a lean-to on both sides. There is a Tudor arched doorway with a dated lintel, and external steps leading to the hayloft. Under the steps and to the right are further doorways, and in the gable apex is a dovecote with six boxes and three ledges.	II
Lower Boothlow Farmhouse; 53.16571°N 1.85668°W		Early 19th century	The farmhouse is in stone with a stone slate roof. There are three storeys, and an L-shaped plan, with a main range of two bays, and a rear outshut. The central doorway has a corbelled hood, and the windows are sashes.	II
Manor Farmhouse; 53.15171°N 1.83187°W	—	Early 19th century	The farmhouse is in stone, and has a blue tile roof and verge parapets. There are two storeys, a front of three bays, and a two-bay rear wing. The doorway has reeded pilasters with fleurons at the angles, and a hood, and the windows are sashes.	II
Over Boothlow Farmhouse; 53.17003°N 1.85672°W		Early 19th century	A stone farmhouse that has a blue tile roof with verge parapets. There are three storeys and three bays. The central doorway has a fanlight and a hood mould, and the windows are sashes.	II
Stable east of Plum Tree Cottage; 53.14758°N 1.84904°W	—	Early 19th century	The stable is in stone with a blue tile roof, a single storey with a loft, and two bays. On the front are two stable doors, and two top-hung casement windows. The right gable end has external steps leading to a hay loft, and on the left side is a lean-to.	II
Stable and Barn southwest of Rose Cottage; 53.14732°N 1.84920°W	—	Early 19th century	The stable and barn are in stone and have a blue tile roof with verge parapets. The barn has a single cell, with a catslide roof to the stable. On the front facing the drive are two windows and a stable door, all elliptically-arched.	II
The Raikes Farmhouse and stables 53.13467°N 1.82415°W	—	Early 19th century	The farmhouse and stables are in stone with a blue tile roof. The farmhouse has two storeys and three bays. On the front is a porch with a hipped roof, and the windows are sashes. The stables to the left contain a doorway, a sash window, and a hay loft door.	II
Rose Cottage; 53.14749°N 1.84895°W	—	1826	The cottage, which contains earlier material, is in stone, and has a stone flag roof. There are two storeys and two bays. The central doorway is dated, the windows are top-hung casements, and at the rear is a Tudor arched doorway.	II
Harris Close; 53.15736°N 1.82658°W	—	1842	A stone farmhouse that has a blue tile roof with verge parapets, two storeys, and two bays. The central doorway has corbelled hood, above it is a datestone, and the windows have four panes; the door and windows have chamfered quoin surrounds.	II
Gate piers, gates and approaches, Beresford Hall; 53.13404°N 1.82436°W		Mid-19th century	The entrance was to Beresford Hall, which has been demolished. It consists of two square stone gate piers about 2.5 metres (8 ft 2 in) high. Each pier has a moulded surbase to a ball finial. The gates are in cast iron.	II
Barn southeast of Palace Farmhouse; 53.14923°N 1.83236°W	—	Mid-19th century	The barn and shippon, which has retained some 18th-century material, is in stone, and has a blue tile roof with verge parapets. There are two levels, and it contains four hay loft doors, five casement windows, and a doorway, and at the left end is a 20th-century lean-to.	II
School and School House; 53.15016°N 1.83221°W		1851	The school and the school house to the right are in stone with blue tile roofs, and are in Gothic style. The school has a single storey with the gable end facing the road. This contains two pairs of trefoil-headed windows and a similar single window above. The school house has one storey and an attic, and two bays, the right bay gabled and projecting, In the angle is a porch, the windows are small-pane mullioned casements, and in the left bay is a gabled half-dormer.	II
The Old Rectory; 53.14989°N 1.83202°W	—	c. 1852	The former rectory, which was designed by William Butterfield in Gothic style, is in stone and has a half-hipped blue tile roof, with crested ridge tiles. The entrance front has five bays, and consists of a block with two storeys and an attic to the left, a block with one storey and an attic to the right, and between is a lower polygonal stair turret. On the front is a lean-to porch, and the windows vary; some arr mullioned casements with hood moulds, some have trefoil heads, and there is a dormer. On the garden front is a two-storey bay window, the lower storey canted, the upper storey square on corbels.	II*
Former Old Rectory Coach House; 53.14972°N 1.83228°W	—	c. 1852	The coach house, designed by William Butterfield, has been altered, extended, and used for other purposes. It is in stone and has a steeply pitched tile roof. There is one storey with flanking walls, and a central stair turret with a steeply pitched conical roof.	II
Critchlow Memorial and railings 53.15044°N 1.83186°W	—	c. 1852	The memorial is in the churchyard of St Luke's Church, and is to the memory of members of the Critchlow family. It is in stone, and consists of a large chest tomb in Gothic style, about 2 metres (6 ft 7 in) high. The tomb has a deep plinth, carved gabletted pilasters framing inscribed panels, a blind arcaded frieze, a moulded cornice, and a pitched and hipped block top. The tomb is enclosed by wrought iron railings that rise to form round arches over it.	II*
Milepost 1 mile from Hartington; 53.13347°N 1.82740°W		Early 20th century	The milepost is on the south side of the B5054 road. It is in cast iron, and has a triangular plan and a sloping top. On the top is "SHEEN", and on the sides are the distances to Sheen, Warslow, Leek, and Hartington.	II

== See also ==
- Listed buildings in Longnor, Staffordshire
- Listed buildings in Hartington Town Quarter
- Listed buildings in Alstonefield
- Listed buildings in Fawfieldhead
- Listed buildings in Heathylee
