= Listed buildings in Hollinsclough =

Hollinsclough is a civil parish in the district of Staffordshire Moorlands, Staffordshire, England. It contains six listed buildings that are recorded in the National Heritage List for England. Of these, one is at Grade II*, the middle of the three grades, and the others are at Grade II, the lowest grade. The parish contains the village of Hollinsclough and the surrounding countryside. The listed buildings consist of farmhouses and farm buildings, a house and associated structures, a chapel, and a church with an attached school.

== Key ==
Grade	Criteria
II*	Particularly important buildings of more than special interest
II	Buildings of national importance and special interest

== Buildings ==
Name and location	Photograph	Date	Notes	Grade
Edgetop Farmhouse, stables and cartshed 53.19416°N 1.92836°W	—	1787	The building is in stone with quoins, and has a blue tile roof with a verge parapet on the right. There are two storeys, the house has two bays, and a recessed wing to the right containing a doorway. The windows are casements, those in the ground floor with lintels, and on the front is a datestone. To the left are the stables that contain doorways, a circular pitching hole and a loft door, and on the left is a projecting wing containing a cartshed entry with an elliptical arch.	II
Bethel Chapel; 53.19608°N 1.90412°W		1801	The chapel is in stone with quoins and a stone slate roof. The entrance front is gabled and has three bays. The central round-headed doorway has a Gibbs surround, and above it is a painted inscription. The windows have round heads, raised surrounds, imposts, and keystones. In the gable is a blind oeil-de-boeuf window, and on the apex is a ball finial.	II
Home Farmhouse; 53.19560°N 1.90466°W	—	Early 19th century	The farmhouse is in stone with a tile roof, and has three storeys and three bays. On the front is a doorway, there is one casement window, and the other windows are sashes.	II
Moor Top Farmhouse and farm buildings 53.19724°N 1.91652°W	—	Early 19th century	The farmhouse is in stone with quoins and a stone slate roof. There are two storeys, two parallel ranges, and a front of four bays. In the centre is a flat-roofed porch, and the windows are sashes. To the left is a two-bay farm building.	II
The Homestead and farm buildings 53.19612°N 1.90459°W	—	Early 19th century	The buildings are in stone, the farmhouse has a tile roof, and the farm buildings have a stone slate roof. They all have two storeys, the farmhouse has two bays, a porch, and sash windows. The farm buildings to the right have four bays, and contain doorways, a cart entrance with an elliptical arch, and square loft doors.	II
Vicarage Cottage, wall and gate piers 53.19603°N 1.90390°W		Early to mid 19th century	The house is in stone, and has a stone slate roof with coped verges on kneelers. There are two storeys and four bays. The doorway has a quoined surround and a bracketed hood, and the windows are sashes. In front of the garden is a low bowed wall about 150 millimetres (5.9 in) high with rounded capping. The wall ranges up to gate piers that have shaped capping.	II
St Agnes' Church; 53.19608°N 1.90316°W		1840	A church and an attached school, later used for other purposes, they are in stone and have a stone slate roof with verge parapets and ball and block pinnacles at the kneelers and the apex. The two-storey single-bay school is to the left, to its right is a projecting two-storey gabled porch, the church further to the right has two bays and a single storey. On the roof is a louvred cupola with a pyramidal roof. At the east end is a gabled bay window with three lights and pinnacles.	II*

== See also ==
- Listed buildings in Longnor
- Listed buildings in Quarnford
- Listed buildings in Heathylee
