= Benjamin Webb (clergyman) =

English clergyman (1819–1885)

Benjamin Webb (28 November 1819 – 27 November 1885) was an English clergyman and co-founder of the Cambridge Camden Society; he was known as a leading authority on questions of ecclesiastical art.

== Life ==
Webb was born in London at Addle Hill, Doctor's Commons, on 28 November 1819, eldest son of Benjamin Webb, of the firm of Webb & Sons, wheelwrights. In 1828 he was admitted to St Paul's School under Dr John Sleath, and proceeded with an exhibition to Trinity College, Cambridge, in October 1838. He graduated B.A. in 1842, M.A. in 1845.

While still an undergraduate he, together with his somewhat older friend, John Mason Neale, founded the Cambridge Camden Society, which played an important part in the ecclesiological revival consequent upon the Tractarian movement, and of which Webb continued to be secretary, both at Cambridge and afterwards in London (where it continued from 1848 under the name of the Ecclesiological Society), from its beginning to its extinction in 1863. With Webb and Neale were associated in this enterprise Webb's lifelong friend Alexander Beresford Hope and Frederick Apthorp Paley. The society restored the Round Church at Cambridge, and Webb had the honour of showing the restored edifice to the poet Wordsworth.

Webb was early recognised as a leading authority on questions of ecclesiastical art. He was ordained deacon in 1842 and priest in 1843, and served as curate first under his college tutor, Thomas Thorp (who had been the first president of the Cambridge Camden Society), at Kemerton in Gloucestershire, and afterwards at Brasted in Kent, under William Hodge Mill, who, as Regius Professor of Hebrew, had countenanced and encouraged his ecclesiological work at Cambridge, and whose daughter he married in 1847. He was also for a while curate to William Dodsworth at Christ Church, Albany Street.

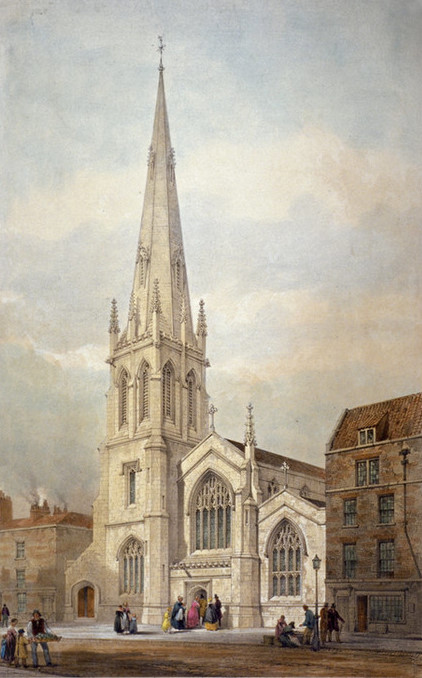
St Andrew's Church, Wells Street, London

Beresford Hope was heir to an estate in Sheen in Staffordshire, and he rebuilt St Luke's Church at Sheen; in 1851 he presented Webb to the perpetual curacy of the village. Webb was reluctant to accept the living because of the remoteness of the area, and resigned in 1862.

In that year Lord Palmerston, on the recommendation of Mr Gladstone, gave him the crown living of St Andrew's, Wells Street, London, which he retained till his death. Under him the church obtained a wide celebrity for the musical excellence of its services, and became the centre of an elaborate and efficient system of confraternities, schools, and parochial institutions, in establishing which his powers of practical organisation found a congenial field of exercise.

Webb was appointed by Bishop Jackson of London in 1881 to the Prebend of Portpool in St Paul's Cathedral. From 1881 to his death he was editor of The Church Quarterly Review.

He died at his house in Chandos Street, Cavendish Square, on 27 November 1885, and was buried in the churchyard of Aldenham in Hertfordshire. A monument by Henry Hugh Armstead was placed to his memory in the crypt of St Paul's.

Clement Charles Julian Webb wrote: "Webb was throughout his life a consistent high-churchman, although his policy in matters of ritual differed from that of many of his party.... His refined artistic culture, and his deep conviction that the best of everything should be offered in God's service, prevented him from sharing the prejudice felt by many who otherwise agreed with him against the performance of elaborate modern music in church."

== Publications ==
He published:

- Sketches of Continental Ecclesiology (1847)
- Notes illustrative of the Parish of Sheen (a supplement to the "Lichfield Diocesan Church Calendar", 1859)
- Instructions and Prayers for Candidates for Confirmation (3rd edition 1882)

He contributed numerous articles in The Ecclesiologist, Christian Remembrancer, and Saturday Review.

He was joint author (with J. M. Neale) of an "Essay on Symbolism" and a translation of Durandus (1843); editor of Dr W. H. Mill's Catechetical Lectures (1856), of the second edition of his Mythical Interpretation of the Gospels (1861), and of his Sermons on the Temptation (1873); joint editor of Richard Montagu's Articles of Inquiry (1841), of Mark Frank's Sermons in the Anglo-Catholic Library, and (with William Cooke) of the Hymnary (1870–2); and one of the editors of Hierurgia Anglicana (1848), the Hymnal Noted (1852), and the Burntisland reprint of the Sarum Missal (1861–83). One of the more well known hymns that he translated was "A Hymn of Glory Let Sing" — a translation of "Hymnum canamus gloriae" (Note: other manuscripts of this hymn not used by Webb read "Hymnum canamus Domino") which is attributed to Bede. The hymn is used for celebrating the Ascension.

== See also ==
- Cambridge Movement
