= Sheen, Staffordshire =

Village in Staffordshire, England

Coordinates: 53.1505°N 1.8321°W

Sheen
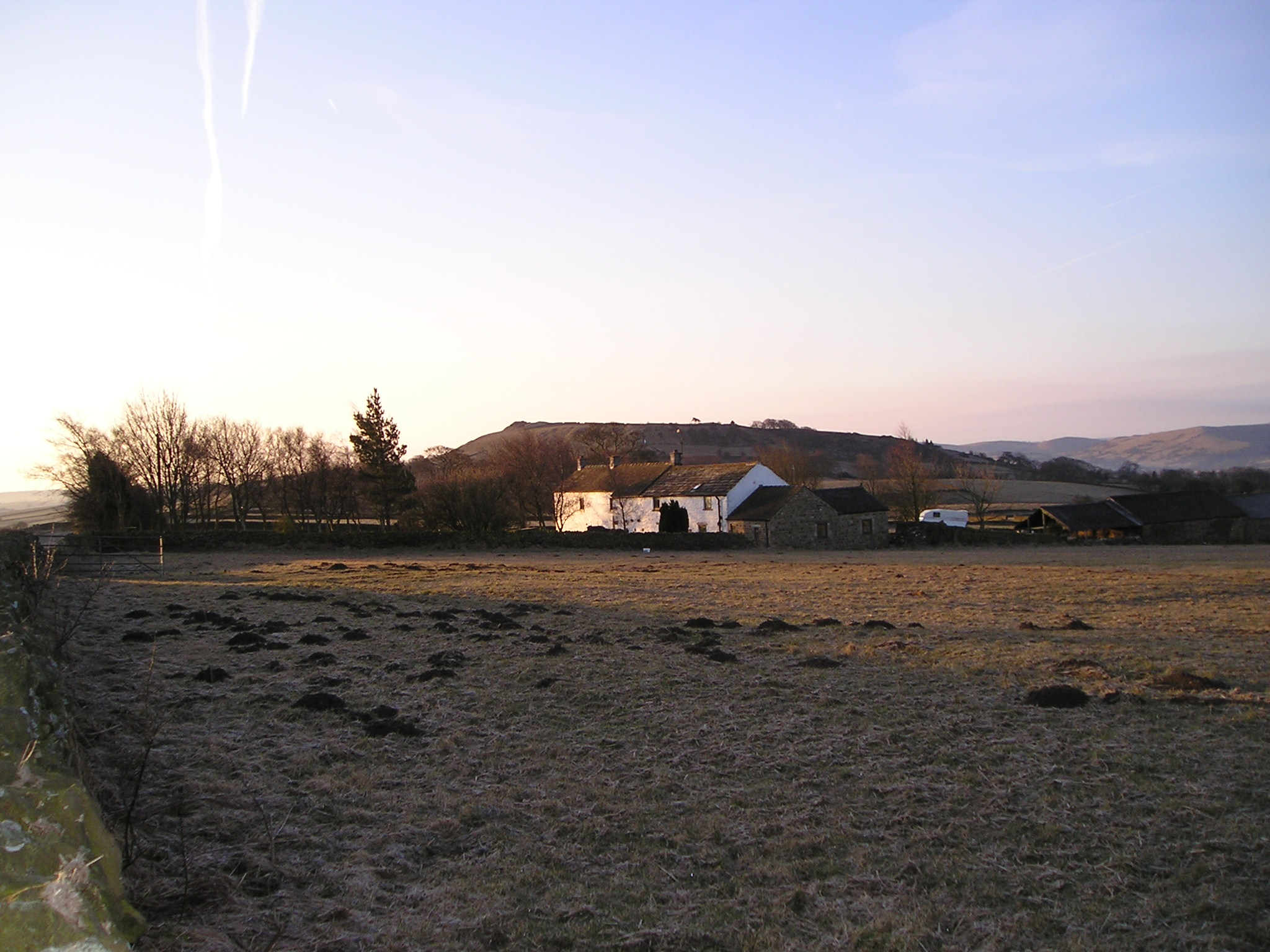
- Looking south towards Top Farm, with Sheen Hill beyond

- Location within Staffordshire
- Population: 234 (2011 census)
- OS grid reference: SK 114 615
- Civil parish: Sheen
- District: Staffordshire Moorlands
- Shire county: Staffordshire
- Region: West Midlands
- Country: England
- Sovereign state: United Kingdom
- Post town: Buxton
- Postcode district: SK17
- Police: Staffordshire
- Fire: Staffordshire
- Ambulance: West Midlands
- UK Parliament: Staffordshire Moorlands

Sheen is a village and civil parish in the Staffordshire Moorlands district, in north-east Staffordshire, England. In 2011 the parish had a population of 234.

The parish is about 3.5 miles (5.6 km) north to south and about 2 miles (3.2 km) east to west. The eastern boundary is the River Dove (the boundary with Derbyshire), and the western boundary is the River Manifold.

There is a north-west to south-east ridge forming Sheen Moor; the village of Sheen, on a road running north–south through the parish, is near the southern end of the ridge. The highest point, at 380 metres (1,250 ft), is Sheen Hill. Hulme End, near the southern boundary, has height 271 metres (889 ft); Knowsley, near the northern boundary, has height 340 metres (1,120 ft). There is a steep escarpment to the River Dove in the east, and the ground falls less steeply to the River Manifold in the west. There is scattered settlement throughout the parish.

The parish was described in 1851: "The face of the country is here wild and romantic, but the soil about the village is fertile and well enclosed."

== History ==
The name Sheen may come from Old English sceon: shelters (perhaps herdsmen's shelters); or Old English sceone: beautiful.

=== Prehistoric ===
There are three Bronze Age bowl barrows. Brund Low, near crossroads 640 metres (700 yd) north of the hamlet of Brund, is about 1.7 metres (5.6 ft) high and about 40 metres (130 ft) across; excavations in the 19th century found human cremations and flint and bronze artifacts. Rye Low, a short distance east of Brund, is about 1.5 metres (4.9 ft) high and about 35 metres (115 ft) across; excavations found deposits of vegetation and insects, also cremated bones and flint artifacts. A barrow near buildings south of Townend is about 0.8 metres (2.6 ft) high and about 25 metres (82 ft) across; cremations and flint artifacts have been found.

=== Church ===
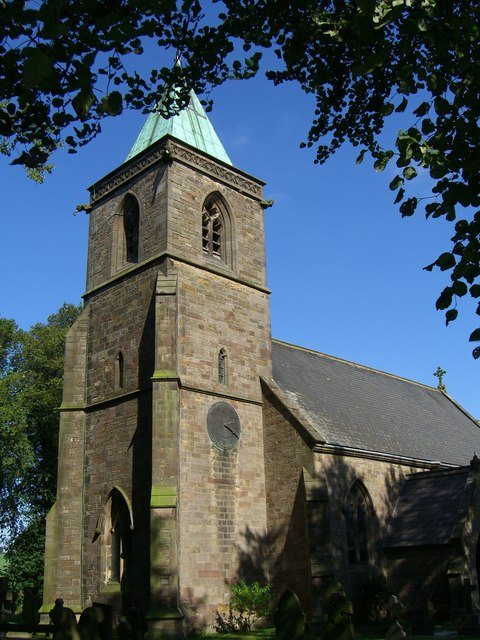
St Luke's Church, Sheen

There was a chapel at Sheen by 1185. The present Church of St Luke at Sheen, presumably on the same site, is a Grade II* listed building. Its origins are of the 14th century; it was mostly rebuilt between 1828 and 1832, using stone from Sheen Hill. The church was later described as "a well meant but wholly unecclesiastical structure". A. J. B. Hope offered to rebuild it at his own expense; the new church, designed by C. W. Burleigh and later by William Butterfield, was consecrated in 1852.

=== A. J. B. Hope ===
In about 1850 Sir Alexander James Beresford Beresford Hope, known as A. J. B. Hope, inherited the Beresford estate, which was mostly in Alstonefield, extending into Sheen. He wanted to make Sheen "the Athens of the Moorlands". He rebuilt the church, and built a new house for the incumbent to the design of William Butterfield. He also built a school with house attached, on glebe land south of the church, and a lending library and reading room, which was opened in 1856. (It closed, for lack of support, in 1889.) It was remarked in The Ecclesiologist that "the general effect is that of an ecclesiastical colony in the wilds of Australia". Not all Hope's plans were realized.

=== Buildings ===
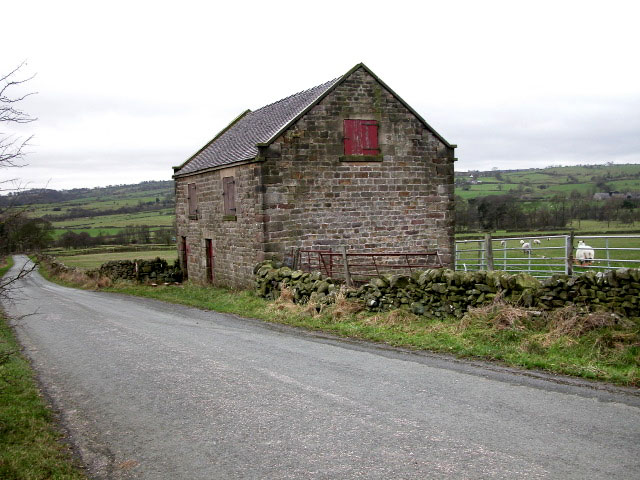
Barn north of Brund, in the west of the parish

At Knowsley in the north of the parish is the shaft of a stone cross, 15th-century or later. It was re-erected near its former site in 1897.

Broadmeadow Hall, near the River Dove, is a stone farmhouse of the mid-17th century, a Grade II* listed building. It was restored in the 19th century, and in the early 1990s. There was a house here by 1573, when it was acquired by the Sleigh family. During the 17th century it became the manor house of Sheen, until 1709 when Gervase Sleigh sold the manor.

The Staffordshire Knot, an inn in Sheen, has had the name since before 1872. In the mid-19th century its name was The Horse Shoe, and was run by John Woolley, a blacksmith.

Beresford Manor, in the south-east of the parish, dates from the 17th century, with early 19th-century additions.

== See also ==
- Listed buildings in Sheen, Staffordshire
