= St Bartholomew's Church, Longnor =

Church of St Bartholomew, Longnor
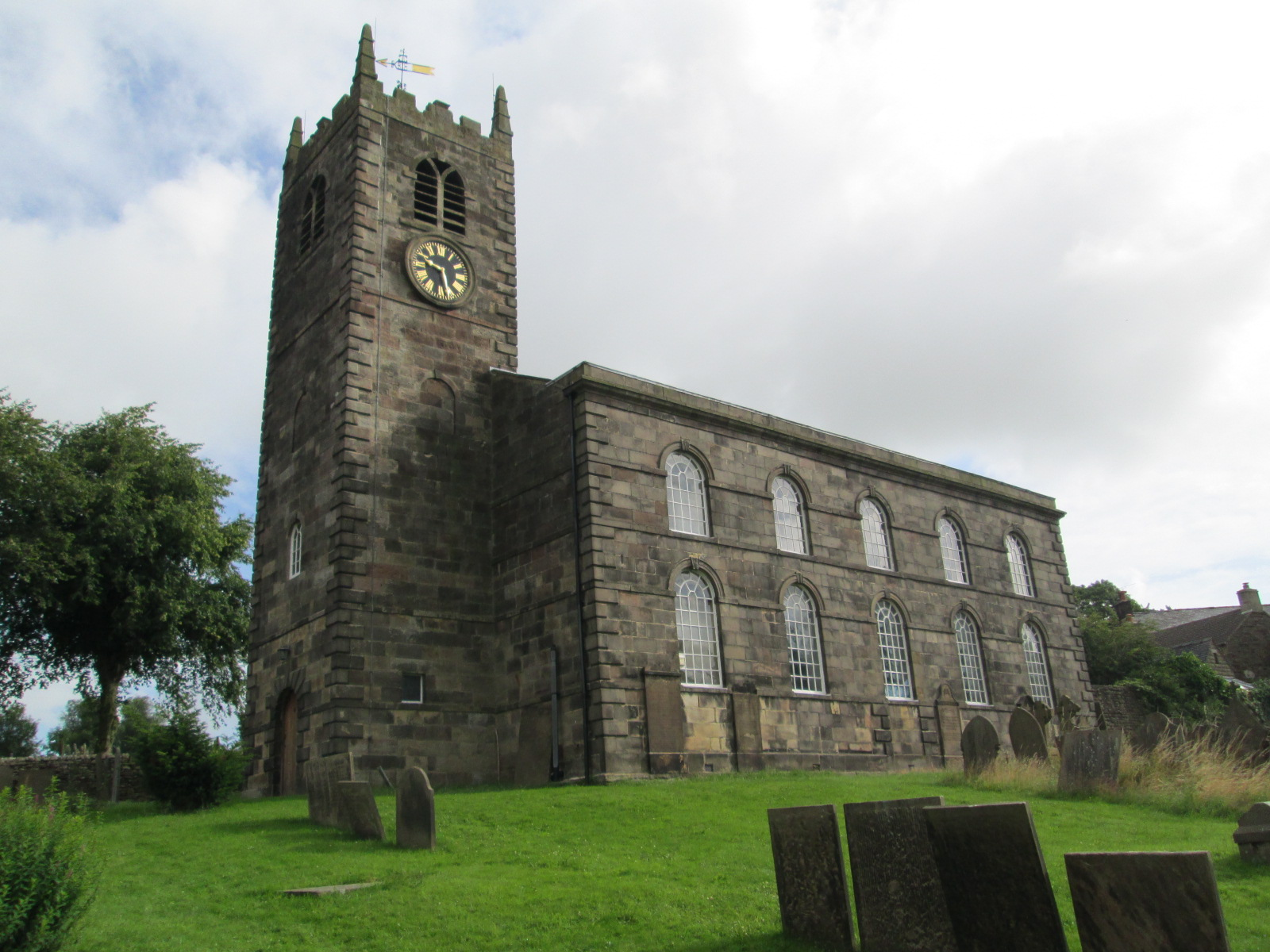
- Church of St Bartholomew, Longnor
- 53.1815°N 1.8675°W
- OS grid reference: SK 089 649
- Location: Longnor, Staffordshire
- Country: England
- Denomination: Church of England
- Website: longnorchurches.org.uk/longnor/

History
- Dedication: Saint Bartholomew

Architecture
- Heritage designation: Grade II*
- Designated: 1 February 1967
- Completed: c.1781; 245 years ago

Administration
- Diocese: Diocese of Lichfield
- Deanery: Alstonefield Deanery

The Church of St Bartholomew is a Grade II* listed Anglican church in the village of Longnor in north-east Staffordshire. It was built in the late 18th century.

== History ==
There was probably a church in Longnor in the 12th century, since the font in the present church is of that period; the earliest mention of a church here was in 1448. It is thought it stood in what is now the churchyard, which was formerly a large space used for markets and fairs.

The present church was built about 1781; the earlier building was demolished and the new church was built on a site to the north. It is of coursed ashlar; it has a rectangular nave, with no separate chancel, with five rounded-headed windows on each side; there is a west tower. In 1812 the walls were raised to allow a south gallery (which was later removed) and a west gallery; an upper arcade of windows, of similar shape to those below, was added. There is an external staircase leading to the west gallery. In 1852 an organ was installed in the south gallery, and later was placed on the south side of the chancel. In 1948–49 a false ceiling was installed, so the upper windows can be seen only from the outside.

The font, the only survival from an early church, was in the churchyard in 1830, when the archdeacon ordered that it be put inside the church. It is in the west end of the nave, under the gallery. It is chalice-shaped, carved from a single block of gritstone; there is incised decoration of a face and shields.

The gates at the western end of the churchyard, and two monuments within it, are separately listed at Grade II.

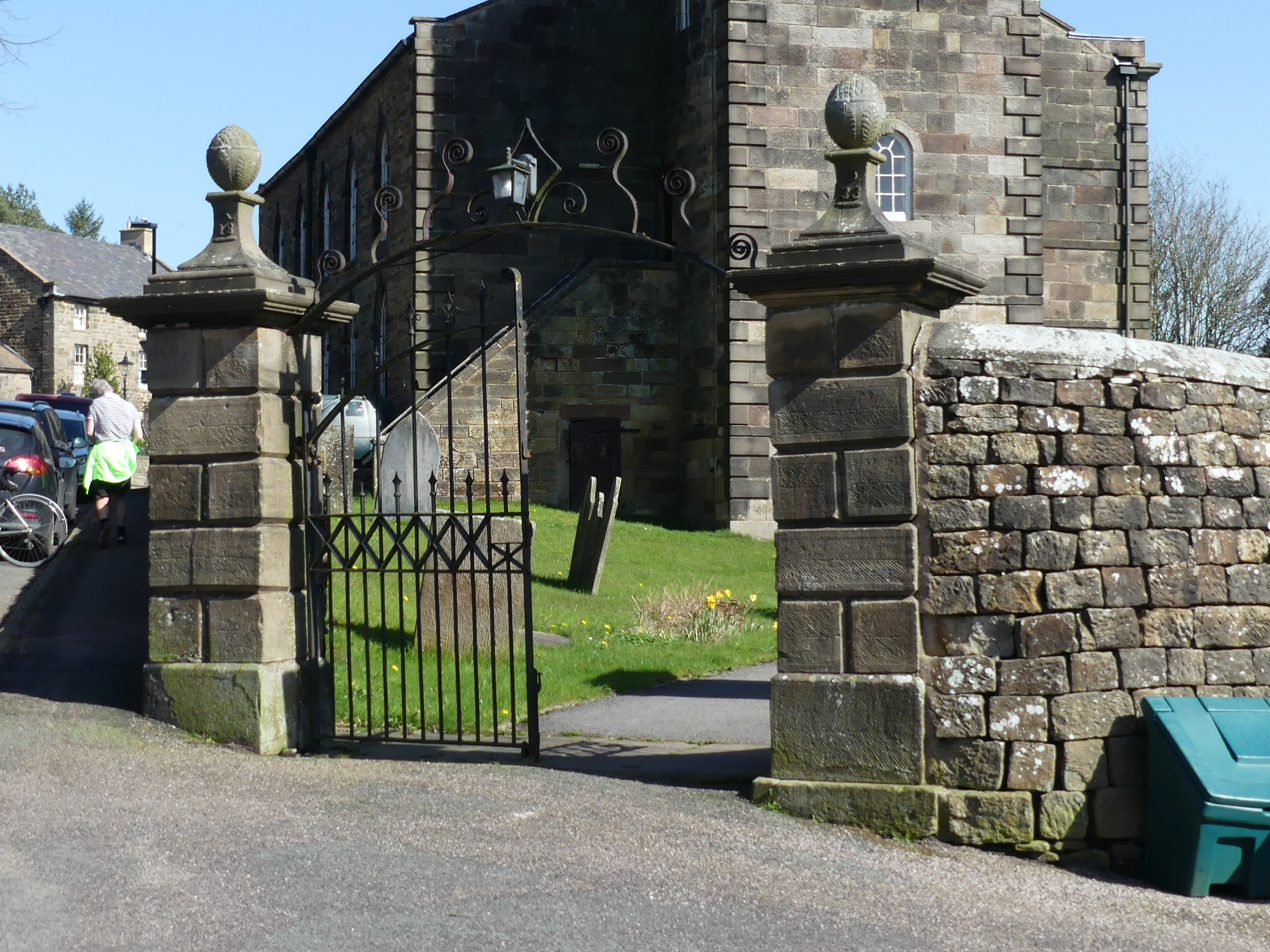
Church gates

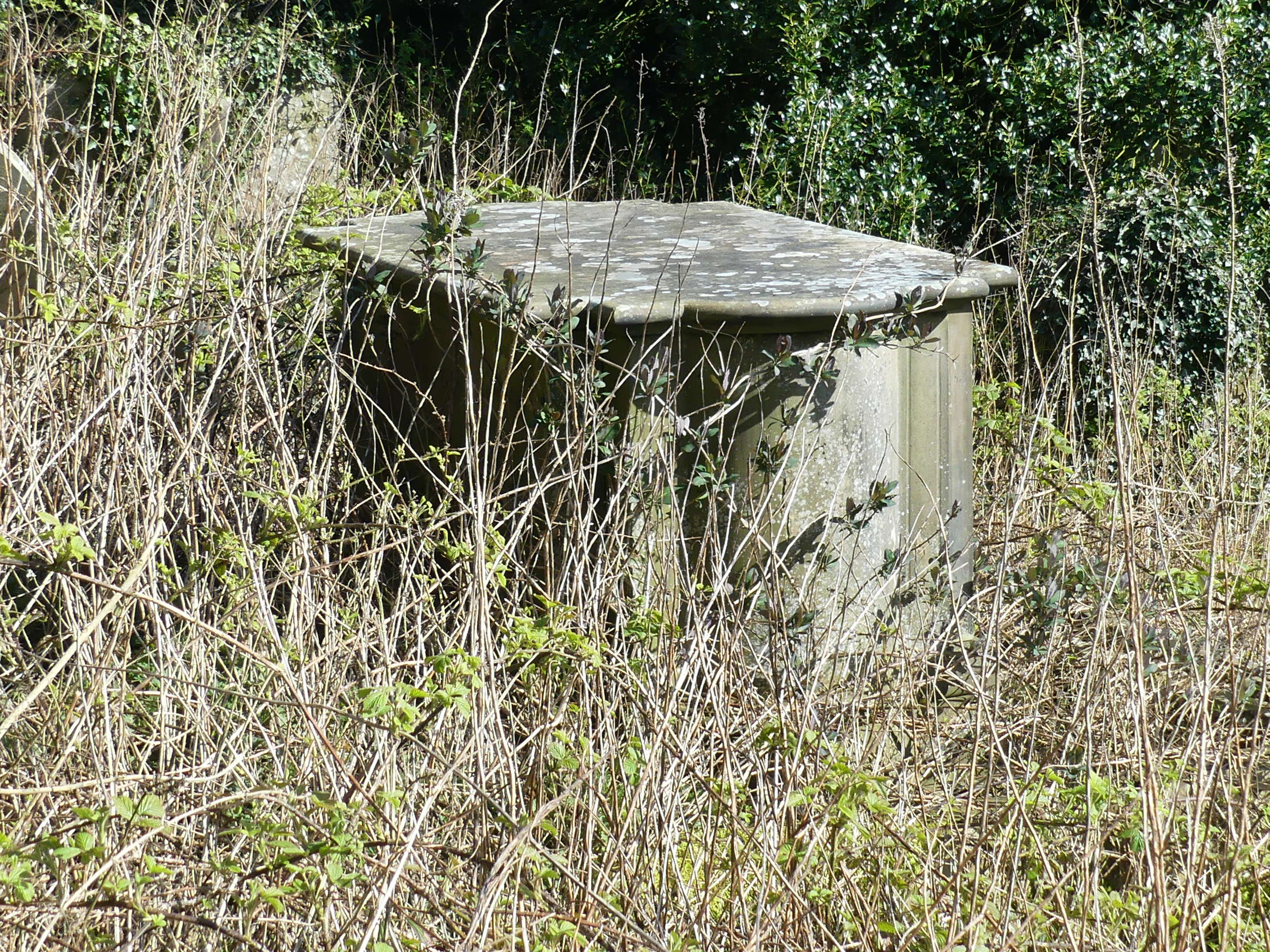
Basset memorial

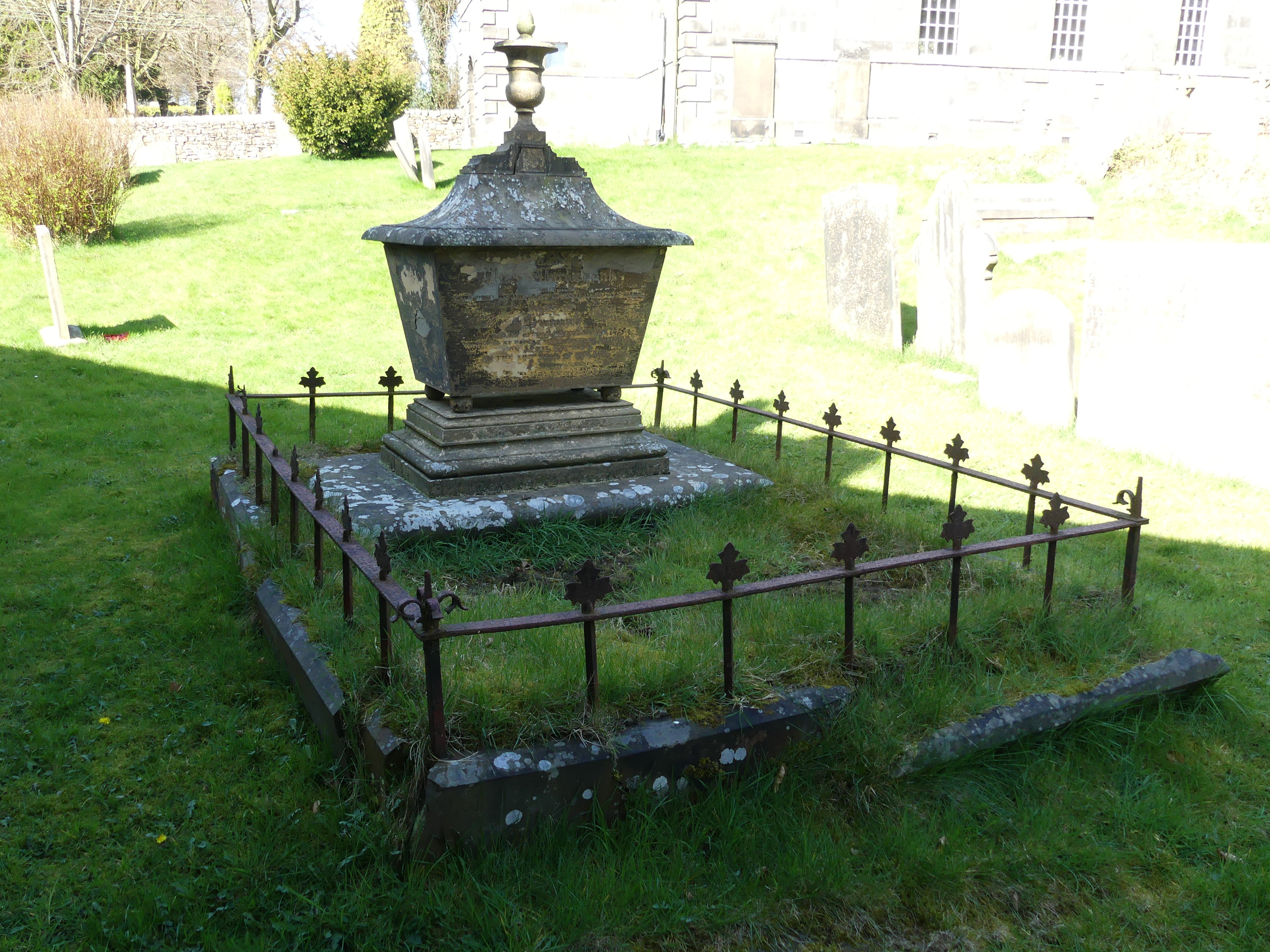
Charlesworth memorial

== See also ==
- Listed buildings in Longnor, Staffordshire
