= Longnor, Staffordshire =

Village in Staffordshire, England

Coordinates: 53.181°N 1.869°W

Longnor
- Village
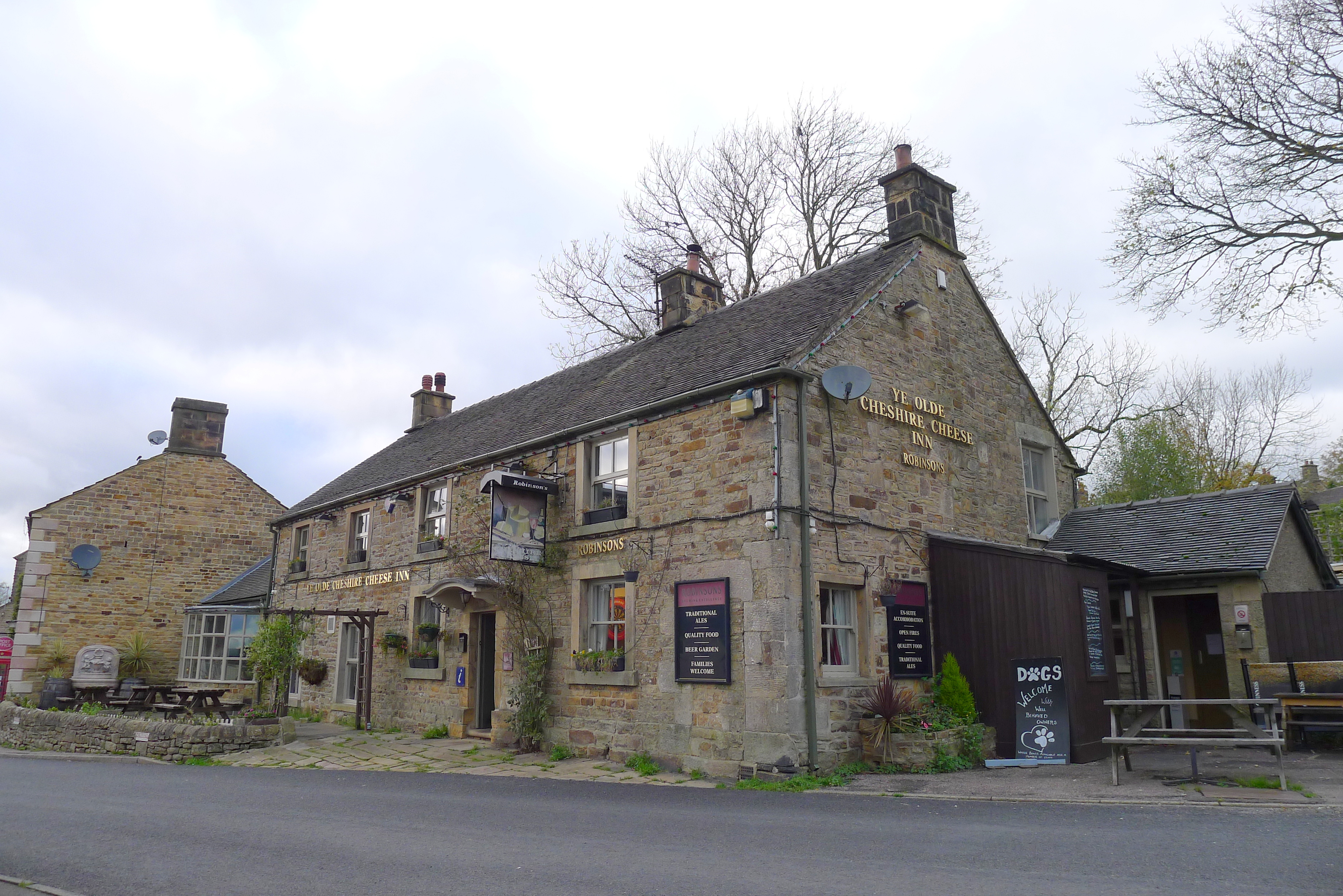
- Ye Olde Cheshire Cheese Inn

- Location within Staffordshire
- Population: 334 (2011)
- OS grid reference: SK090650
- Civil parish: Longnor
- District: Staffordshire Moorlands
- Shire county: Staffordshire
- Region: West Midlands
- Country: England
- Sovereign state: United Kingdom
- Post town: Buxton
- Postcode district: SK17
- Dialling code: 01298
- Police: Staffordshire
- Fire: Staffordshire
- Ambulance: West Midlands

Longnor is a village in the Staffordshire Peak District, England. The settlement dates from early times, the first recorded church building being in the Middle Ages. The village was named Longenalre in the Domesday Book. Located on a major crossroads, Longnor was a significant market town in the 18th century. It lies on the north bank of the River Manifold, on a limestone ridge between the Manifold and the River Dove.

== Location and geography ==
Longnor is about 6 miles (10 km) south of Buxton on the B5053 main road from Cheadle to Buxton. It is at a crossroads with routes to Leek and Macclesfield to the west and Bakewell to the east.

West of Longnor are the Staffordshire Moorlands, with a summit at Axe Edge Moor towards the north and Morridge further south. North and east of Longnor is the White Peak section of the Peak District, with the River Dove flowing in a steep-sided limestone valley of which the famous Dovedale is a small part.

Longnor looks towards the River Manifold but lies on the southern slope of a limestone ridge between the two rivers.

== Village description ==
Longnor is one of the more significant villages in this corner of north Staffordshire, chiefly for the market.

The parish of Longnor is one of 13 in the Deanery of Alstonefield, Lichfield Diocese.

== History ==
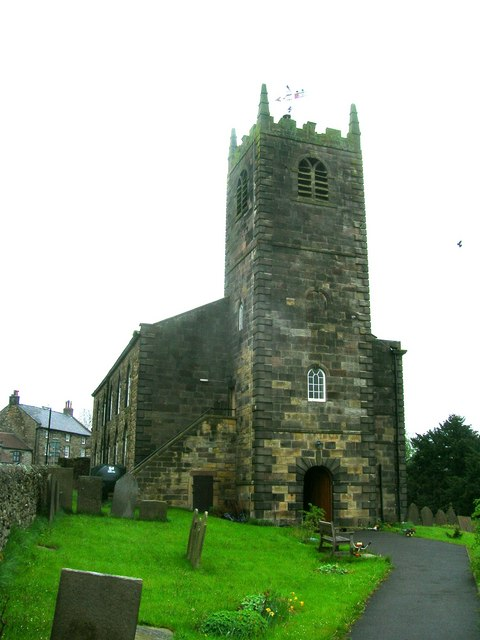
St Bartholomew's Church

Records of the village's early history have been lost, but there is evidence of activity in the area from around 700AD. Longnor is listed in the Great Domesday Book of 1086 as Longenalre. It is distinguished from the other modern Longnor near Shrewsbury which is in the Domesday Book as Lege. According to local legend the village was burned during the reign of William II as a punishment for the poaching of deer from the forests around Leek.

The first written record cites the founding of St Bartholomew's Church in 1223 on the site of the present 18th century parish church, and over the next two centuries there were around 20 homes in the village.

The 1787 Cary map of Staffordshire shows the village on a major crossroads. Cary wrote the name in all capitals, a style shared only with Leek and Cheadle in Staffordshire north of Stafford and The Potteries. This implies that Longnor was then a market town of some significance.

The village formed the basis of two paintings by L. S. Lowry, Longnor, Derbyshire (1940) and A Village Square (1943; now in Glasgow). He wrote of the latter work:

I remember doing it quite well. It was based on a much earlier painting of mine of Longnor, a village in Derbyshire [sic] which I did about 40–45 years ago at least.

=== Methodist history ===
Built in 1780, the Methodist Chapel is one of the oldest in the area. John Wesley once preached at Longnor while passing through on a journey from Sheffield. However Methodist preachers had established a Methodist society before this in 1769. The fuller story of early Methodism in Longnor is told by J. B. Dyson, along with a brief biography of Mrs Cecily Ferguson who later was hostess to John Wesley on his visit to Amsterdam. In 1784, Longnor Methodist Society had 42 members.

In 1870, a new Methodist Circuit was created, which was named the "Wetton and Longnor Methodist Circuit". The manse was built at Wetton, along with a new chapel building. But the importance of Longnor was also recognised. The original Wetton and Longnor Circuit had been Wesleyan, and in 1932 it took in some of the Primitive Methodist chapels in the area. In 1969 the circuit was closed and its chapels assigned to neighbouring circuits. The Methodist Chapel closed in the 1996, but some of the former members continued to meet for a while in a hired hall, because the journey to Buxton Methodist Church was not practical.

== Points of general interest ==
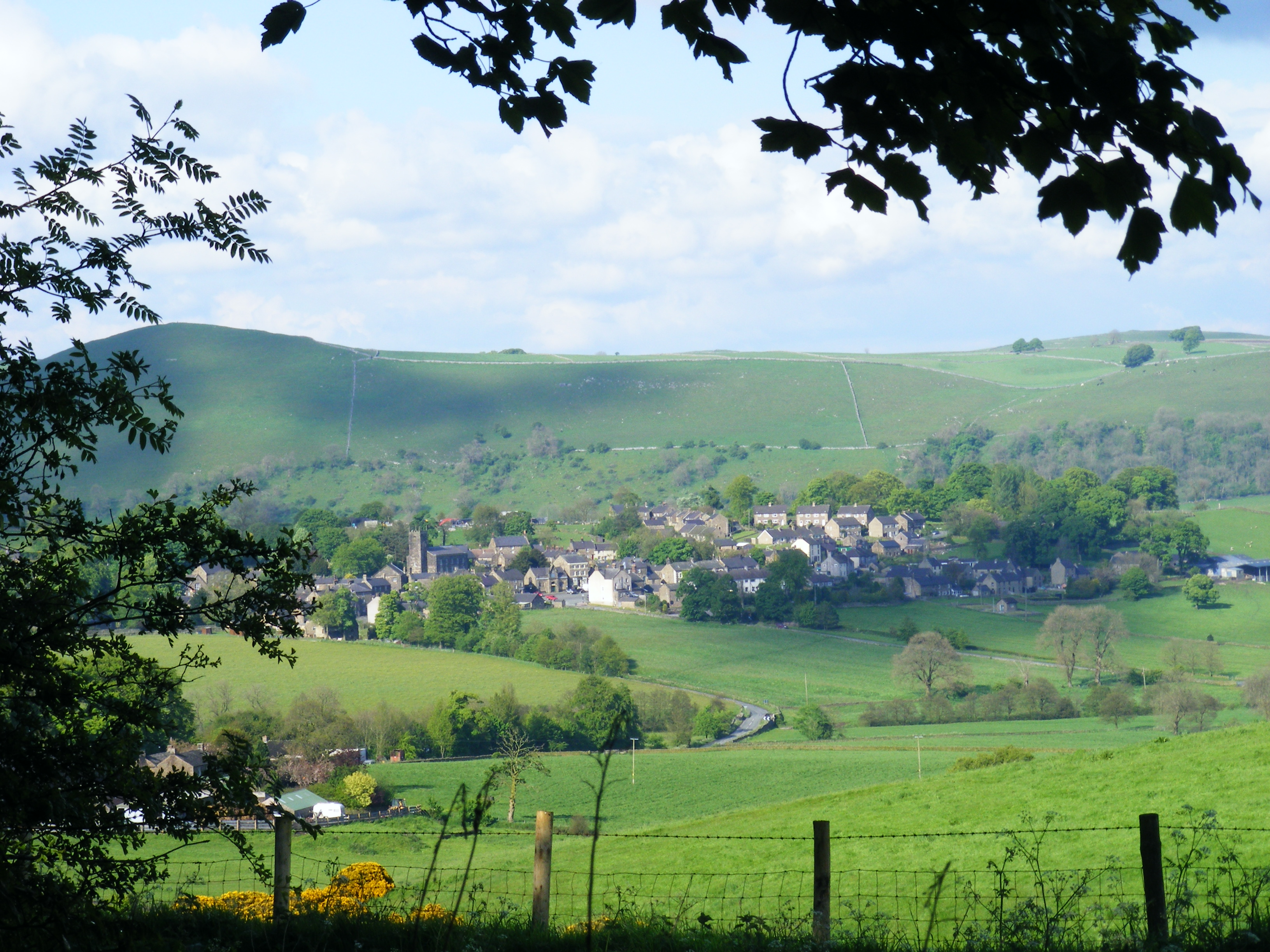
Longnor village from the south-west

Some of the TV series Peak Practice was filmed here.

In episode 5 of the BBC's 1995 adaptation of Pride and Prejudice, Longnor was used for shots of the fictitious village of Lambton, where Elizabeth Bennet and her aunt and uncle stay during their visit to Derbyshire.

The church of St Bartholomew, Longnor, has a modern sculpture of St Bertram by British Frink School sculptor Harry Everington.

The nearby Blakemere Pond is a body of water precariously perched upon a hilltop, with scenic views across the Peak District and beyond in two directions.

== See also ==
- Listed buildings in Longnor, Staffordshire
