= Church of St Luke, Sheen, Staffordshire =

Coordinates: 53.1505°N 1.8321°W

Church of St Luke, Sheen
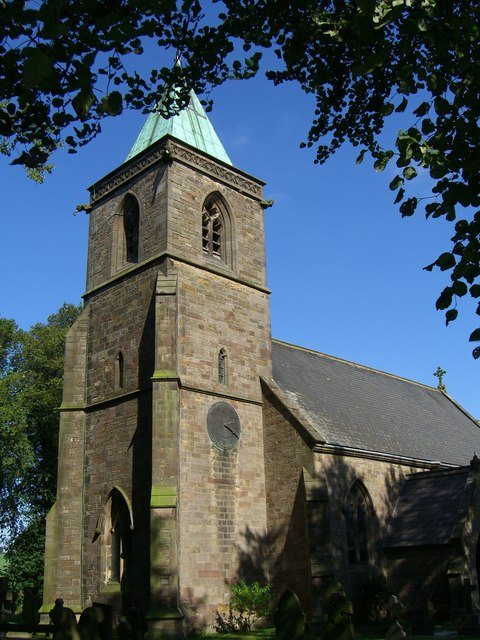
- "Pevsner's last building"

- Location in Staffordshire
- OS grid reference: SK113615
- Location: Sheen, Staffordshire
- Country: England
- Denomination: Church of England

History
- Dedication: Saint Luke

Architecture
- Heritage designation: Grade II*
- Designated: 1 February 1967
- Architect: William Butterfield
- Completed: C14th, with C19th reconstruction

Administration
- Diocese: Diocese of Lichfield
- Deanery: Alstonfield Deanery

The Church of St Luke, Sheen, Staffordshire is a Grade II* listed Anglican church. Its origins are of the 14th century, but it was largely rebuilt in the mid-19th century, firstly by C. W. Burleigh, and then by William Butterfield. The church, and its associated parsonage, were the last buildings recorded by Nikolaus Pevsner in his Buildings of England series, when he concluded the series in 1974 with his Staffordshire volume, finishing a project begun in 1945.

== History ==
The church was founded in the 14th century. Reconstruction began in 1850, under the supervision of a local architect, C. W. Burleigh of Leeds. Burleigh was soon replaced by William Butterfield, due to the intervention of the patron of the living, A. J. B. Beresford Hope.

Beresford Hope was interested in reorganising the parish in line with the Tractarian movement; in 1851 he presented his friend Benjamin Webb to the perpetual curacy of Sheen. Webb had been reluctant to accept the living because of the remoteness of the area, and resigned in 1862; he was replaced by T. E. Heygate, the assistant curate since 1851.

=== Pevsner's visit ===
"Would even the most enthusiastic Victorian fan choose to live in this house with the same unhesitating delight with which the young of a generation before would have moved into a Georgian house of the same size?"

— Pevsner on Butterfield's parsonage at Sheen.

On the morning of Tuesday 6 October 1970, Pevsner arrived at the church in the company of the journalist Geoffrey Moorhouse. Pevsner had begun work on the Buildings of England series in 1945, with the first volume, Cornwall, being published in 1951. By the time he arrived in Sheen, to complete the work with the volume covering Staffordshire, 45 volumes had been written. Moorhouse recorded the visit to Sheen in an article in The Observer, published on 10 October 1970, and entitled "Pevsner's Last Building". Pevsner recorded his own impressions of Butterfield's parsonage, and of Victorian architecture more generally, in the conclusion of his entry for Sheen. (See box).

The church remains an active parish church in the Diocese of Lichfield.

== Architecture and description ==
The church is of coursed stone, with a tower, nave, chancel, vestry and porch. The tower has a pyramidal roof. The style of the whole is Pointed Gothic. The church is a Grade II* listed building. The parsonage is also Grade II* listed, and Pevsner describes it as "personal and forceful". At the time of their visit, Moorhouse noted that the parsonage was "abandoned and mostly boarded up". It has since been restored.

== See also ==
- Grade II* listed buildings in Staffordshire Moorlands
- Listed buildings in Sheen, Staffordshire
