= Listed buildings in Heathylee =

Heathylee is a civil parish in the district of Staffordshire Moorlands, Staffordshire, England. It contains eleven listed buildings that are recorded in the National Heritage List for England. All the listed buildings are designated at Grade II, the lowest of the three grades, which is applied to "buildings of national importance and special interest". The parish contains the village of Upper Hulme, and is otherwise rural. The listed buildings consist of a house and farmhouses, a former sawmill, a public house, and five mileposts, four of them along the A54 road.

== Buildings ==
Name and location	Photograph	Date	Notes
Naychurch Farmhouse; 53.15162°N 1.97818°W	—	17th century	The farmhouse was altered and extended in the 20th century. It is in stone with a stone slate roof, two storeys and two bays. On the front is a lean-to porch and a blocked Tudor arched door-head to the left. The south gable end contains paired blocked three-light windows with chamfered mullions.
Brook Cottages; 53.14620°N 1.98261°W	—	Mid 18th century	The house is in stone, and has a blue tile roof with verge parapets. There are two storeys, two bays, and a single-storey wing to the right. The windows are two-light casements with mullions.
Broncott Farmhouse; 53.14508°N 1.98176°W	—	Early 19th century	A stone farmhouse with a blue tile roof and verge parapets. There are two storeys and three bays. The central doorway has a fanlight and a corbelled hood, and the windows are sashes.
Longnor Sawmill; 53.17903°N 1.87475°W		Early 19th century	The sawmill is in stone with quoins and a blue tile roof. There are three storeys, a main range of six bays, and projections on the left and in the centre. The entrances and windows have round-arched heads with keystones. Inside is a cast iron overshot waterwheel, and there is a vaulted mill race return.
The Knowles Farmhouse; 53.14858°N 1.97494°W	—	Early 19th century	The farmhouse is in stone, and has a blue tile roof with verge parapets. There are three storeys and a T-shaped plan, with a three-bay front range and a rear wing. The central doorway has a moulded surround and a cornice, and the windows are mullioned casements.
The Rock Inn; 53.14601°N 1.9816°W		Early 19th century	A private house, later a public house, it is in stone with chamfered quoins, string courses, a moulded eaves band, and a stone slate roof with verge parapets on shaped kneelers. There are two storeys and an attic, three bays, a one-bay extension to the left, and later extensions to the right and at the rear. The doorway has a moulded surround, a fanlight, paterae, a fluted frieze, and a cornice. Attached to the door are elaborate scrolled wrought iron projecting brackets. The windows are small-pane top-hung casements with shaped chamfered voussoirs and keystones.
Milepost near Upper Hulme; 53.14329°N 1.98206°W		Early 19th century	The milepost is on the southeast side of the A54 road. It is in cast iron, and consists of a circular shaft and enlarged head with a domed top. On the head are the distances to Leek and Buxton.
Milepost 4 miles from Leek; 53.15536°N 1.97207°W	—	Late 19th century	The milepost is on the east side of the A54 road. It is in cast iron, about 700 millimetres (28 in) high, and consists of a circular shaft and enlarged head with a domed top. On the head are the distances to Leek and Buxton.
Milepost 5 miles from Leek; 53.16963°N 1.96342°W		Late 19th century	The milepost is on the east side of the A54 road. It is in cast iron, about 700 millimetres (28 in) high, and consists of a circular shaft and enlarged head with a domed top. On the head are the distances to Leek and Buxton.
Milepost 6 miles from Leek; 53.18335°N 1.95451°W		Late 19th century	The milepost is on the east side of the A54 road. It is in cast iron, about 500 millimetres (20 in) high, and consists of a circular shaft and enlarged head with a domed top. On the head are the distances to Leek and Buxton.
Milepost near Longnor; 53.17683°N 1.87002°W		Early 20th century	The milepost is on the west side of the B5053 road. It is in cast iron and has a triangular plan and a sloping top. On the top is "HEATHYLEE" and on the sides are the distances to Warslow, Longnor, Buxton, Ipstones, Froghall, and Cheadle.
