= Cambridge Camden Society =

Learned architectural society founded in 1839

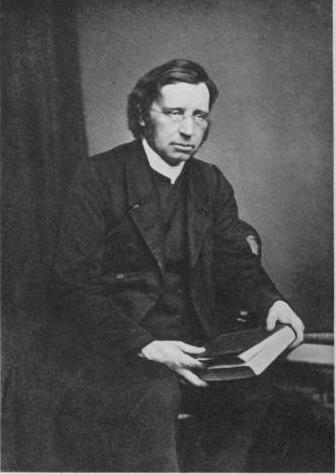
John Mason Neale, one of the founders of the society

The Cambridge Camden Society, known from 1845 (when it moved to London) as the Ecclesiological Society, was a learned society founded in 1839 to promote "the study of Gothic Architecture, and of Ecclesiastical Antiques". Its activities came to include publishing a monthly journal, The Ecclesiologist, advising church builders on their blueprints, and advocating a return to a medieval style of church architecture in England, known as Gothic Revival architecture. At its peak influence in the 1840s, the society had over 700 members, including bishops of the Church of England, deans at the University of Cambridge, and Members of Parliament. The society and its publications enjoyed wide influence over the design of English churches throughout the 19th century, and are often known as the ecclesiological movement.

During its 20-year lifespan, the Cambridge Camden Society and its journal influenced virtually every aspect of the Anglican Church and almost single-handedly reinvented the architectural design of the parish church. The group was responsible for launching some of the first earnest investigations of medieval church design and through its publications invented and shaped the "science" of ecclesiology, the theological study of the Christian church. Throughout its lifetime, all of the Society's actions had one goal: to return the Church as a whole, and the individual church buildings of England, to the religious splendour of the Middle Ages. As well as aesthetic arguments, a number of theological arguments for the unique appropriateness of the Gothic to church buildings were promoted. The Cambridge Camden Society held tremendous influence in the architectural and ecclesiastical worlds because of the success of this argument: that the corruption and ugliness of the 19th century could be escaped by the earnest attempt to recapture the piety and beauty of the Middle Ages.

The society was founded by undergraduate students at the University of Cambridge, and took its original name from that place and from the 16th-century antiquary and historian William Camden. It fell into abeyance soon after 1868, but was re-established in 1879 as the St Paul's Ecclesiological Society, before reverting to the name the Ecclesiological Society in 1937. Under that name it still exists, with its focus now on church history and historic church architecture.

== Sources and inspiration ==
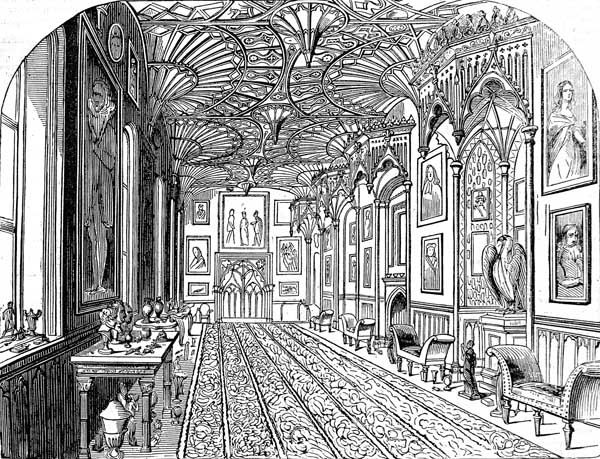
The gallery at Strawberry Hill, showing Gothic revival architecture

The society's "ecclesiology" was an idea about both architecture and worship, inspired by the associationism of the Gothic Revival and reform movements within the Anglican Church. Beginning as far back as Horace Walpole's Strawberry Hill, Gothic architecture was used to associate a building with certain attractive aspects of the Middle Ages. For the early revivalists, this attractiveness was the picturesque quality of the architecture. However, the Middle Ages had always had a strong association with religious piety. The Anglican Church of the early 19th century was a languishing body, filled with corruption among the clergy and a lack of respect among the parishioners.

When, in 1833 John Henry Newman began the Oxford Movement, or Tractarianism, a renewal of theology, ecclesiology, sacraments, and liturgical practices within the Anglican Church, all of the pieces were in place for the inception of the Cambridge Camden Society. Its founders, John Mason Neale, Alexander Hope, and Benjamin Webb, formed the society with the belief that by using Church reform in conjunction with piety of Gothic architecture, England could recapture the religious perfection of the Middle Ages. Their idealism is clear in one of the society's early letters: "We know that [medieval] Catholick ethics gave rise to Catholick architecture; may we not hope that, by a kind of reversed process, association with Catholick architecture will give rise to Catholick ethics?" The Ecclesiologists earnestly believed that medieval men were "more spiritually-minded and less worldly-minded" than were those of the modern world and that it was their duty to help return England to its former piety.

== Beginnings ==
The Cambridge Camden Society began in May 1839 as a club for University of Cambridge undergraduates who shared a common interest in Gothic church design. Its first activities were the collection of information about churches across the island. The amount of knowledge obtained from travellers' visits to and careful measurements of long-forgotten parish churches was immense and led to the publication of A Few Hints on the Practical Study of Ecclesiological Antiquities. This handbook contained "A Blank form for the Description of a Church", which was a checklist of medieval architectural elements one could use to examine a church. This checklist was not only a useful tool for the investigator, but served as a database of knowledge for the society, and was constantly updated with more detailed information sent from country churches. Thus the Cambridge Camden Society amassed an enormous amount of information about medieval parish churches and came to be seen as an authority on religious architecture. Nor was this attribution misplaced. The society's vigour in examining and defining every detail of the medieval church was enormous, so much so that its magazine, the Ecclesiologist published both heated debates about the usage of small slits dubbed "lychnoscopes" that were observed in some churches and an invention called an "Orientator" that allowed one to determine whether or not a church faced exactly East. The motive for these extraordinarily scrutinising investigations was the society's unshakeable belief that man could regain the piety of the Middle Ages by carefully reconstructing them.

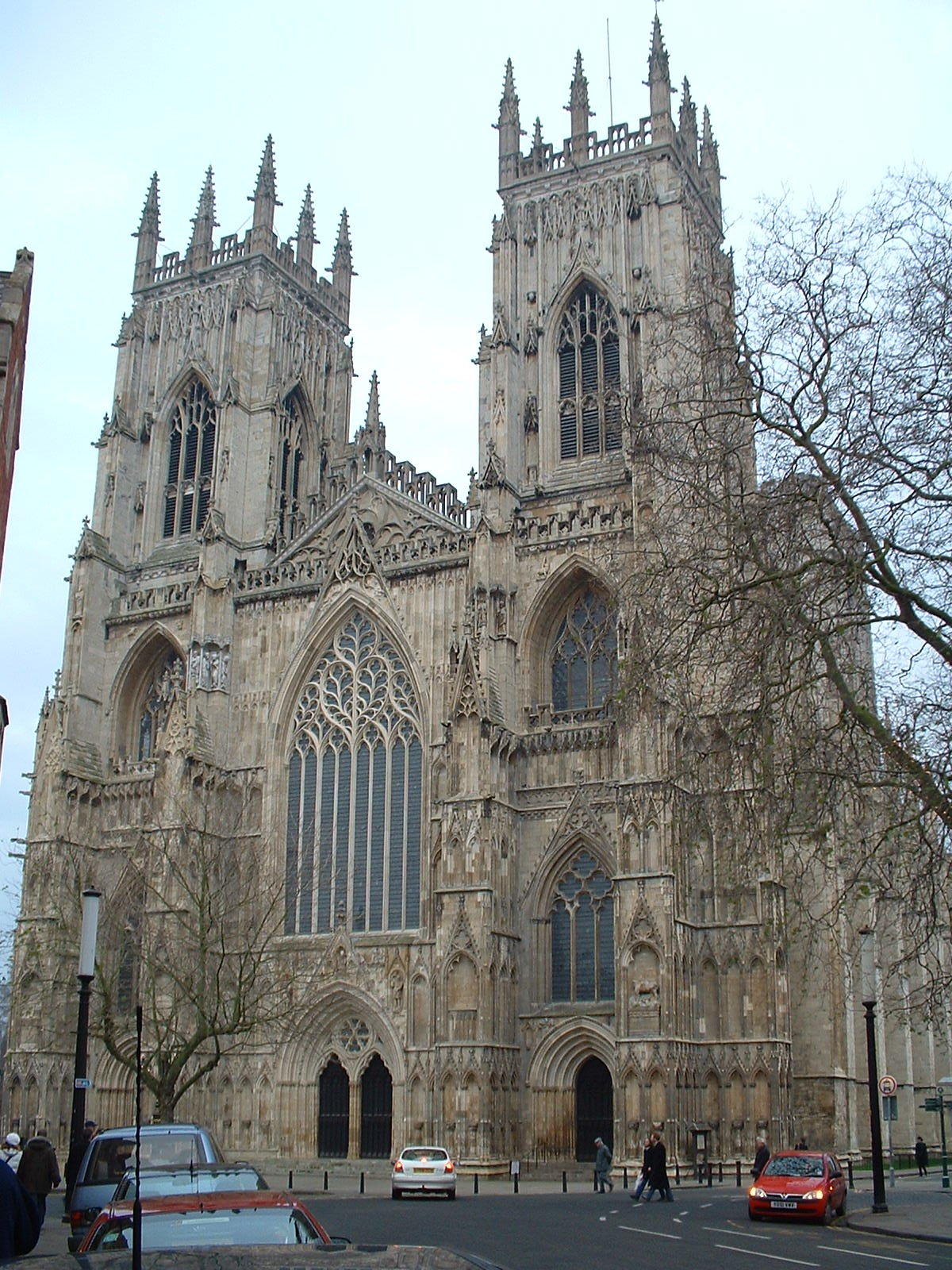
The west front of York Minster, an example of Decorated Gothic architecture

== A Few Words to Church-builders ==
In 1841 the society published a pamphlet entitled A Few Words to Church-builders, summarising its ideas about what a modern church should be. It consisted of 32 pages with an appendix of 22 pages. In the first edition they recommended the early English style for small chapels and the decorated or perpendicular for larger ones, but by the third edition of 1844 (29 pages only) they were unreservedly recommending the Decorated style. The two essential parts of a church were a nave, and a well-defined chancel not less than a third of the length of the nave. Aisles were recommended, because a tripartite church symbolised the Holy Trinity, but a single aisle was acceptable, if that was all funds permitted. A tower could be in any position, except over the altar, but was not essential. Stone should be used, not brick, flint being perfectly acceptable. The chancel to be was strictly for the clergy, and no laity should enter. It should be raised at least two steps above the nave, and the altar should also be raised. Chancel and nave should be separated by a roodscreen, "that most beautiful and Catholick appendage to a church". This was a radical recommendation–the pamphlet points out that not one modern church had such a screen. The author also had a liking for sedilia and aumbries. The font must be in the nave and near a door. Seating should not be in closed pews, but open benches or chairs, and galleries were inadmissible.

== The Ecclesiologist ==
The popularity of the Cambridge Camden Society's handbook soon led some churchwardens to seek advice on how to restore their dilapidated buildings. These solicitations were enthusiastically answered and the Cambridge Camden Society's mission changed from mere antiquarianism to architectural consultation. The society's advice soon found a forum in The Ecclesiologist, the Cambridge Camden Society's newsletter, the first issue of which was first published in October 1841. The publication began as "a periodical report of the society, primarily addressed to, and intended for the use of, the members of that body". Because of the authority the society wielded in architectural matters, however, it soon published architectural criticism. The newsletter reviewed over one thousand churches in its twenty-year span and never hesitated to lambast both a building and its architect for anything inconsistent with its view of the "middle pointed" (i.e. Decorated).

As often as not, the Society's verdict on an architect's work was determined as much by his personal life as his building design. Although A. W. N. Pugin was by any standard a pioneer of the Gothic revival and had aesthetic tastes very close to those of the Cambridge Camden Society, he was unequivocally condemned for his Roman Catholicism. Likewise, the publication says of Thomas Rickman, a Quaker, "many have really felt it a stumbling-block that a person of Mr. Rickman's religious persuasion should be regarded as a benefactor to Christian Art" and "he did very little … and his churches are monuments of extreme ecclesiological ignorance." Although many architects drew the ire of The Ecclesiologist, the editors did not hesitate to lavish praise on those select few whom they deemed worthy. Henry C. Carpenter's Church of St Paul, Bristol was widely praised for its correctness, as was S. W. Daukes' Church of St Andrew, Wells Street, London. The highest praise of all was given, in July 1842, to John Hayward for St Andrew's Church, Exwick, Devon; this was proudly pronounced "the best specimen of modern church we have yet seen".

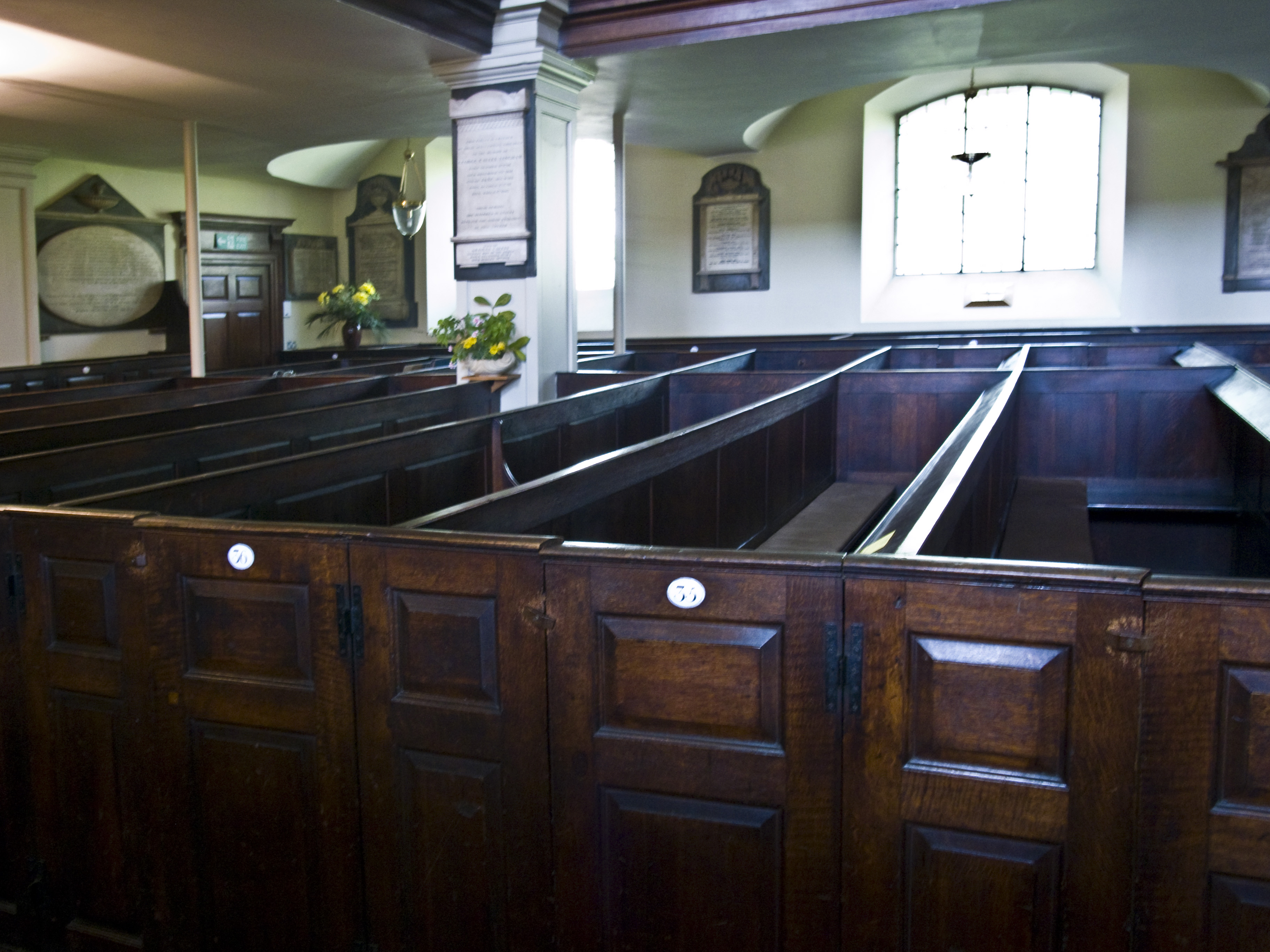
Box pews of the type condemned by the society in St Paul's Church, Birmingham

The Society's favourite, however, was undoubtedly William Butterfield. The architect was a man of tremendous religious conviction who refused to build for Roman Catholics. Despite his frequent infringements of the rules set out by The Ecclesiologist, Butterfield retained a special status with the Society which culminated in its high praise of All Saints, Margaret Street, around the corner from Wells Street. Despite numerous violations of its principles, such as his use of brick, expressly forbidden by The Ecclesiologist, the Society went so far as to bankroll Butterfield's church. Although the Cambridge Camden Society claimed to be solely concerned with architecture, its criticism and praise of designers was often based as much on their personal convictions as it was on Gothic correctness.

The Ecclesiologist was also the vehicle by which the Cambridge Camden Society launched its two most important campaigns, the abolition of pews and the reintroduction of chancels to churches. The society received much sympathy in its call to rid churches of purchased pews, perhaps in part due to its fiery rhetoric: "What is the history of pues, but the history of the intrusion of human pride, selfishness, and indolence, into the worship of God?" At first, the society had a hard time convincing builders to incorporate chancel areas because, since Anglican clergy were no longer separated from the congregation by an altar, there was no real purpose for the expensive addition. The problem was solved, however, when Walter Hook and John Jebb, clergymen at Leeds and Hereford, respectively, proposed that chancels be used for lay choirs. Soon almost all old churches were dismantling their pews, and new churches were being built with chancels. Both issues were major successes and seen as significant steps in the Cambridge Camden Society's quest to "medievalise" the English Church.

== Piety and theology ==
Members of the society also published books such as the Hierugia Anglicana, which sought to prove that medieval Catholic ritual had lived on in the Anglican Church past the Reformation and was therefore a proper way to offer worship. Another important work was The Symbolism of Churches and Church Ornaments, also known by the name of the medieval author who inspired it, Durandus. In this book, Neale and Webb sought to prove that absolutely every architectural element of the medieval church building was religiously symbolic and represented Christian piety and thought well above that of the 19th century. The work also proclaimed that church architects must "take a religious view of their profession" and that "we do protest against the merely business-like spirit of the modern profession, and demand from them a more elevated and directly religious habit of mind". Although nominally scholarly, these persuasive works were quite obviously intended to further the society's own philosophical and theological viewpoints.

The theological doctrines espoused by the Cambridge Camden Society were never gentle and the society had many critics, both religious and architectural. Members of the Anglican Church detested the "popish" and "romanising" tendencies they saw in the Ecclesiologist's judgements while Catholics such as Pugin resented the idea that the Roman Church had lost its piety and vigour. Because the Society's doctrines were so closely related to the Oxford Movement and Cambridge Movement, it also drew heavy criticism from the anti-Tractarianists. The Cambridge Camden Society had a clever smokescreen to avoid addressing such attacks, however. Its bylaws forbad theological debate, insisting that the Society was solely architectural in its mission. Thus although its leaders put forth a definite theological position, they could never be charged with direct meddling in Church matters. This defence worked most of the time, but it did not lessen the hatred many had for the Society's disguised theological agenda. Likewise, many architects despised the Society for its intolerance of creative freedom. Self-righteous outbursts like the Ecclesiologist's assertion that "it is no sign of weakness to be content to copy acknowledged perfection: it is rather a sign of presumption to expect to rival it in any other way" did little to win over its architectural enemies. Despite this, the Cambridge Camden Society and its Ecclesiologists never really lost a battle with its critics, aside from its forced removal from Cambridge to London in 1845 after an attack by anti-tractarianists. The society had so successfully won over the architectural community that when it disbanded in 1868, most felt that it had done everything it had set out to accomplish.

== Results ==
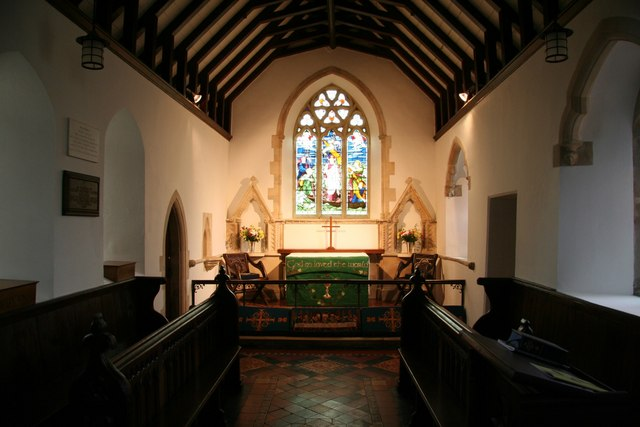
A typical restored chancel in a small parish church – St Mary's Church, Mortehoe

In the end, the Cambridge Camden Society's accomplishments were so pervasive that they have often been taken for granted. Historian James F. White states that "even buildings built in contemporary styles, with few exceptions, use the liturgical arrangement developed over a century ago by the Cambridge Camden Society. Here, many have felt, is the 'correct' way of building churches, and thousands of parishes all over have adapted their worship to fit this variety of building." Pews bought by money have vanished entirely thanks to the Society's campaign and chancels have been a normal feature in Neo-Medieval churches since the 1860s.

Although the Society did not win the Anglican Church over so wholly with its arguments promoting medieval ritual, it did help to draw attention to injustices committed in the Church and initiated much-needed reform. Even the music of the Church was affected by the Cambridge Camden Society. Under the auspices of the society, John Neale published the Hymnal Noted, a collection of more than one hundred hymns, among which was Neale's "O come, O come, Emmanuel", which he translated from 12th-century Latin.

Although a society of undergraduate students could hardly be expected to change the very nature of church building and worship across the world, the Cambridge Camden Society came very near to doing so. Incubated in Architectural Associationism, Romantic notions of the Middle Ages, and the Oxford reform movement, the Society sought to return England to its medieval past, and in its quest helped to rediscover the beauty of Gothic architecture and to rejuvenate the Anglican Church.

The last issue of The Ecclesiologist in 1868 was able to claim, with some truth, that "we have the satisfaction of retiring from the field victors".

== Publications of the Society ==
- The Ecclesiologist (1841–1869)
- A Few Words to Churchwardens on Churches and Church Ornamentation (1842)
- A Few Words to Church-builders
- Twenty-three Reasons for Getting Rid of Church Pues

== Sources ==
- White, James F., The Cambridge Movement. Cambridge: Cambridge University Press, 1962.
- Fontaney, Pierre (ed.), Le Renouveau Gothique en Angleterre. Bordeaux: Presses Universitaires de Bordeaux, 1989.
