= Blakemere Pond =

Lake in Staffordshire, England

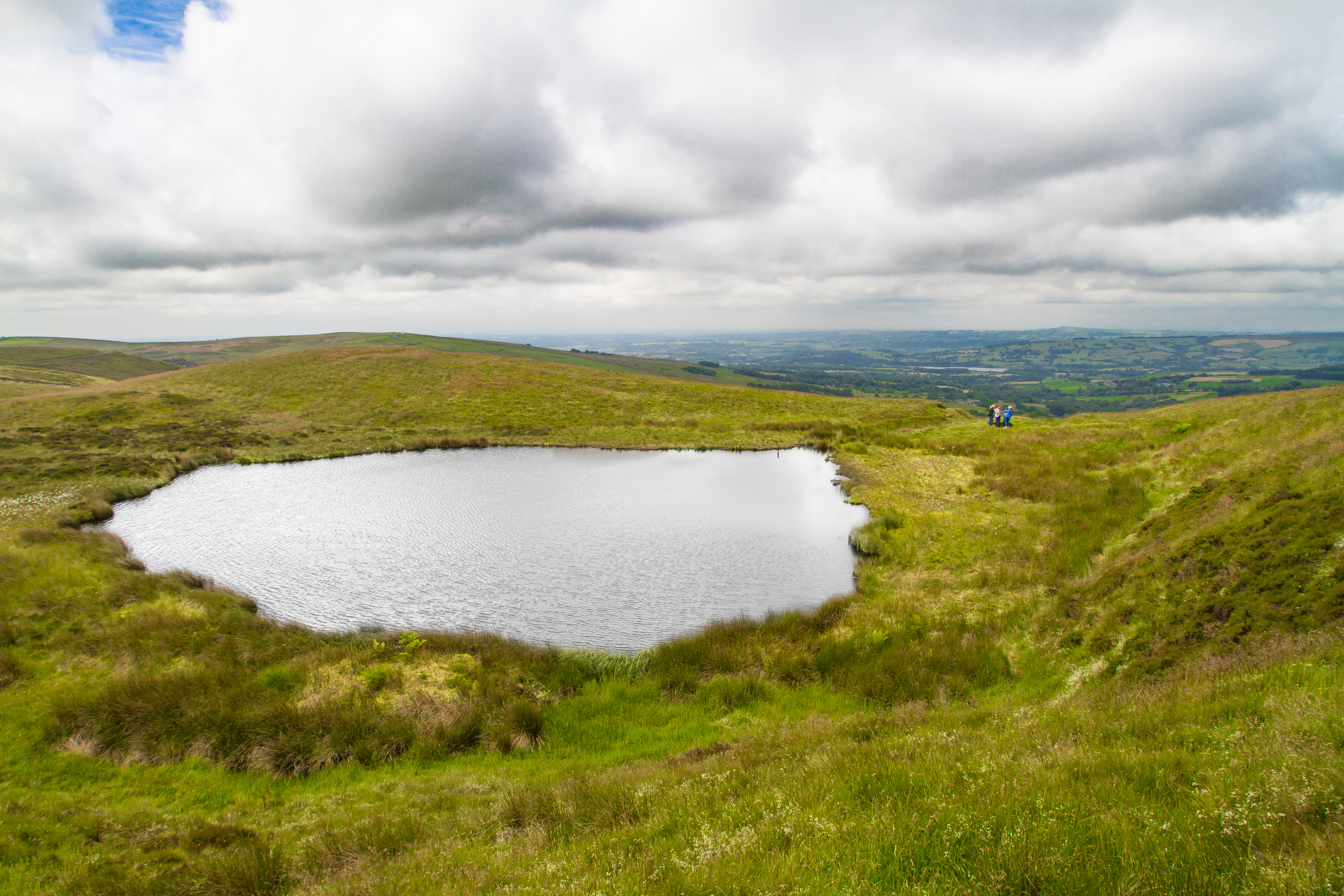
- Blakemere Pond

- Location within Staffordshire
- Location: Peak District
- Coordinates: 53°08′54″N 1°56′30″W
- Basin countries: United Kingdom

Blakemere Pond, also known as Black Mere Pool or Mermaid's Pond, is a small, natural lake in Staffordshire, England, six miles north-east of Leek. The pond is the subject of an enduring legend that claims that the water is haunted by the ghost of a mermaid.

== History ==
The earliest known record of the lake is from 1686, when Robert Plot wrote about it in his book The Natural History of Staffordshire. According to this text, the pond used to be much larger than its current diameter of 50 yards (46 m). There is some evidence of an artificial trench dug towards its eastern shore which could be the remnants of an attempt to lower the water level.

Over the centuries the pond has been the scene of a number of drownings and a murder when, in 1679, a woman pedlar was reportedly dumped in the pool by a local serial killer.

== Legend of the mermaid ==
The local legend of Blakemere Pond tells of a beautiful young woman who rejected the advances of a local man named Joshua Linnet. Unable to accept the rejection, Joshua accused the woman of being a witch and he managed to convince the local townsfolk to drown her in Blakemere Pond. With her final breath, however, the young woman is told to have muttered a curse against Joshua and three days later his body was found by the pool, his face covered with claw marks.

The last recorded sighting of the mermaid was in the mid-19th century when a group of locals attempted to drain the lake to see if the pool was indeed bottomless as claimed. Shortly after they began digging at the southern end of the pool (where a drainage ditch can still be seen to this day), it is said that the mermaid appeared from the lake and threatened to flood the nearby towns of Leek and Leekfrith unless they ceased their activities immediately. The source of the story, the folklorist Charlotte S. Burne, records the placename as 'Black Mere'.

== Physical dimensions ==
The pond is near circular with an approximate diameter of 50 yards (46 m). In 1958 a member of the British Sub-Aqua Club established that, at its deepest point, the pool is no more than 6 feet (1.8 m) deep and has a muddy bottom.
