= List of tumps =

Tump means a hillock, mound, barrow or tumulus. The Welsh words twmp and Twmpath may be related. Although many hill walking lists claim that the name comes from Thirty & Upward Metres Prominence, this is a backronym. The word is much older, dating from the 17th century.

Although some may appear similar to glacial drumlins, for the most part they are man-made, e.g. remains from mineral extraction, burial mounds (tumuli and especially bowl barrows) or motte-and-bailey castle mounds. The following geographical features in the UK are referred to using the word:

- Almondsbury Tump: a slight prominence near the top of the scarp, in open space near the Swan, Almondsbury, South Gloucestershire
- Barry's Hill Tump: a barrow in the civil parish of Leafield, Oxfordshire
- Battle Tump: a castle motte, Scheduled Ancient Monument, Lower Common, Gilwern, Monmouthshire
- Bettws Newydd tump: an early Norman motte-and-bailey tump in Monmouthshire
- Bledisloe Tump: a castle in Awre, Gloucestershire
- Brinklow Castle known locally as 'the Tump': a medieval castle in the village of Brinklow, Warwickshire
- Caple Tump: an earthwork reputed to be the remains of a castle motte in King's Caple, Herefordshire
- Castle Tump: an early 11th-century motte-and-bailey castle in Trecastle, Powys
- Castle Tump, Caerwent: site of a Roman villa in Monmouthshire
- Castle Tump, Dymock: a castle in Dymock, Gloucestershire
- Castle Tump Motte (see Glasbury Castle), Glasbury, Powys
- Castle Tump, Tenbury Wells: believed to be the remains of an early Norman motte-and-bailey castle near Burford, Shropshire and Tenbury Wells, Worcestershire
- Cole's Tump, an area of pillow mounds on the west side of Orcop Hill, Herefordshire, that overlooks the village of the same name
- Congrove Field and The Tumps: north of Bath (Bath and North East Somerset), possibly the site of mining activities in the past
- Crugyn Tump: castle mound/motte, Beguildy, Powys
- East Tump and West Tump: small (ca. 50m and 100m long respectively) tidal islands off the respective coasts of the Island of Grassholm
- Edmunds Tump: a hill near Grosmont in north-eastern Monmouthshire
- Hetty Pegler's Tump: a Neolithic burial mound near the village of Uley, Gloucestershire
- Knucklas Castle Mound: site of a castle near the battlefield of the Battle of Beguildy, Powys
- Llanthomas Castle Mound comprises the remains of a motte and ditch, near the village of Llanigon and the town of Hay-on-Wye
- Leigh Castle Tump: earthwork and buried remains of a medieval motte-and-bailey castle at Castle Green near Leigh, Worcestershire
- Loxidge Tump cairn: round cairn on the Offa's Dyke Path, Hatterrall Ridge, with Llanthony to one side and Llanveynoe the other; there are several other cairns nearby in general vicinity of Llanvihangel Crucorney
- Keynsham Humpy Tumps: site of open patches of grassland and bare rock, interspersed with blocks of scrub, alongside the Bristol to Bath railway line
- Maes Tump: an Iron Age hillfort in Somerset
- Monkey Tump: 12th-century motte castle in Tonteg, Rhondda Cynon Taf
- Nan Tow's Tump: a round barrow by the A46 near Oldbury-on-the-Hill, Gloucestershire
- Newcourt Tump: earthwork remains of a small motte-and-bailey castle 1 milenorth of Bacton, Herefordshire
- Newton Tump: remains of a motte-and-bailey castle 3 miles southeast of Clifford, Herefordshire
- Robin Hood's Tump (see under 'Buildings and structures'): prehistoric burial ground near Alpraham, Cheshire
- St Weonards Tump: immediately south of St Weonards churchyard, Herefordshire
- Slwch Tump: an Iron Age hill fort close to Brecon, Powys
- Stow Green Tump, also known as Castle Tump: remains of a castle near the village of St Briavels, Gloucestershire
- Swanborough Tump: a hillock in the parish of Manningford Abbots, Wiltshire, identified as the moot-place mentioned in the will of King Alfred
- Table Hill tump: in the Malvern Hills between North Hill and Sugarloaf Hill (Herefordshire–Worcestershire border)
- Tappa's Tump or "Tæppa's mound": burial mound near Taplow, Buckinghamshire
- "The Tump": ancient burial mound near Whittington, Worcestershire
- Tump Farm, Wilcrick: a farm near Wilcrick Hill, which was a hillfort in former Monmouthshire
- Tump Terret: mound marking the site of a small motte-and-bailey castle in Trellech, Monmouthshire
- Twmpath Castle, a motte-and-bailey castle in Rhiwbina, Cardiff
- Turkey Tump: on the ridge immediately north-west of Llanwarne, Herefordshire (SO504288)
- Wednesbury Tump (see 'Post-Medieval times'): Wednesbury, West Midlands
- Whittington Tump: central Worcestershire, a prehistoric religious site and location of a medieval castle
- Windmill Tump: a Neolithic burial site west of the village of Rodmarton, Gloucestershire
- Wormelow Tump: village in Herefordshire, location of the burial mound of King Arthur's son Amr

See also

- Burrow Mump: a mound at Burrowbridge in Somerset.
