= Stanton, Staffordshire =

Village in Staffordshire, England

Coordinates: 53.012°N 1.81°W

Stanton
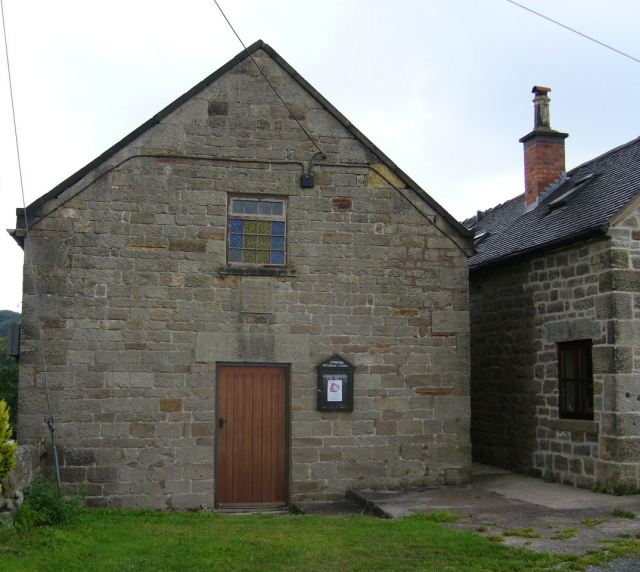
- Stanton Chapel. in Bankside, Stanton. The stone over the door is inscribed "Primitive Methodist Chapel erected at the sole expense of David Smith. AD 1824"

- Location within Staffordshire
- Population: 232
- OS grid reference: SK127461
- Civil parish: Stanton
- District: East Staffordshire
- Shire county: Staffordshire
- Region: West Midlands
- Country: England
- Sovereign state: United Kingdom
- Post town: ASHBOURNE
- Postcode district: DE6
- Dialling code: 01335
- Police: Staffordshire
- Fire: Staffordshire
- Ambulance: West Midlands
- UK Parliament: Burton

Stanton is a small village situated at the eastern end of the Weaver Hills, Staffordshire, England.

Stanton is located 146 miles (235.0 km) north-west of London and 18.4 miles (29.6 km) east of Stoke-on-Trent. It has a population of 232 according to the 2001 Census. The landscape around the village is mainly pastureland bounded by dry stone walls.

== History ==
Evidence of early human activity can be found at Stanton with three Bronze Age barrows on the hilltop of Thorswood. In 1953 a gold bracelet was found in the parish dated circa 800 BC, now housed in the Potteries Museum and Art Gallery, Stoke on Trent.

Stanton is listed in the Domesday Book as Stantone, the name means "Stone Farmstead" which could refer to its building material, some prominent stone or its site on stony ground. The stone itself is an excellent building material, mainly sandstone, being used to build the majority of farmhouses and cottages in the village.

In 1870–72, John Marius Wilson described Stanton in his Imperial Gazetteer of England and Wales as "a township-chapelry in Ellastone parish, Stafford; 2½ miles WNW of Clifton r. station, and 3½ W of Ashborne. Post town, Ashborne. Real property, £1,996. Pop., 403. Houses, 81. The living is annexed to Ellastone. Archbishop Sheldon was a native.".

During the 19th century, the stone was much prized for its quality and was quarried on a large scale. Many men were employed in the several quarries. Nearby Ilam Hall was built largely of sandstone quarried in Stanton. Towards the Weaver Hills the stone turns to limestone, which is used to build walls on the Weaver Hills. Between 1729 and 1860 lead and copper were mined at Thorswood, with at least eight shafts sunk into the hilltop, some of which were 640 feet (195 m) deep. Much of Stanton was part of the Earl of Shrewsbury’s Alton Estate and the Duncombe Estate. St Mary's church was built 1846–1847 by W.Evans of Manchester. Before 1846 the Stanton villagers had to travel over 2 miles (3.2 km) to St Peter's, Ellastone for worship.

=== Modern day ===
Like many villages, it has lost many of its facilities in recent years; its pub in 1946, its school in 1983 and its post office in 2001. The school was converted to a village hall that opened 1993, called the 'Gilbert Sheldon Hall'. In 1966, the Gilbert Sheldon Church of England School was declared a Grade II listed building. Also, two stables located north-east and west of the school are also Grade II. In 2004, Thorswood Nature Reserve was opened by Staffordshire Wildlife Trust which consists of 150 acres (0.61 km^{2}) of flower-rich unimproved pastures, upland heath and meadows.

== Famous residents ==
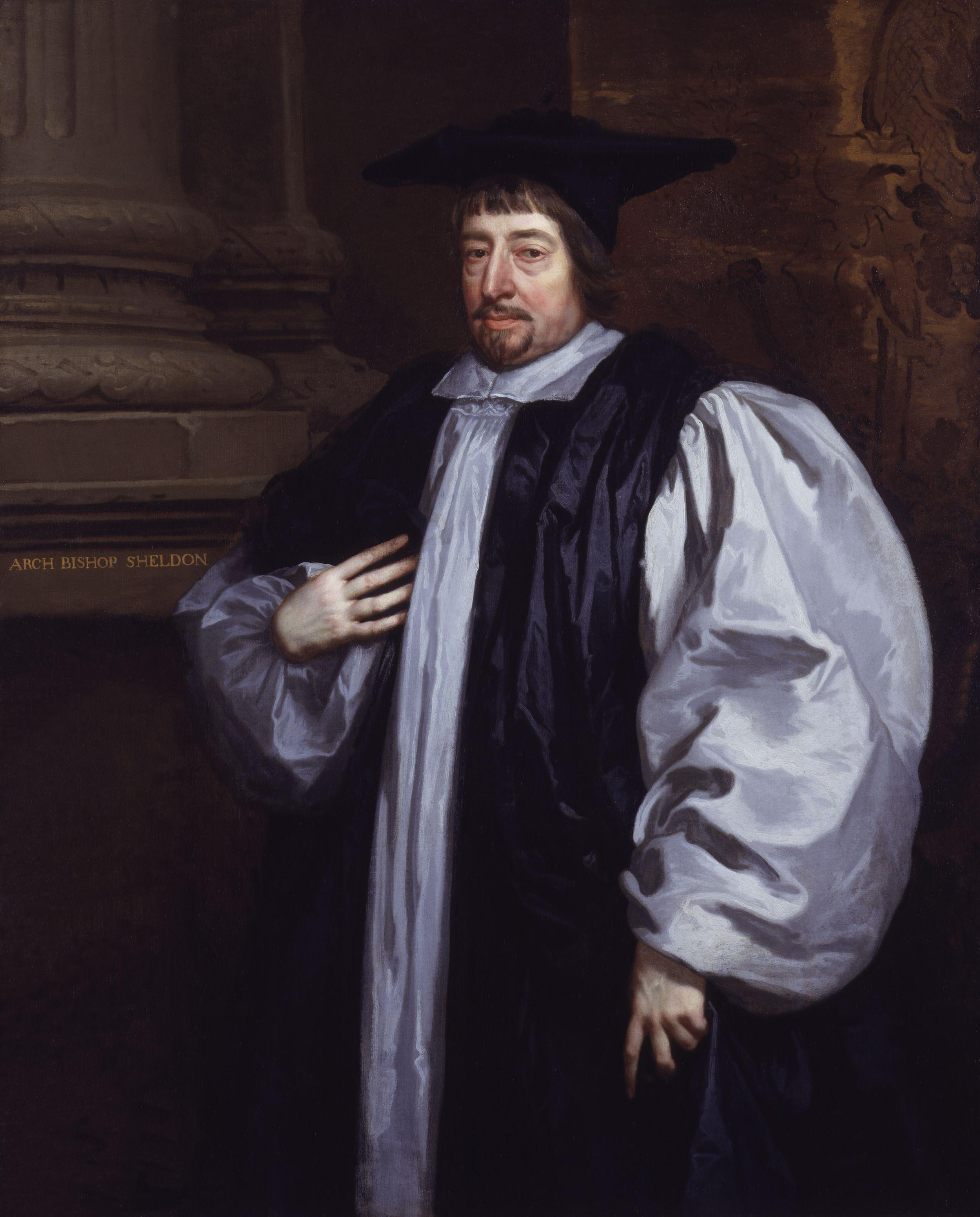
Gilbert Sheldon

Stanton is the birthplace of Gilbert Sheldon (1598–1677), who was the Archbishop of Canterbury between 1663 and 1677. Sheldon was also the chaplain to King Charles I during the English Civil War. The house of Sheldon's birth still exists in the centre of the village. He founded the Theatre at Oxford, the Sheldonian Theatre.

== Environment ==
Stanton is a very rural village which is surrounded by many woods and rivers. The Thorswood nature reserve is located nearby.

== Demographics ==
=== Population ===
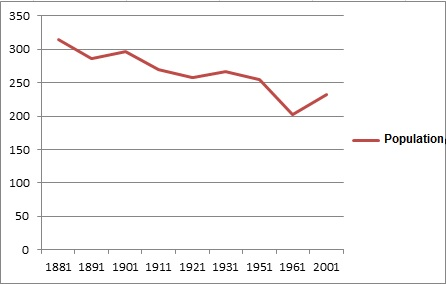
Population of Stanton over time

Historical population
Year	Pop.	±%
1841	392	—
1851	395	+0.8%
1861	401	+1.5%
1871	342	−14.7%
1881	315	−7.9%
1891	286	−9.2%
1901	297	+3.8%
1911	269	−9.4%
1921	257	−4.5%
1931	266	+3.5%
1951	251	−5.6%
1961	202	−19.5%
2001	232	+14.9%

The first census to mention Stanton was the census of 1841. The population was recorded as 392. The census was conducted every 10 years until 1961 (apart from 1941 due to World War II). Since 1961 the census changed to list information within some towns by wards, not by parish, hence the lack of data between 1961 and 2001. In 2001 a parish headcount was conducted in Stanton which placed the population at 232.

The population has fluctuated over the years, and decreased from its all-time high in 1861 by 46%. This is similar to in other rural villages, as many villagers have migrated to cities/large towns searching for work and better jobs. The increase of residents by 14.9% from 1961 to 2001 is an indicator of counter urbanization and peoples desire to live/retire in the 'rural idyll'.

The male:female ratio is split almost perfectly, with the village having 118 males and 114 females, of whom live in 90 households.

=== Occupation structure ===
In 1881, over half of the male labour force was engaged in agriculture with mining coming second. Females had either no occupation or were mainly employed in domestic service.]

== Politics ==
=== Institutional history ===
Stanton has belonged to multiple different councils and parishes throughout its history. Stanton was a part of the Church of England's ancient parish known as Ellastone, St Peter. However, from 1849 it swapped to its modern-day parish, which is Stanton, St Mary.

Regarding to local government, Stanton first belonged to Ellastone Civil Parish until 1866 when it became the Civil Parish of Stanton. The village belongs to the Hundred of Totmonslow South and from 1832 to 1934 it belonged to the District Council of Mayfield Rural District, it then became part of the Uttoxeter Rural District until 1974 before finally becoming part of the East Staffordshire Borough, which it is still a part of today.

=== Parliamentary representation ===
Between 1832 and 1867 Stanton belonged to the Parliamentary constituency of Northern Staffordshire, then it belonged to North Staffordshire until 1885 before changing to Leek from 1885 to 1918. Stanton once again swapped constituencies to Stone until 1948, from which date after it has belonged to Burton constituency.

=== Election results ===
Stanton, and its constituency of Burton are divided closely between the political parties of Labour and the Conservatives. In every election between 1950 and 1992, the Conservative party achieved a majority vote, albeit slim victories in a number of elections. The closest election was in 1966 in which the Tories won by only 277 votes. However, in the 1997 elections and every election since, the Labour party has received the majority of votes.

== Transport ==
=== By car ===
Stanton is accessible via roads through a series of small lanes which connect onto the A52 and/or the B5032. Sallyfield Lane and Dale Lane connect to the A52 while Marsh Lane connects onto Stanton Lane which in turn links to the B5032.

=== Bus ===
There are no bus services running through Stanton, despite it having a fairly new bus stop.

=== Train ===
Although there isn't a train station in the village of Stanton, there are a number of stations nearby. The closest are in Uttoxeter (9.3 miles (15.0 km)) and Derby (17.6 miles (28.3 km)).

== See also ==
- Listed buildings in Stanton, Staffordshire
