= Whittington Tump =

Mound in central Worcestershire, England

- Crookbarrow Hill
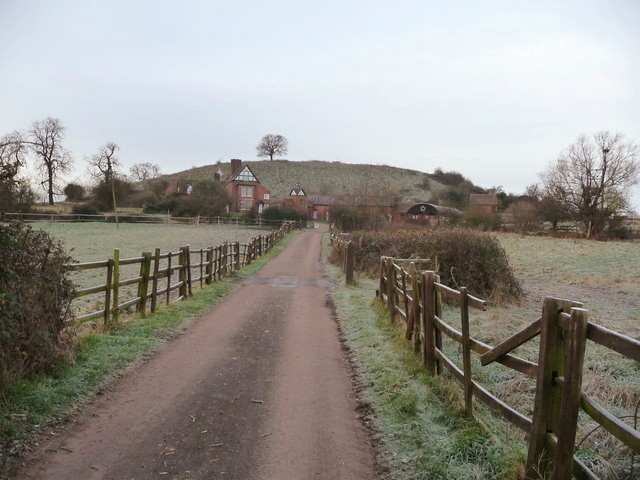
- Whittington Tump and Crookbarrow Farm from the north-east

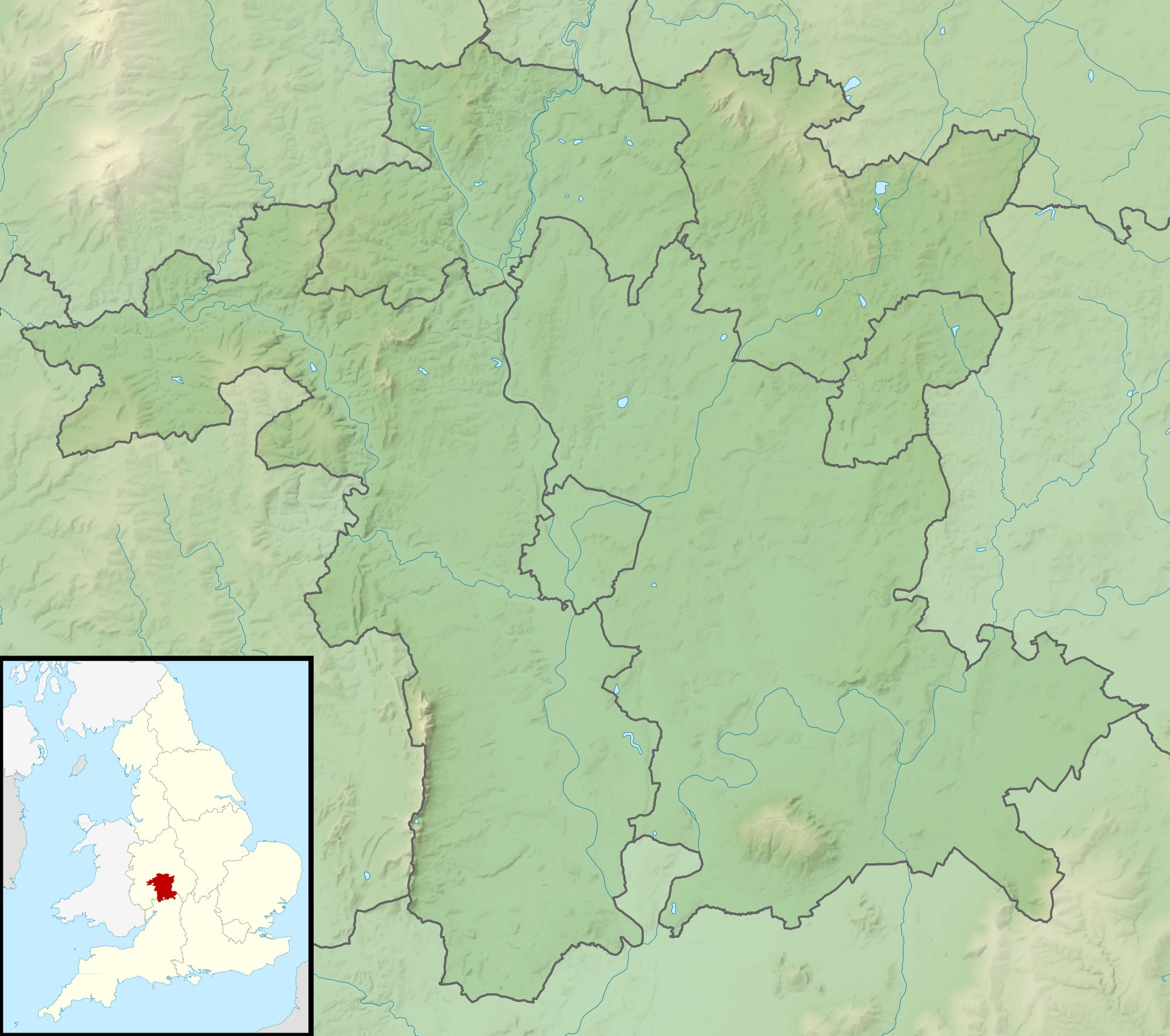
- Location in Worcestershire
- 52.1687°N 2.1843°W
- Type: Remains of motte castle and manor house
- Location: Worcestershire, England
- OS grid reference: SO 87486 52286

Scheduled monument
- Official name: Motte castle, moated site, and medieval agricultural remains at Crookbarrow Farm
- Designated: 10 August 1923
- Reference no.: 1014900

Whittington Tump or Crookbarrow Hill is a partly artificial mound in central Worcestershire, England. There is evidence of prehistoric activity at the site and may have been used as a religious site or burial mound. A Romano-British settlement was established nearby in the early 2nd century AD but was apparently abandoned by the 4th century. An Anglo-Saxon enclosure was established on Whittington Tump by the 7th century and during the mediaeval period it is thought to have been the site of a motte castle. Crookbarrow Manor was established at the foot of the hill by 1314 and the site, including the former motte, was given over to agricultural use. The site was listed as a scheduled monument in 1923 and is a landmark for motorists on the nearby M5 motorway.

== Description ==
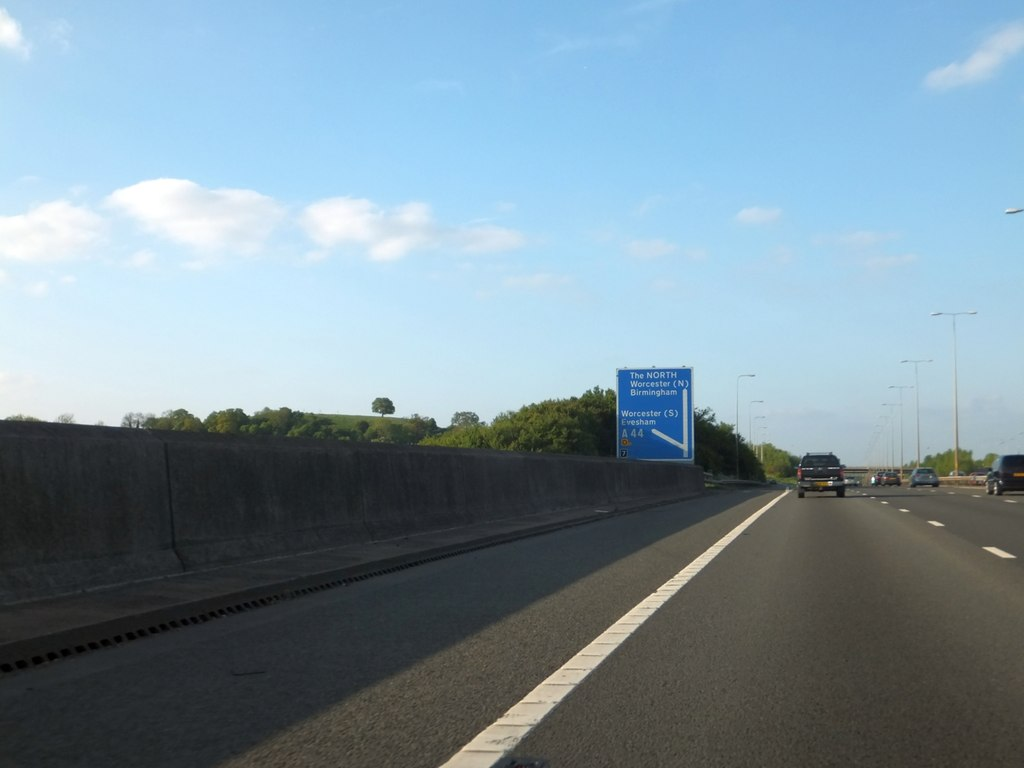
Whittington Tump from the M5 northbound

Whittington Tump (also known as Crookbarrow Hill) is located some 3 kilometres (1.9 mi) south-east of the city of Worcester and commands its southern approaches. The hill rises 20 metres (66 ft) above the valley floor and is approximately oval in plan, measuring 75 metres (246 ft) by 40 metres (130 ft). It has been described as an "enigmatic feature" with little known of its origin but it is believed to be an artificial enhancement of a natural hill. The side slopes, likely to have already been quite steep, have been steepened, particularly on the northern side. This interpretation has been made since at least the mid-19th century. The hill is overlain with reddish-brown clayey soil of the local Worcester Series.

Antiquarian John Price writing in 1799 thought that the names of the hill came from Old British but both Whittington and Crookbarrow are, at least partly, derived from Old English. Whittington is a development of the Old English "Hwinton" – meaning a farm or enclosure belonging to a man by the name of White. Crookbarrow comes from the Old British "crouka" and the Old English "beorg", both of which mean "barrow". Minor variants of this name were used throughout the mediaeval period. One of the more significant variants was "Cruchelle", known from the 1182 Red Book of Worcester.

The modern M5 motorway passes within 150 metres (490 ft) of the site to the south east. The tump, recognisable by a distinctive solitary tree on its top, is clearly visible from the motorway on the approaches to junction 7 (Worcester South) and is used by some motorists as a landmark.

== History ==
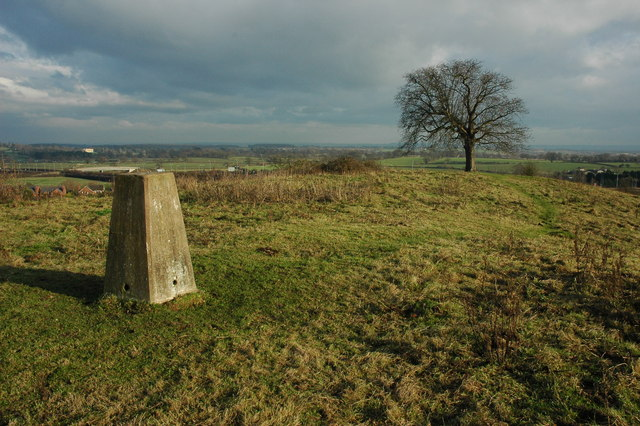
Triangulation pillar and tree on top of the tump

=== Early occupation ===
There is evidence of prehistoric activity at the site, a Neolithic scraper was found on the north-east side of Whittington Tump in 1886, and the hill would have formed an important landmark at this time. It has been posited that the site has prehistoric roots either as a religious monument or burial mound; Anglo-Saxon writings describe it as an ancient site. By the 18th-century it came to be regarded as a burial mound and one of the largest in England; though no evidence has been found to prove this hypothesis.

A Romano-British settlement site has also been located around 300 metres (330 yd) to the south of the site. This may have been a large farmstead, a hamlet or a small village – with the evidence hinting towards one of the latter. Archaeologists found evidence of ironworking as well as domestic activities dating from as early as the 2nd century AD; the site appears to have been abandoned by the 3rd or 4th centuries. Other Roman artefacts have been recovered from the north-east face of the tump. Owing to similarities with the name "Crookbarrow" the site was described by some antiquarians as the burial site of the 1st century AD British chieftain Caratacus, though he was probably buried in Rome where he died in captivity. Price stated in 1799 that the site had been fortified by the Romans and subsequently saw use as a burial site.

=== Anglo-Saxon and mediaeval eras ===
It is believed that an Anglo-Saxon enclosure, presumably that of White, was established by the 7th century AD. A settlement here would have had the advantage of fertile soil, a ready supply of water from Long Brook and good visibility over the surrounding land. The settlement is referred to in contemporary Anglo-Saxon documents as a widely known and visible landmark and was one of a number of Anglo-Saxon settlements in southern Worcestershire. Joseph Webster, writing in 1858 stated that Whittington Tump was an important spot from which laws passed in Middlesex were proclaimed.

A mediaeval manor known as Crookbarrow Manor is mentioned in a document of 1314 as being in the demesne of Alexander and Elizabeth de Montfort. The remains of a manor were discovered to the immediate east of the hill during archaeological investigations ahead of works to widen the M5 motorway. It is believed that this site had a primarily agricultural role. The manor site measured approximately 45 metres (148 ft) square and was surrounded by a moat that was probably originally revetted in masonry. There is evidence of mediaeval ridge and furrow farming to the north of the manor. The nearby village of Whittington may be a shrunken medieval village associated with the manor.

Archaeologists also believe that a motte castle was present on the summit of the hill during this period. The motte may have had a wooden or stone tower and a terrace on the north and west sides of the structure indicated that it was probably surrounded by a palisade or walkway. A number of square depressions on the top of Whittington Tump indicate the presence of structures some 3–4 metres (9.8–13.1 ft) wide. The motte was subject to ridge and furrow farming later in the mediaeval era after its abandonment. Prominent ridge and furrow remains are evident on the north and west side of the hill on a north-west to south-east alignment.

=== Modern era ===
The south-west corner of the former manor site was occupied by Crookbarrow Farm from the 17th century. Continued agricultural use of the area has resulted in an earth bank (lynchet) forming against the base of the hill, this is particularly visible on the west and south-west faces of the hill. In some areas, the lynchet has since been planted with trees and utilised as a field boundary. The south-east and northern parts of the former manor house moat survive and remain visible as a ditch up to 10 metres (33 ft) wide and 2.5 metres (8.2 ft) deep.

The entire site (described as a "motte castle, moated site, and medieval agricultural remains") was listed as a scheduled monument on 10 August 1923. This was because the castle has been described as a good example of a motte structure and the tump may preserve details of the original construction such as post holes or foundations. The site is described in the listing documentation as an important record of the political and social organisation of Worcestershire during the medieval period.

As part of the retriangulation of Great Britain a triangulation pillar was erected on top of the tump by 1948.
