= Thorswood =

Nature reserve in Staffordshire, England

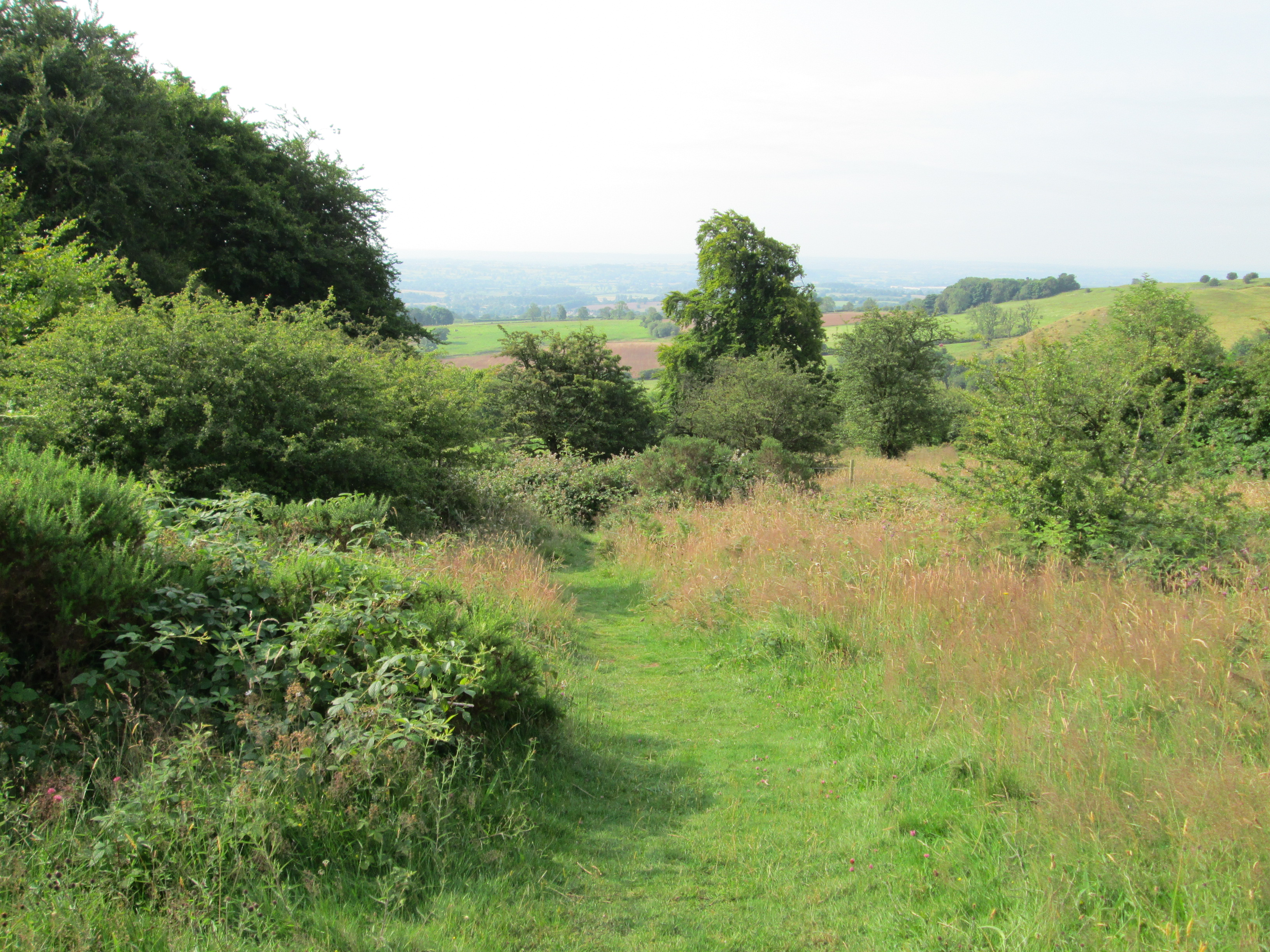

- Location within Staffordshire
- Location: near Stanton, Staffordshire
- OS grid: SK 113 470
- Coordinates: 53.020°N 1.832°W
- Area: 81 hectares (200 acres)
- Operator: Staffordshire Wildlife Trust
- Website: Thorswood

Thorswood is a nature reserve of the Staffordshire Wildlife Trust, situated in the Weaver Hills near the village of Stanton, in Staffordshire, England. It is a Site of Special Scientific Interest.

== Description ==
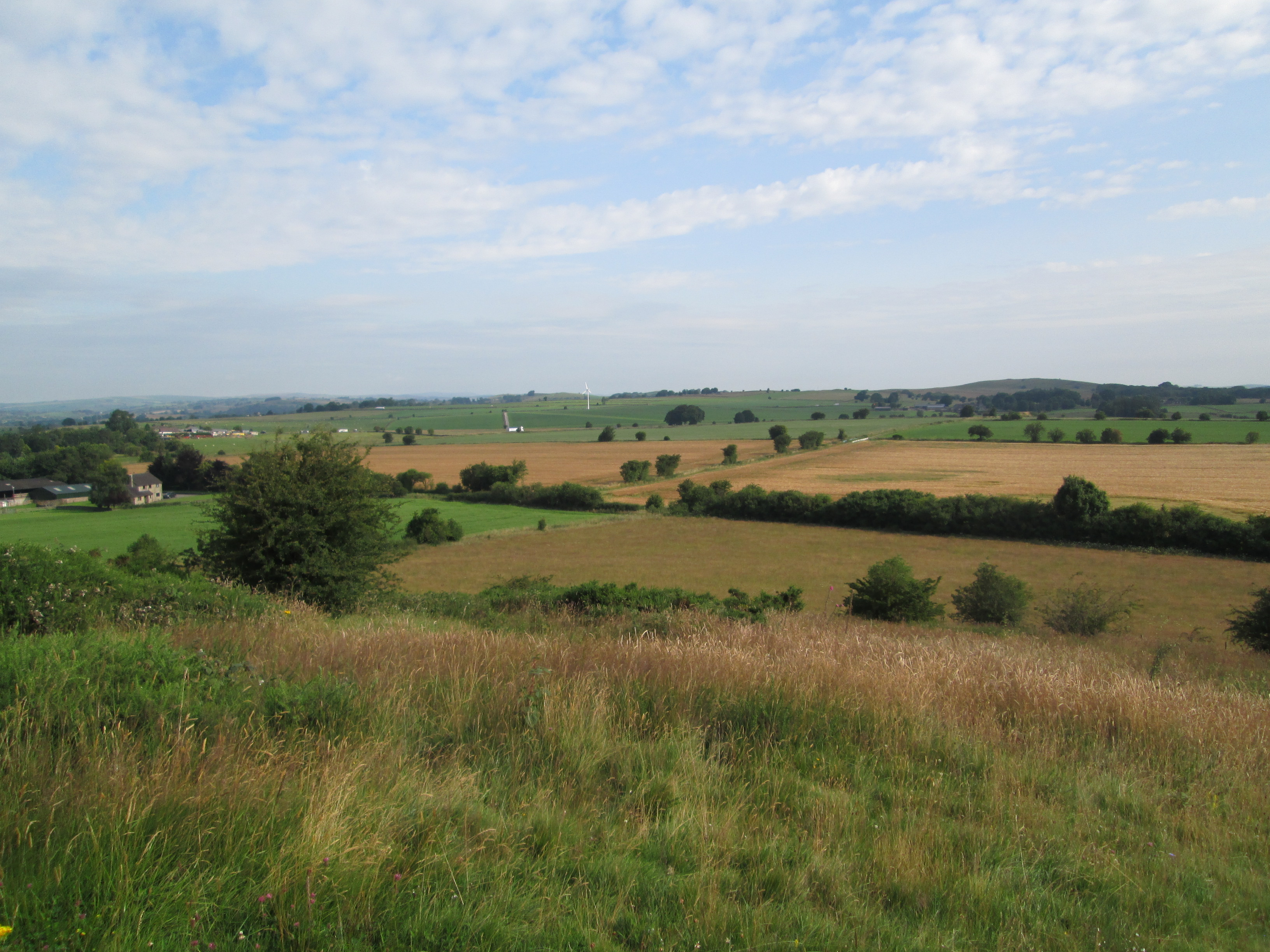
View north from the reserve

Its area is 81 hectares (200 acres); the terrain is steep in places.

There are hay meadows on low-lying ground, where ox-eye daisy, knapweed and betony may be found with the tall grasses. On the limestone grassland of the higher ground, there are low-growing flowering plants including salad burnet, cowslip and wild thyme.

Instead of intensive farming practices, there is light grazing and traditional farming techniques, some fields being mown to make hay; the grazing and mowing prevents the grass becoming overgrown and smothering the rarer plants.

=== History and prehistory ===
There are three Bronze Age bowl barrows within the reserve; they are scheduled monuments. Lead mining, dating back to the 17th century, took place at Thorswood; the remains of this activity survive in parts of the reserve as extensive hillocks, up to 3 metres (9.8 ft) high, and a number of shafts have been identified. The remains are a scheduled monument. Visitors to the reserve are advised to keep to the marked trails where indicated, in order to avoid mineshafts.
