= Listed buildings in Stanton, Staffordshire =

Stanton is a civil parish in the district of East Staffordshire, Staffordshire, England. The parish contains 18 listed buildings that are recorded in the National Heritage List for England. All the listed buildings are designated at Grade II, the lowest of the three grades, which is applied to "buildings of national importance and special interest". The parish contains the village of Stanton and the surrounding countryside. Most of the listed buildings are in the village, and consist of a church and a chapel, and associated structures, a school, farmhouses, farm buildings, and cottages. The listed buildings outside the village are a cross base and shaft, and a milepost.

== Buildings ==
Name and location	Photograph	Date	Notes
Ousley Cross base and shaft 52.99804°N 1.81440°W		15th century (probable)	The cross base and shaft are in stone. The base is square with a square socket, and the shaft, which is about 3 feet (0.91 m) high, has a square section.
Chryssie Cottage; 53.01176°N 1.81239°W	—	17th century (probable)	The house, which was remodelled in the 19th century, is in stone and has a tile roof with coped verges. There are two storeys and three bays. The doorway has a cambered arch, most of the windows are casements with chamfered mullions, and there are two skylights.
Gilbert Sheldon School; 53.01177°N 1.81312°W		18th century	The former school, which was remodelled and extended in the 19th century, is in stone with a tile roof. It has one storey, the south front has four bays, and a lower gabled projection to the left with painted bargeboards. The windows have chamfered surrounds, and there are gabled dormers.
Stable northeast of Gilbert Sheldon School; 53.01184°N 1.81273°W		18th century	The stable is in stone and has a tile roof with coped verges on kneelers. There are two bays, and it contains doorways, a stable door, a loft door and casement windows. (Note: Street View in June 2011 shows that the stable has been converted for residential use.)
Wellcroft Farmhouse; 53.01062°N 1.80911°W	—	18th century	The farmhouse, which has been altered and extended, is in stone and has a tile roof with coped verges. There are two storeys and three bays, and the windows are iron casements.
Farm building, Wellcroft Farm; 53.01093°N 1.80951°W	—	18th century	The farm building was largely rebuilt in the 19th century. It is in stone with quoins, and has an asbestos corrugated roof. The building contains a carriage arch, doorways, a stable door, windows, a mullioned loft window, a loft door, and an oculus.
Stanton Methodist Chapel and Chapel House; 53.01338°N 1.81575°W		1824	The chapel and attached cottage are in stone and have tile roofs with cope verges. The chapel has two bays, and above the doorway is a datestone with an inscription. To the right, the cottage has one storey and an attic and two bays.
Pump Cottage; 53.01220°N 1.81357°W		Early 19th century	A stone cottage that has a tile roof with coped verges. There are two storeys and two bays, and the windows are mullioned casements.
Stable west of Gilbert Sheldon School; 53.01194°N 1.81405°W		Early 19th century	The former stable is in stone and has a tile roof with coped verges. There is one storey and a loft, three bays, a single-storey projecting extension to the left with a slate roof, and a low lean-to extension to the right with a corrugated iron roof. The building contains three ground floor doors, two loft doors, one approached by external steps, two small casement windows, and loft vents.
Stables and cartshed northeast of St Mary's Church; 53.01122°N 1.81286°W	—	Early 19th century	The stables and cartshed are in stone with a tile roof. There is one storey and a loft, and four bays. The building contains a segmental-headed carriage arch, stable doors, window openings, and external steps in the right gable end leading up to a loft door.
The School House, wall and gate 53.01146°N 1.81315°W		Early 19th century	The house is in stone with a hipped slate roof. There are two storeys, an L-shaped plan, and a front of three bays. The central doorway has a raised surround and a rectangular fanlight. The windows have raised surrounds and decorative glazing, and most have chamfered mullions. In front of the garden is a rounded boundary wall about 5 feet (1.5 m) high, containing a small cast iron gate.
Paddock Farmhouse; 53.01410°N 1.81937°W	—	c. 1840	A stone farmhouse with a tile roof. The main block has two storeys and an attic, and three bays, and there are two parallel two-storey rear wings at right angles. The central doorway has a rectangular fanlight, most of the windows have chamfered mullions, and there is a gabled dormer.
St Mary's Church and walls 53.01077°N 1.81378°W		1846–47	The church is in stone with a tile roof, and is in Early English style. It consists of a nave, a south porch, a lower chancel, and a north vestry. At the west end is a gabled bellcote, and the windows are lancets, triple at the east end, and double at the west end. The churchyard is enclosed by stone walls.
Pigsties, Paddock Farm; 53.01421°N 1.81927°W	—	Mid-19th century	The pigsties are in stone with a tile roof, and have an L-shaped plan, and two bays. They contain a central door, and two cantilevered feeding chutes leading to stone troughs.
Stable and cartshed, Paddock Farm; 53.01404°N 1.81875°W	—	Mid-19th century	The stable and cartshed are in stone and have a tile roof with coped verges. There is one storey and a loft, three bays, and a low extension to the right. The building contains stable doors, a blocked carriage arch with a pointed segment head, a casement window, and a horse trough.
Stables and granary, Paddock Farm; 53.01419°N 1.81890°W	—	Mid-19th century	The stables and granary are in stone and have a corrugated asbestos roof with coped verges. There is one storey and a loft, three bays, and a low extension to the right. The building contains two top opening casement windows, and there are external steps leading up to a loft door.
Milepost at N.G.R. SK 11314833; 53.03233°N 1.83271°W		Mid- to late 19th century	The milepost is on the east side of the A52 road. It is in cast iron with a triangular plan and a cambered top. On the top is inscribed "STANTON", and on the sides are the distances to Froghall, Cheadle, Hanley, Stoke-on-Trent, Newcastle-under-Lyme, and Ashbourne.
Boldershaw Farmhouse; 53.01190°N 1.81142°W		Undated	The farmhouse, later a private house, is in stone with a tile roof. There are two storeys, the main block has three bays, and to the left is a two-bay extension. The main block has a central gabled porch and casement windows with chamfered mullions, and the extension also contains casement windows.

== Notes and references ==
=== Sources ===
- Historic England, "Ousley Cross base and shaft at N.G.R. SK 12554452, Stanton (1232005)", National Heritage List for England
- Historic England, "Chryssie Cottage, Stanton (1231937)", National Heritage List for England
- Historic England, "The Gilbert Sheldon Church of England (C) School, Stanton (1232001)", National Heritage List for England
- Historic England, "Stable approximately 10 yards north-east of Gilbert Sheldon Church of England (C) School, Stanton (1231938)", National Heritage List for England
- Historic England, "Wellcroft Farmhouse, Stanton (1231942)", National Heritage List for England
- Historic England, "Agricultural building approximately 50 yards north of Wellcroft Farmhouse, Stanton (1232030)", National Heritage List for England
- Historic England, "Stanton Methodist Chapel and Chapel Cottage, Stanton (1231940)", National Heritage List for England
- Historic England, "Pump Cottage, Stanton (1277339)", National Heritage List for England
- Historic England, "Stable approximately 30 yards west of Gilbert Sheldon Church of England (C) School, Stanton (1231928)", National Heritage List for England
- Historic England, "Stable and cartshed approximately 100 yards north-east of Church of St. Mary, Stanton (1232020)", National Heritage List for England
- Historic England, "The School House and front boundary wall and gate, Stanton (1277267)", National Heritage List for England
- Historic England, "Paddock Farmhouse, Stanton (1231930)", National Heritage List for England
- Historic England, "Church of St. Mary and churchyard walls, Stanton (1231927)", National Heritage List for England
- Historic England, "Pigsties approximately immediately east of Paddock Farmhouse, Stanton (1232006)", National Heritage List for England
- Historic England, "Stable and cartshed approximately 30 yards south-east of Paddock Farmhouse, Stanton (1277342)", National Heritage List for England
- Historic England, "Stables and granary approximately 10 yards east of Paddock Farmhouse, Stanton (1231933)", National Heritage List for England
- Historic England, "Milepost at N.G.R. SK 11314833, Stanton (1232000)", National Heritage List for England
- Historic England, "Boldershaw Farmhouse, Stanton (1231935)", National Heritage List for England
- Historic England, Listed Buildings
- Pevsner, Nikolaus (1974), Staffordshire, The Buildings of England, Harmondsworth: Penguin Books, ISBN 0-14-071046-9
