= William Thomas (antiquary) =

English Anglican priest and antiquary (1670–1738)

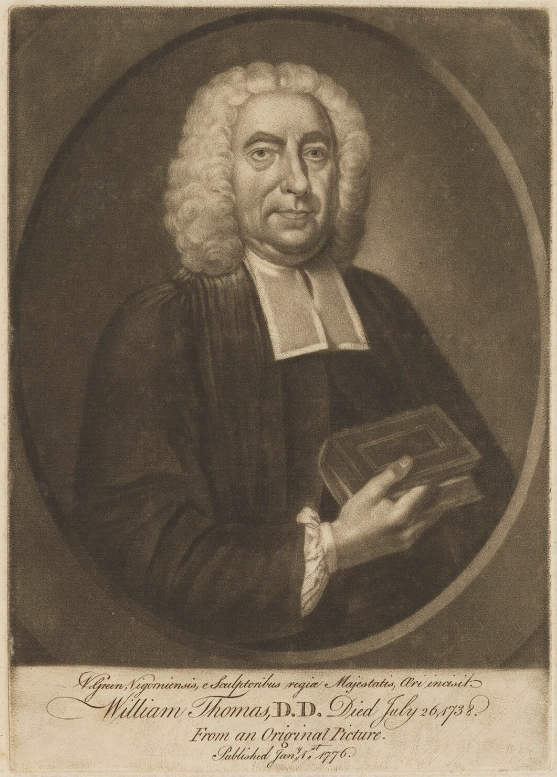
Mezzotint of William Thomas by Valentine Green, after George Powle, published 1776

William Thomas (1670–1738) was an English clergyman and antiquary. He was educated at Westminster School and Trinity College, Cambridge, from which he received two degrees. Through the influence of distant relation John Somers, 1st Baron Somers, he was granted the living of Exhall in Warwickshire and later became rector of St Nicholas in Worcester. Thomas received two further degrees in divinity in the 1720s, including a doctorate. As part of his work as an antiquary Thomas visited every church in Worcestershire and transcribed many documents, including the now lost Red Book of Worcester.

== Life ==
Thomas was born in 1670, the only son of John Thomas and his wife Mary (née Bagnal). He was the grandson of the Welsh bishop of Worcester William Thomas (1613–1689). From 1685 Thomas attended Westminster School. He was elected to a scholarship at Trinity College, Cambridge, on 25 June 1688. Whilst at the college Thomas contributed verses to the collection of poetry published by the university on the birth of James Francis Edward Stuart, who briefly became Prince of Wales. Thomas graduated with a bachelor of arts degree in 1691 and received a master of arts degree in 1695. He was a Fellow of Trinity College from 1694.

In 1700 Thomas travelled to France and Italy where he became a close friend of Sir John Pakington, 4th Baronet. After his return he was granted the living of Exhall in Warwickshire through the influence of John Somers, 1st Baron Somers, a distant relation. Thomas maintained a considerable estate at Atherstone and another near Toddington, Gloucestershire. He was married to Elizabeth Carter of Brill, Buckinghamshire. In 1721 he moved to Worcester, where he also sent his children for education.

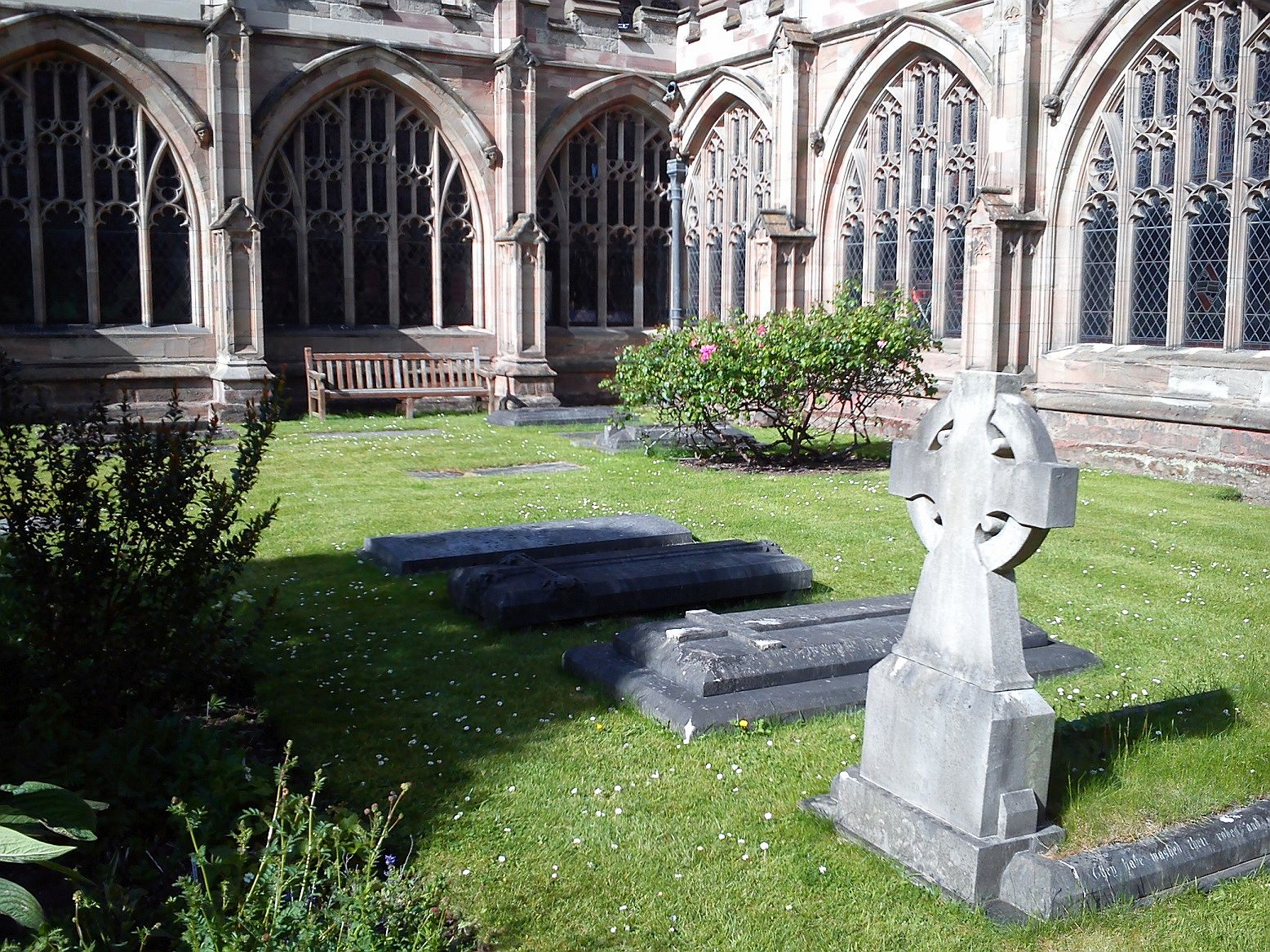
Worcester Cathedral cloisters

In 1723 Thomas was awarded the living of the church of St Nicholas in Worcester, as rector, by John Hough, Bishop of Worcester. He was awarded a bachelor of divinity degree in 1723 and became a doctor of divinity in 1729. Thomas died on 26 July 1738 and was buried in the cloisters of Worcester Cathedral.

== Antiquarianism ==
Thomas was a keen antiquary with a particular interest in the history of Worcestershire. He revised and completed a work discussing Chaucer's life and works started by John Urry and John Dart; this was published in London 1721. Thomas aspired to writing a history of Worcestershire and in furtherance of this goal transcribed many old documents and visited every church in the county. Thomas is said to have been so devoted to his work as an antiquary that he allowed himself little time for sleep, eating or leisure. Thomas published Antiquitates Prioratus Majoris Malverne in agro Wicciensi, an eight volume work, in London in 1725. He edited the second edition of Sir William Dugdale's Antiquities of Warwickshire, published in two volumes in London in 1730, and compiled a separately published index to that work. Thomas published A Survey of the Cathedral Church of Worcester, with an account of the Bishops thereof in London in 1736. He also transcribed the Red Book of Worcester, a 13th-century survey of the holdings of the Bishop of Worcester. The original manuscript of the Red Book has since been lost.

== Legacy ==
Thomas's collection of documents was used by Treadway Russell Nash in writing his history of Worcestershire. Nash included a mezzotint portrait of Thomas by Valentine Green in the work when it was published in 1781. Thomas's papers on Worcestershire are now held by the Society of Antiquaries of London. A copy of Thomas's A Survey of the Cathedral Church of Worcester is held in the Royal Collection, possibly having been acquired by William IV.
