= Trecastle =

Village in Powys, Wales

Coordinates: 51.950°N 3.631°W

Trecastle: Welsh: Trecastell
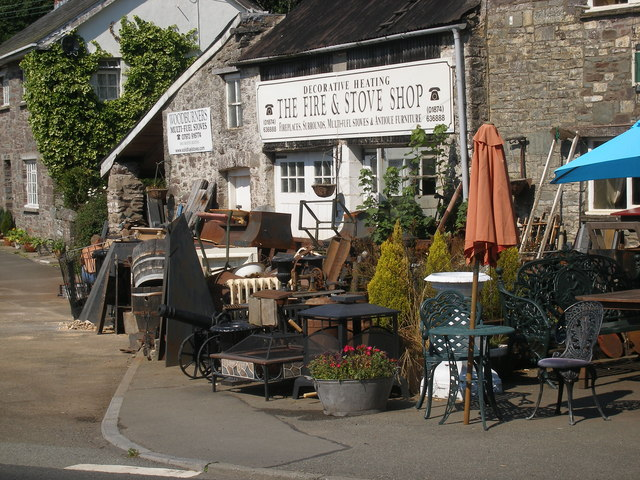

- Location within Powys
- OS grid reference: SN929291
- Principal area: Powys
- Preserved county: Powys
- Country: Wales
- Sovereign state: United Kingdom
- Post town: BRECON
- Postcode district: LD3
- Dialling code: 01874
- Police: Dyfed-Powys
- Fire: Mid and West Wales
- Ambulance: Welsh
- UK Parliament: Brecon, Radnor and Cwm Tawe
- Senedd Cymru – Welsh Parliament: Brecon & Radnorshire

Trecastle (Welsh: Trecastell) ("the town of the castle") is a village in Powys, Wales, situated on the edge of the Brecon Beacons National Park (Welsh: Parc Cenedlaethol Bannau Brycheiniog) and in the community of Llywel. The village has a population of about 200.

== History ==
Trecastle is named after Castle Tump (Trecastle Motte) an early 11th-century Norman motte-and-bailey fortification , built by Bernard de Neufmarche and designed to protect Brecon from attack from the west. Despite this purpose, the area continued to be threatened, with Edward I of England spending three days in Trecastle quelling a revolt in 1295. The old castle name of 'una villa nostra de Lliwel' was changed by the end of the Medieval era to the local name Trecastle, "the town of the castle". The fortification still exists at the east end of the village and the motte is 21 feet (6.4 m) high; the largest of its type in the National Park.

From around the 12th century the Bishop of St David's owned the land to the west of the book and Trecastle was thus used as a staging post en route to the cathedral. After leaving the stopping point the road is thought to have turned to follow the Roman Road near Y Pigwn. Centuries later, Trecastle was used by coach travellers as a stopping point on the route from Gloucester to Llandovery.

In the 19th century Trecastle had eight annual fairs, its own gasworks, two schools, a grain mill, two smithies, 16 shops and numerous pubs. Between 1830 and 1914, Trecastle and Llywel are said to have had two of the most important wool mills in Brecknockshire. The arrival of the railway in Sennybridge meant that Trecastle lost its place as the trading centre for the area.

Trecastle is situated on the A40 trunk road between Brecon and Llandovery, which largely follows the old coaching route and passes a monument to a coach crash in the 19th century between Trecastle and Llandovery. The village was extended in 1960 to 1970s but maintains its linear pattern. It is now known for its antique trade.

The area to the west side of the Nant Logyn was historically seen as a different settlement, named Bishop's Town.

== Monuments and buildings ==
Trecastle's history makes it one of the longest-established Brecknockshire villages, thus the Motte & Bailey is considered an important ancient & medieval monument and the village contains a number of listed Georgian and Medieval properties.

Listed buildings in Trecastle include;

- Castle Tump (Trecastle motte and bailey), early 11th-century scheduled CADW ancient monument.
- Ty Newydd Calvinistic Methodist Chapel, 18th-19th century
- The Schoolhouse (now Trecastle Antiques), 19th-century Victorian Gothic schoolhouse.
- Neuadd Farm (Cambridge House), dating from the 16th century. Includes dovecote and other outbuildings.
- Dan Y Coed (The Old Vicarage), early 18th century. Includes coach house and outbuildings.
- Castle House (now the Castle Coaching Inn), 19th century.
- The Three Horseshoes Inn, 18th-19th century.
- Pendre Smithy and Cottages, 18th-19th century.

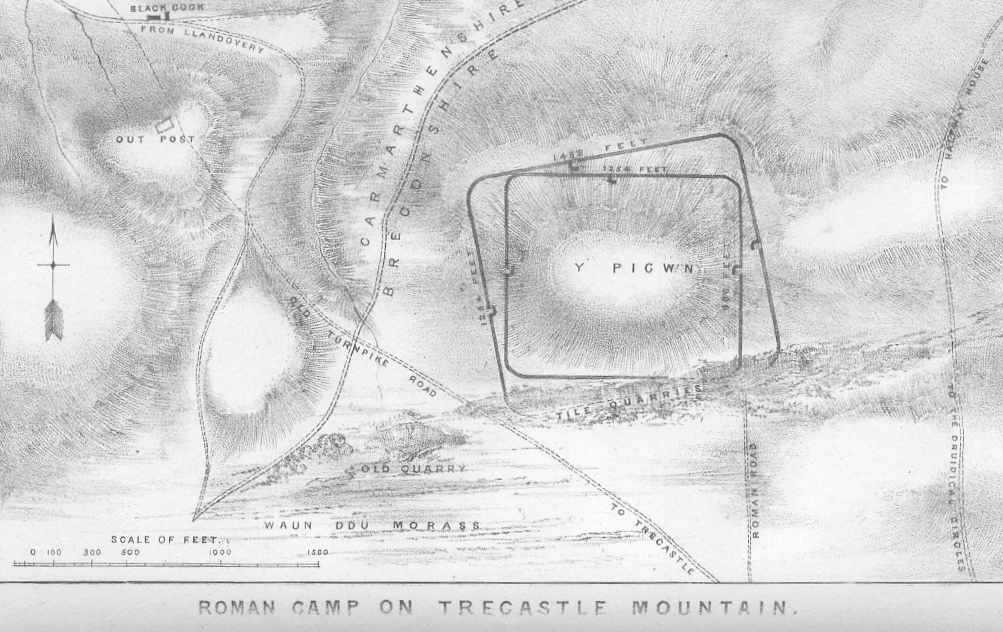
Y Pigwm, Trecastle, Breconshire. Plan of the Roman Marching Camps at Y Pigwm [The Beacon], drawn by William Rees in 1854

Near the village is the site of Y Pigwn. This consists of two overlaying Roman practice marching camps which are on the summit of Trecastle Mountain. They have been described as 'amongst the best-preserved and best-known Roman temporary camps in Wales. The camps were first discovered 1849 and were planned and described by William Rees at the meeting of the Cambrian Archaeological Association at Breconin 1853. Rees also illustrates Bronze Age burial urns which were found by a Mr Holford in nearby burial mounds. The "Y Pigwm" camps are close to the presumed Roman road linking the Roman Forts at Llandovery and Brecon Gaer, and a small Roman fortlet at "Waun Ddu" lies 700m to the West. There are standing stones and a stone circle nearby.

== Government ==
Trecastle is within the Maescar & Llywel electoral ward for Powys County Council, Brecon and Radnorshire constituency in the Senedd and Brecon, Radnor and Cwm Tawe constituency in the UK Parliament.
