= Weaver Hills =

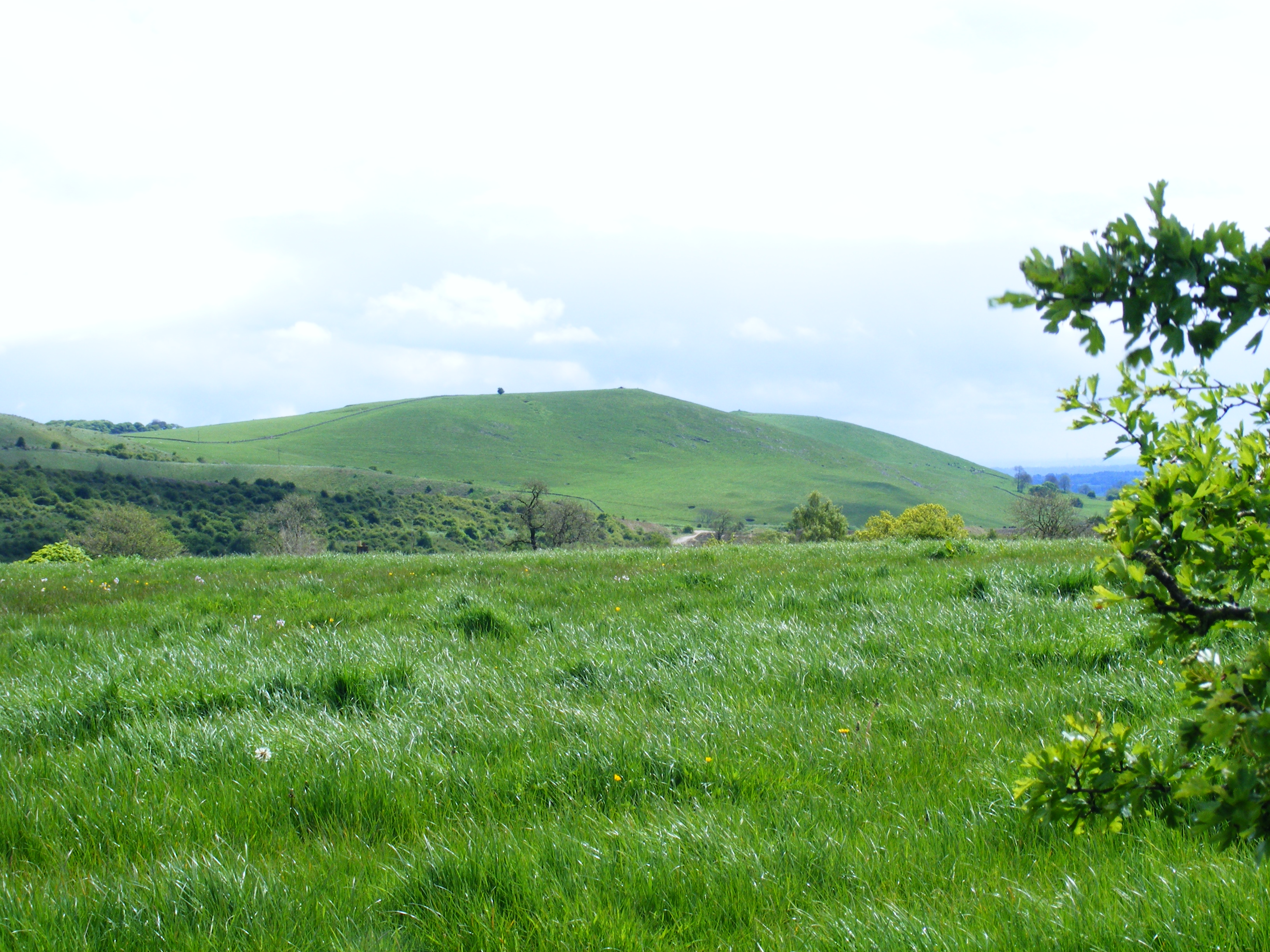
- Weaver Hills from the west

Highest point
- Coordinates: 53.0148°N 1.8603°W

Geography
- Location within Staffordshire
- Location: England
- OS grid: SK085470

The Weaver Hills are a small range of hills in north east Staffordshire, England.

The Weaver Hills are about 15 miles (24 km) east of Stoke-on-Trent and about 5 miles (8 km) west of Ashbourne, Derbyshire, just south of the A52 road and north of the Churnet Valley. The area is often considered to be the southernmost main hills and Carboniferous Limestone rock strata of the Pennines. Although outside the National Park boundary, the hills are geologically in the White Peak area of the Peak District.

The main peak, known as The Walk, with an Ordnance Survey trig point, is 371 metres (1,217 ft) above sea level. The southern slopes are rather steep, overlooking the hamlets of Ramsor and Wootton, while the north is more gently sloped towards the Staffordshire Moorlands district. The ten or more tumuli on or around the Weaver Hills, including Cauldon Low (a peak in the same range just to the east) imply significant prehistoric settlements in the area.

About a mile south of the main peak is Wootton Lodge and Wootton Hall, whose claims to fame include that Jean-Jacques Rousseau rented the Hall in 1766. He was a refugee from France, where his revolutionary ideas made life difficult for him. However, the peace and tranquility which had so attracted him to the area nearly drove him mad, because he could not leave his fears behind. Arthur Mee says,

He was filled with the embittered suspicions of a hunted animal, seeing enmity and treachery in his friends and deadly foes in his neighbours

== Wardlow Quarry ==
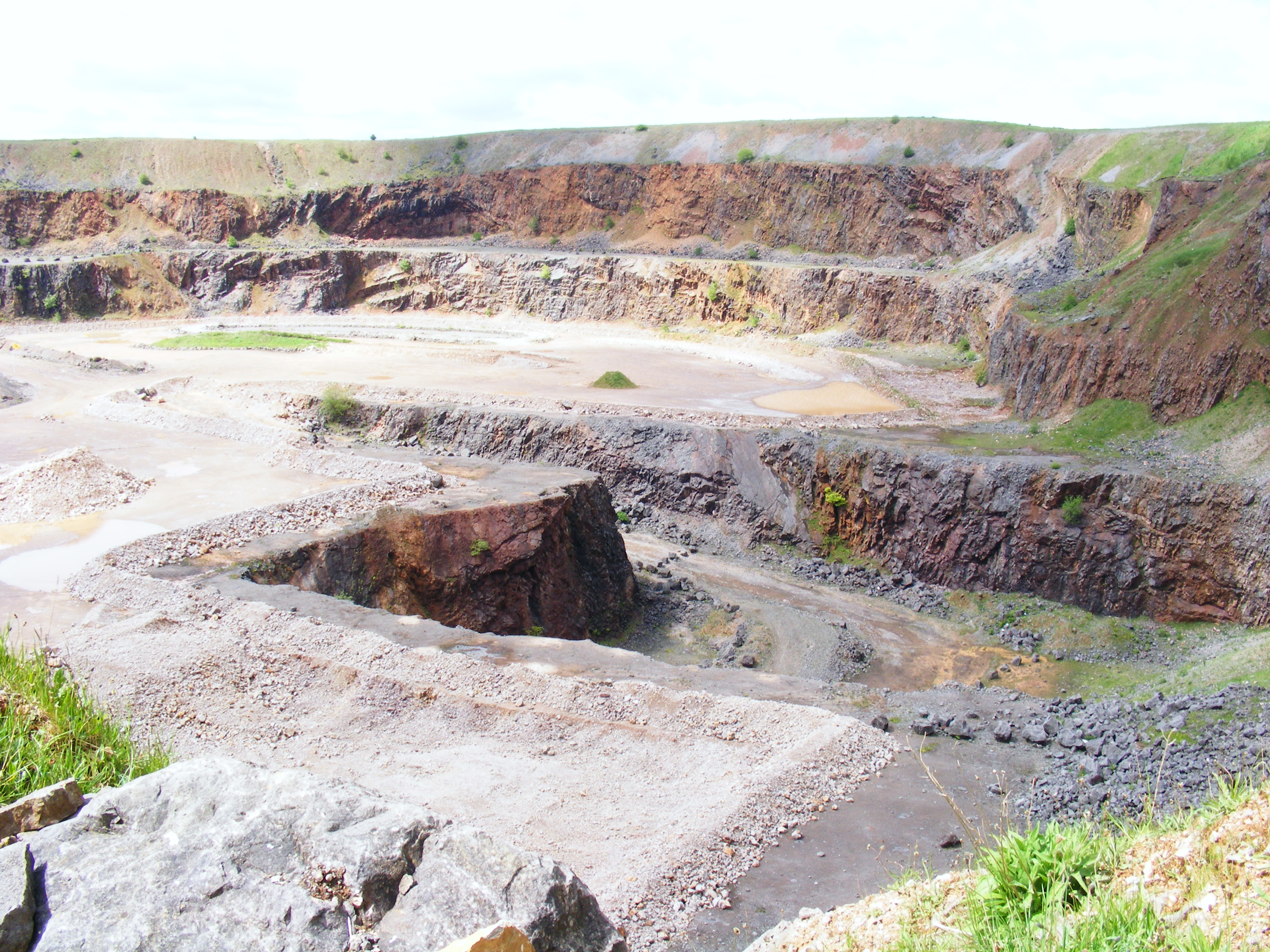
Wardlow Quarry.

Wardlow Quarry is a large quarry on the north-east side of the main peak, just off the A52 main road from Ashbourne to The Potteries. It is a limestone quarry, owned by Tarmac, but not being worked (May 2009). The nearby quarries at Cauldon Low are in use for cement production.

== See also ==
- Thorswood
