= Castle Tump =

11th-century castle in Powys, Wales

Coordinates: 51.94908°N 3.63102°W

Trecastle: Welsh: Trecastell
- Location within Powys
- OS grid reference: SN929291
- Principal area: Powys
- Preserved county: Powys
- Country: Wales
- Sovereign state: United Kingdom
- Postcode district: LD3
- Police: Dyfed-Powys
- Fire: Mid and West Wales
- Ambulance: Welsh

Castle Tump (Trecastle Motte) is an early 11th-century motte and bailey castle in Trecastle, Powys, Wales.

== History ==
This early 11th-century Norman motte-and-bailey fortification was built by Bernard de Neufmarche, the half-brother of William the Conqueror. It is thought to have fallen to a Welsh attack sometime between 1121 and 1136, and after short abandonment was possibly rebuilt by Walter Clifford in the 1150s, with Edward I of England spending three days in Trecastle quelling a revolt in 1295.

At 6.6 m high it is the largest motte and bailey the Brecon Beacons National Park (Welsh: Parc Cenedlaethol Bannau Brycheiniog). The motte is 50 m by 38 m, with a flat summit of 24 m by 16 m, and the bailey (to the south west side of the motte) is 56 m by 40 m. The original footprint of the bailey platform was 115 m long by 45 m wide. Originally both motte and bailey were ditched and counterscarped, similar to other 12th- and 13th-century castles in Wales; however, the absence of stonework indicated the castle did not retain importance beyond this period.

Presently it is the best-preserved motte and bailey in Breconshire, and the oval tree-clad motte dominates the east end of the village.

== Village name ==
The village takes its name from the old motte and bailey, whose original name was 'una villa nostra de Lliwel', although to this day Llywel is the name of the neighbouring hamlet, local parish and electoral ward. The local name Trecastle emerged by the end of the Medieval period, meaning "the town of the castle".
