= Bowl barrow =

Type of ancient funerary monument

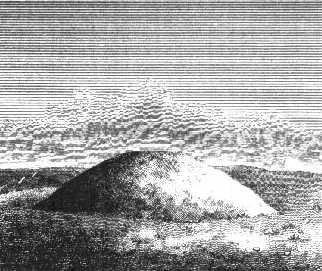
Engraving of a bowl barrow by Richard Colt Hoare

A bowl barrow is a type of burial mound or tumulus. A barrow is a mound of earth used to cover a tomb. The bowl barrow gets its name from its resemblance to an upturned bowl. Related terms include cairn circle, cairn ring, howe, kerb cairn, tump and rotunda grave.

== Description ==
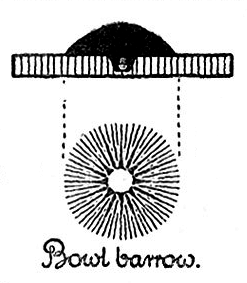
Section and plan of a generic bowl barrow

Bowl barrows were created from the Neolithic through to the Bronze Age in Great Britain. A bowl barrow is an approximately hemispherical mound covering one or more Inhumations or cremations. Where the mound is composed entirely of stone, rather than earth, the term cairn replaces the word barrow. The mound may be simply a mass of earth or stone, or it may be structured by concentric rings of posts, low stone walls, or upright stone slabs. In addition, the mound may have a kerb of stones or wooden posts.

Barrows were usually built in isolation in various situations on plains, valleys and hill slopes, although the most popular sites were those on hilltops. Bowl barrows were first identified in Great Britain by John Thurnam (1810–73), an English psychiatrist, archaeologist, and ethnologist.

== British bowl barrows ==
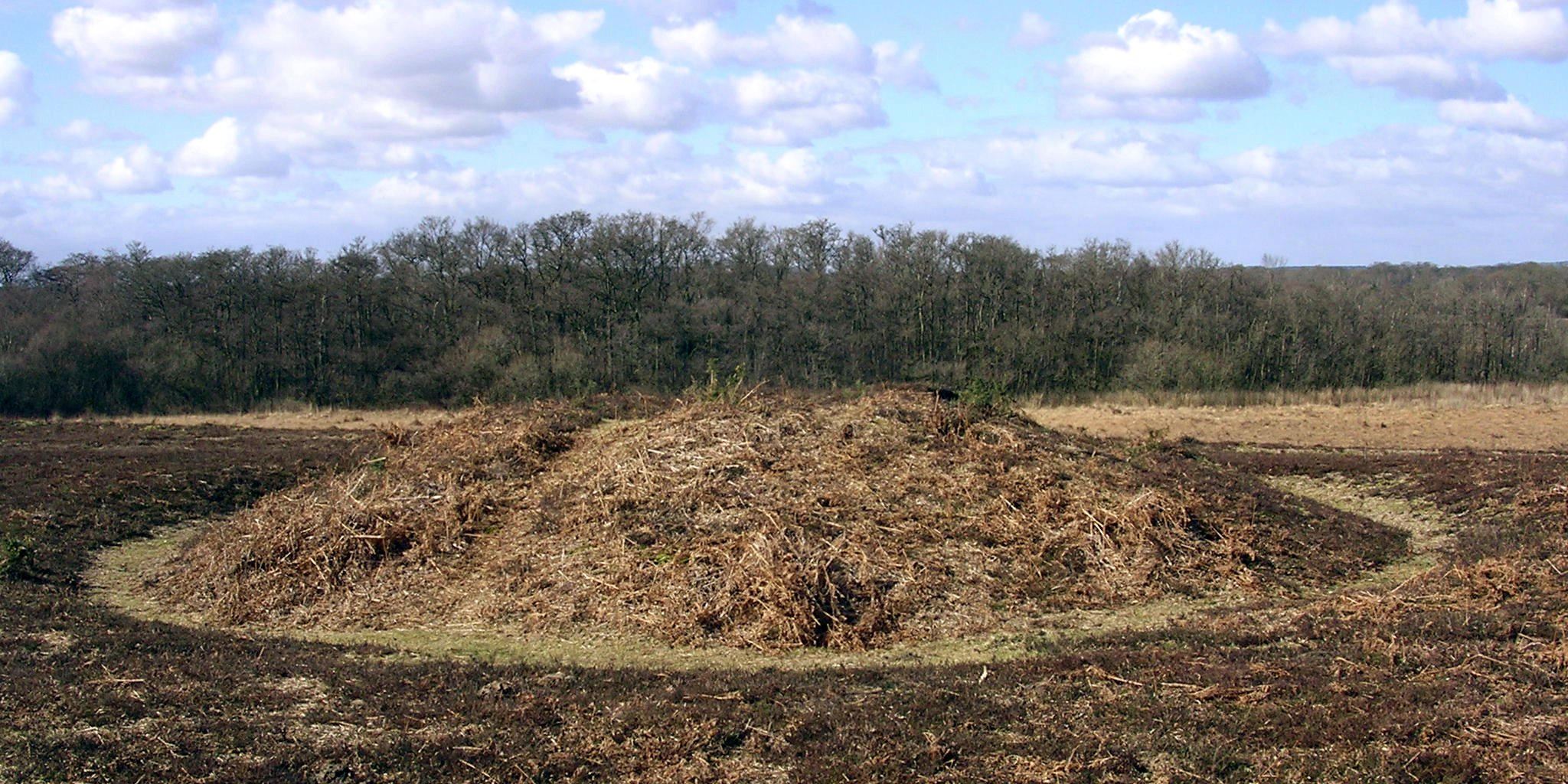
A 15-metre diameter bowl barrow in the New Forest, U.K.

English Heritage proposed the following classification of British bowl barrows:

- Type 1: Kerbless and ditchless barrows
- Type 2: Kerbless with continuous ditch
- Type 3: Kerbless with penannular ditch
- Type 4: Kerbless with segmented ditch
- Type 5: Kerbed but ditchless
- Type 6: Kerbed with continuous ditch
- Type 7: Kerbed with pennanular ditch
- Type 8: Kerbed with segmented ditch
- Type 9: Structured but ditchless
- Type 10: Structured with continuous ditch
- Type 11: Structured with penannular ditch
- Type 12: Structured with segmented ditch

== Tump ==
Tump is Worcestershire dialect term for a small hill, such as a barrow, even a large barrow such as the Whittington Tump in the village of Whittington south east of Worcester, or an "unty tump" meaning mole hill (unty being Worcestershire dialect for a mole). It is related to the Welsh language term Twmpath which was once applied to the mound or village green. From a short list of tumps, it can be seen that the term is used extensively in the Welsh Marches and its use extends beyond that, to Somerset, Wiltshire, Oxfordshire, and Buckinghamshire.

== See also ==
- Devil's Humps, Stoughton
