= Whittington, Worcestershire =

Village in Worcestershire, England

Coordinates: 52.172839°N 2.183318°W

Whittington
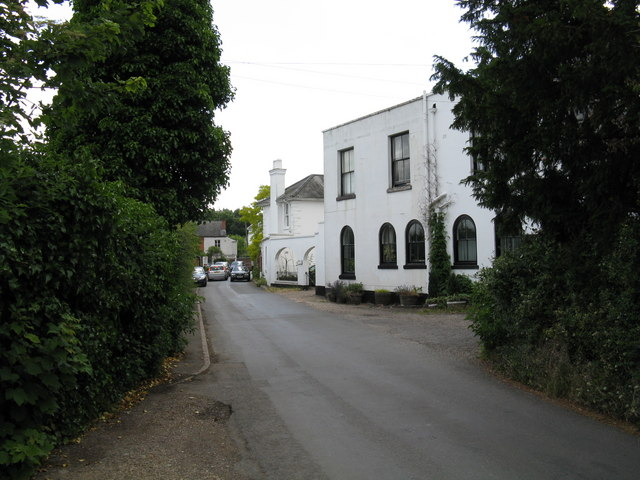
- Whittington village

- Location within Worcestershire
- Population: 1,499 (2021)
- OS grid reference: SO875527
- District: Wychavon
- Shire county: Worcestershire
- Region: West Midlands
- Country: England
- Sovereign state: United Kingdom
- Post town: WORCESTER
- Postcode district: WR5
- Dialling code: 01905
- Police: West Mercia
- Fire: Hereford and Worcester
- Ambulance: West Midlands

Whittington is a village and civil parish near Worcester close to Junction 7 of the M5 motorway, bounded by the motorway and the B4084, in the District of Wychavon. The motorway cuts through the village, with the majority of the village lying on the western side (though some houses remain on the eastern side). The civil parish population was 1,499 at the 2021 census.

== Amenities ==
There is one public house – The Swan, a village and parish church, and an active village hall.

The village has a primary school.

== History ==
The name Whittington derives from the Old English Hwitaingtūn meaning 'settlement connected with Hwita'.

There is an ancient burial mound referred to as Whittington Tump or just "The Tump" across the A44 road from the public house. The tump is thought to have been a barrow, though no burial remains have been found there. It has been claimed that the hill was built at the order of Oliver Cromwell, whereupon his soldiers used their helmets to carry dirt to build the hill in celebration of the victory of the Battle of Worcester in 1651, but evidence for this seems lacking. The setting of this ancient monument was significantly diminished by the building of the M5 motorway a very short distance away, further damage being caused by the widening of the A44, which was rebuilt to bypass the village. It was then damaged again by the building on the north side of the Tump of the road going west to the new crossing of the River Severn south of Worcester.

Tump is Worcestershire dialect for a small hill and may be derived from the Welsh language word "Twmpath". An unty tump is a molehill, unty being local dialect for a mole.

The parish of Whittington also includes the hamlet of Swinesherd, part of which was also lost to the building of the M5 motorway.
