= Red Book of Worcester =

1299 record of the Bishop of Worcester's manors

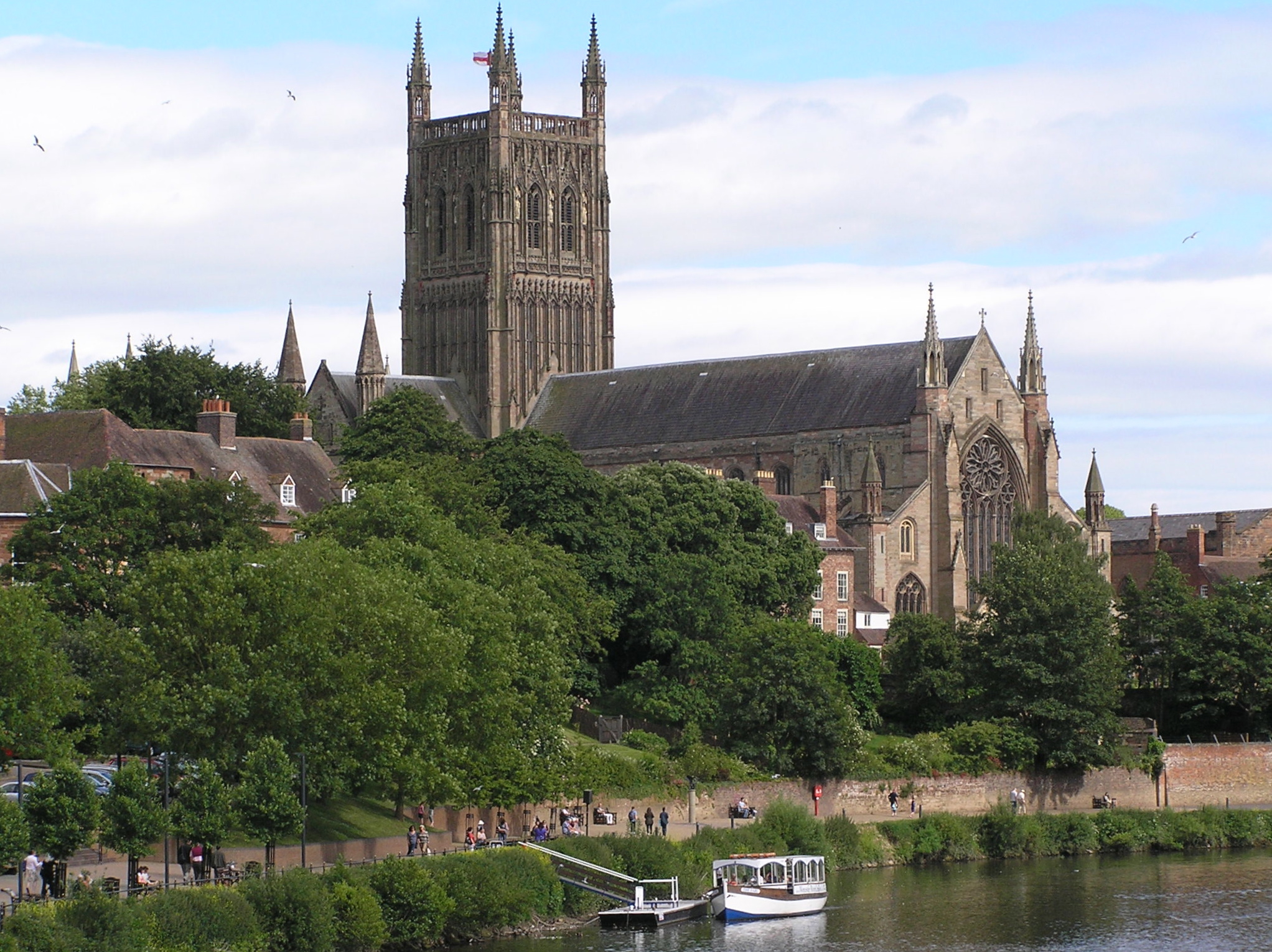
Worcester Cathedral, seat of the bishops of Worcester

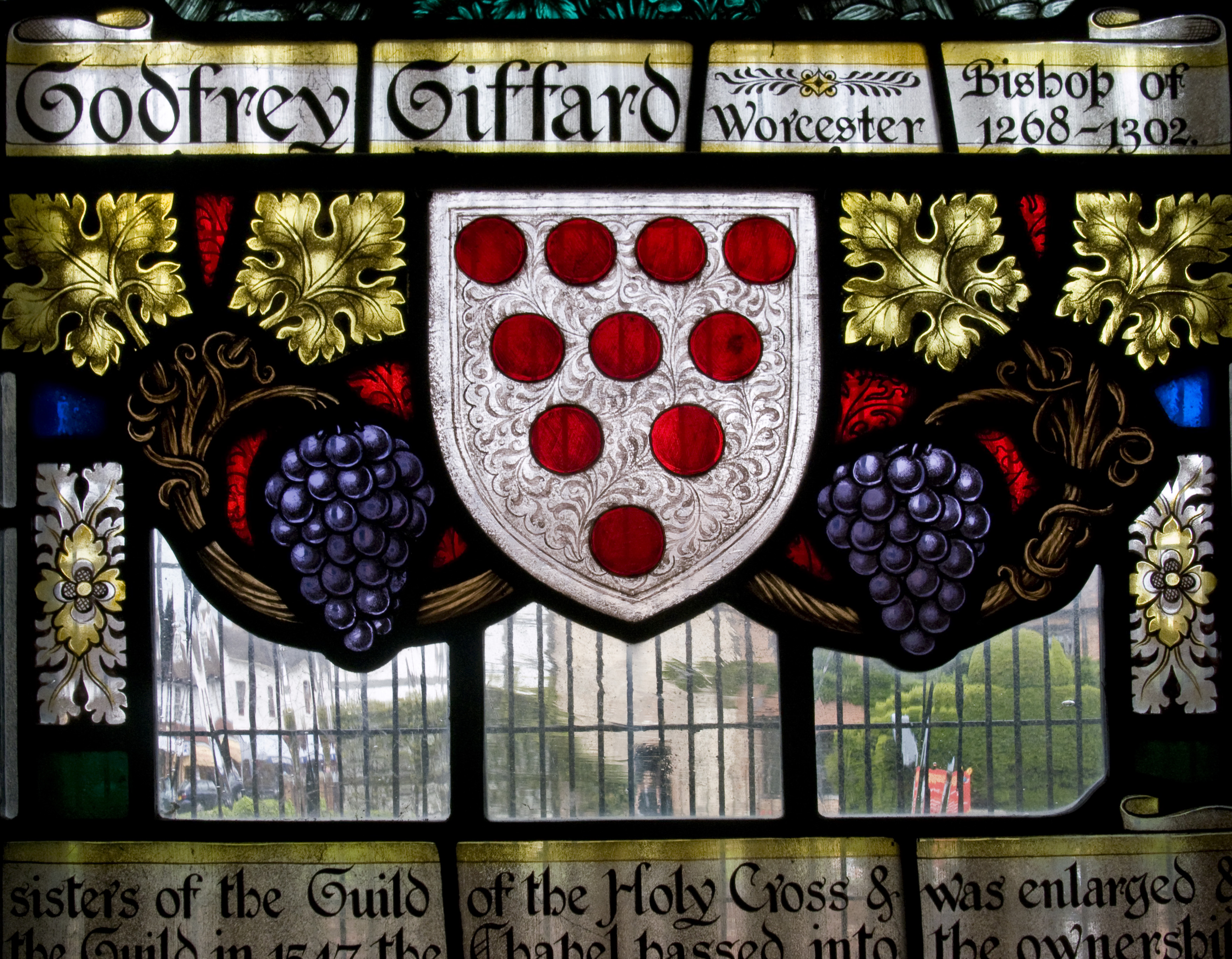
Stained glass window with arms of Godfrey Giffard, who ordered the survey

The Red Book of Worcester is a survey of the Bishop of Worcester's manors made circa 1299. It was ordered by Bishop Godfrey Giffard and incorporated some earlier surveys. The original Latin manuscript has been lost but a transcription was made by antiquary William Thomas before 1738. A modern version based on this transcription has been published since 1934.

== Commissioning ==
The survey was ordered by Godfrey Giffard, the Bishop of Worcester, and completed in 1299. It records details of the diocese's land holdings and was the first major survey of these since the Domesday Book of 1086. The survey provided particularly detailed accounts of four manors in Worcestershire: Kempsey, Bredon, Northwick and Wick. The manor of Hampton also receives some detailed coverage, with the Red Book incorporating an earlier survey of this settlement made in 1182 and a fragmentary survey made circa 1282 as well as a fresh survey. Other manors surveyed include Bradley Green, Welland, Hanbury, Hartlebury and Alvechurch.

== Assessment ==
The original Latin manuscript of the Red Book has been lost but a transcription made by the antiquary William Thomas before 1738 survives. A version based on Thomas' transcription was published by Marjory Hollings of the Worcestershire Historical Society in 1934.

A Doctor of Philosophy thesis by Emma Day in 2011 reviewed the numbers of free tenants and lower classes of peasants (villeins) recorded in the Red Book. Day found that 41% of the peasants in the manors of Kempsey, Bredon, Northwick and Wick noted in the Red Book were free tenants, who generally paid money rents rather than carrying out labour for their lords. This was a significant increase from the situation in Domesday where there were no freemen and only Northwick had recorded having radmen, a similar status to freemen. This was possibly as a result of Giffard's widespread granting of manumission to peasants and granting of leases on freer terms, because of a general surplus of labour at the time.
