= Poulton Chapel =

Chapel in Poulton, Cheshire, England

Coordinates: 53.1191°N 2.8925°W

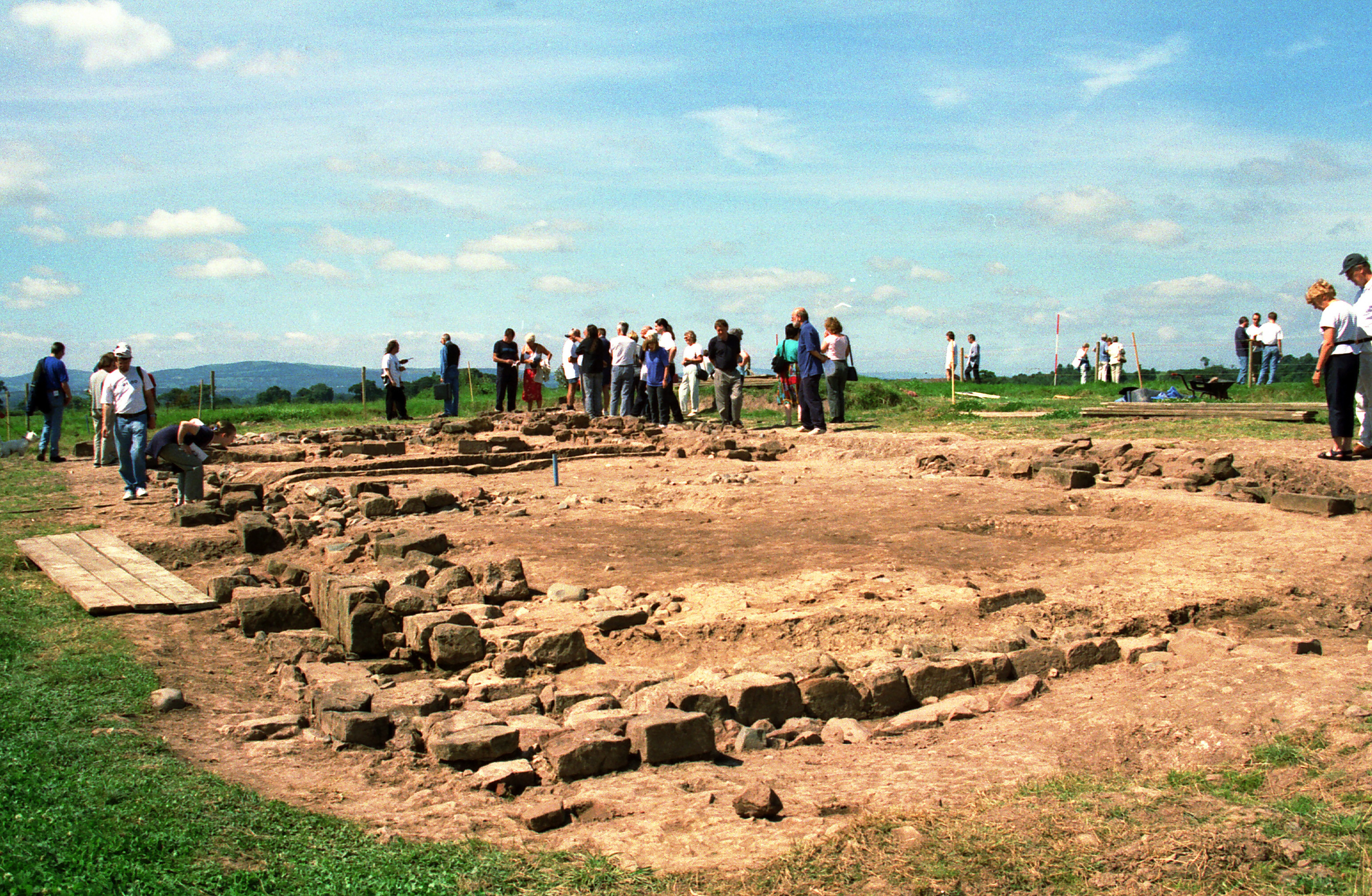
Archaeological dig in 2002

Poulton Chapel was a medieval chapel in the hamlet of Poulton, Cheshire, England (grid reference SJ404584), close to the modern border with Wales. It was built around 1153 by the monks of Poulton Abbey. After the monks moved to Dieulacres between 1199 and 1214 and the abbey was turned into a farming estate for the monks, the chapel served as a one room church for the lay brothers working the land. In the 1487 the chapel was expanded when the estate was leased to the Manley family. During the English Civil War (1642–1651) the chapel was used as a stable and lookout. By 1672 it lay in ruins and by 1718 it was demolished. No above ground structures are extant.

== Foundation and history ==
The earliest ecclesiastical structure on the site is thought to have been a single-cell structure built in the Saxon period, as evidenced by some 170 pieces of Anglo Saxon pottery, specifically 10th century Chester Ware, that have been found in conjunction with the earliest phase of construction.

The later chapel is thought to have been built by the Cistercian monks of Poulton Abbey. According to Janauschek, the abbey itself was founded between 1153 and 1158, but moved to Dieulacres between 1199 and 1214. However, foundation must have occurred by 1153 at the latest as Ranulf de Gernon died in 1153. The exact location of the abbey has yet to be established as no above ground structure remains.

Poulton Abbey was one of three daughter houses (along with Stanlow and Hulton) of Combermere Abbey; founded in 1133 by Hugh Malbank. Abbot William of Combermere founded Poulton Abbey with an endowment of land from Robert Pincerna Le Botiller (1100–1158). Ranulf de Gernon (1099–1153), Earl of Chester and Pincerna's overlord was a prisoner of King Stephen at the time and Pincerna wished prayers to be said for the Earl and his family. On his release the Earl confirmed the foundation and granted the monks a fishery in the River Dee and an exemption for them to grind their corn at his mill in Chester. Numerous other gifts were bestowed on the abbey.

The chapel building appears to have been contemporary with the foundation of the Abbey (c.1153) and comprised a single nave from the earliest phase of building.

After the abbey was moved to Dieulacres by Randle Blundeville, the site remained a grange, or farm estate of the abbey. The chapel appears to have been maintained for the use of the lay brothers who farmed the estate.

In 1487 the abbey leased the estate of Poulton Hall to the prominent Manley family and the chapel was expanded by Sir Nicholas Manley (1468–1506) to include a nave, chancel, and tower for use as his private chapel.

The location of the chapel was recorded on an early estate map of the Grosvenor Estate, thought to have been drawn before 1675. Subsequent estate maps also recorded the chapel and the first Ordnance Survey map also shows the existence of an old chapel.

The chapel was still extant in 1544 when it was granted to Sir George Cotton by the King, although the rest of the buildings had long since fallen into decay. "The king granted to Sir George Cotton...the...chapel of Pulton by Patent dated Dec. 20 1544... 'The remains of the monastery have been long totally destroyed'.

The last recorded use of the chapel was during the English Civil War (1642–1651), when it became a stables and lookout point for Parliamentarian troops. In 1672 it was reported as ruinous and by 1718 it had been demolished.

== Mary of Poulton ==
The chapel was referred to in a sixteenth century document as the Chapel of Mary of Poulton.

Ir ystalm pan oeddem i yn gwilio ynghapel Mair o Bylltyn, ir oedd gwyr wrth gerdd yn kanu kywydde ac odle, a merched yn kanu karole a dyrïe.

Translation:

A long time ago when we kept vigil in the chapel of Mary of Poulton [near Chester], the bardic craftsmen would sing poems and odes and the women would sing carols and dyrïau.

S. Harper cites the above and says: "The suggestion that all of this happened as the people celebrated a vigil, in the main place of worship within the township of Poulton, is important; the setting is evidently not the formal liturgy, but it does taken place in a chapel, likely on the eve of a liturgical feast (perhaps a day when it was customary for professional bards to be paid). The occasion may even have been a pilgrimage to a local shrine or well."

== Archaeological investigation ==
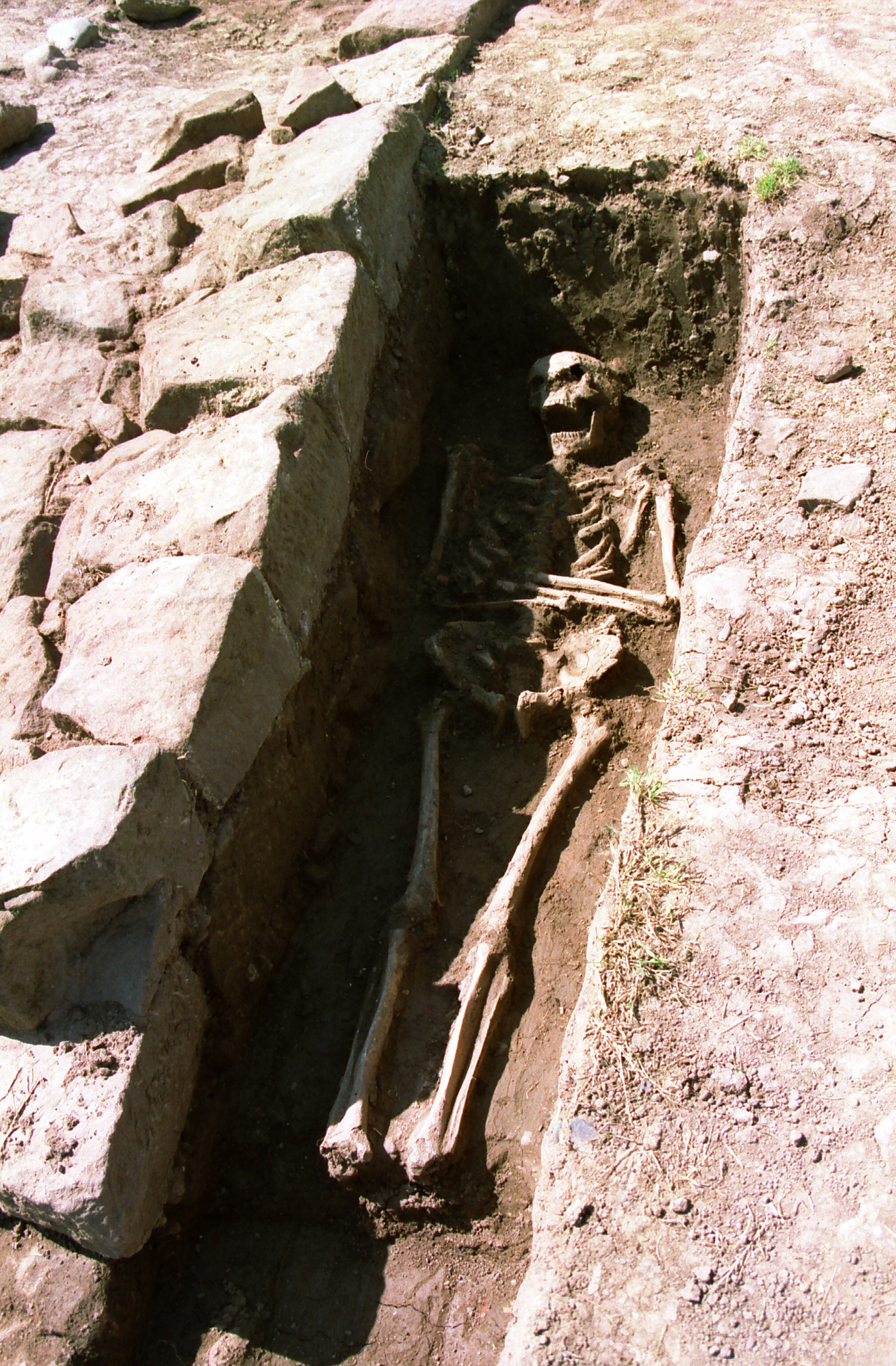
An unearthed grave

The site has been under investigation since 1995, first by a joint venture between Chester Archaeological Services and Liverpool John Moores University, then later by the Poulton Research Project, who have been digging both the immediate chapel environs and a number of other features in the vicinity.

In 2006 the site featured in a Time Team programme called "The Abbey Habit". The weekend dig failed to find any evidence of the location of the abbey, but did establish that an abbey grange, known later as Poulton Hall, was approximately 500 metres from the chapel.

Professor Mick Aston proposed the theory that the chapel was a "Capella ad Portem", or chapel by the gate; a chapel that could be used by the local population who could not access the abbey chapel. Other such chapels exist, such as St. Stephens at Bordesley Abbey in Worcestershire.

The mediaeval graveyard burials are still being uncovered and eight hundred plus burials have so far been excavated (as of 2015).

In addition to the chapel itself, archaeologists have uncovered Roman ditches which have surrendered a wide range of Roman artefacts, suggesting a high status Roman building on the site and linking the Roman presence to the Legio XX Valeria Victrix at Chester.

Furthermore, Iron Age occupation of the site has also been established, with a number of round house ditches having been excavated and a large number of others identified by geophysical survey. Dr Kevin Cootes, site director, believes that the assemblage of animal bone and VCP strongly suggests that the site was being used for meat production, preservation (by salting) and trade.
