= Brindley Water Mill =

Watermill in Staffordshire, England

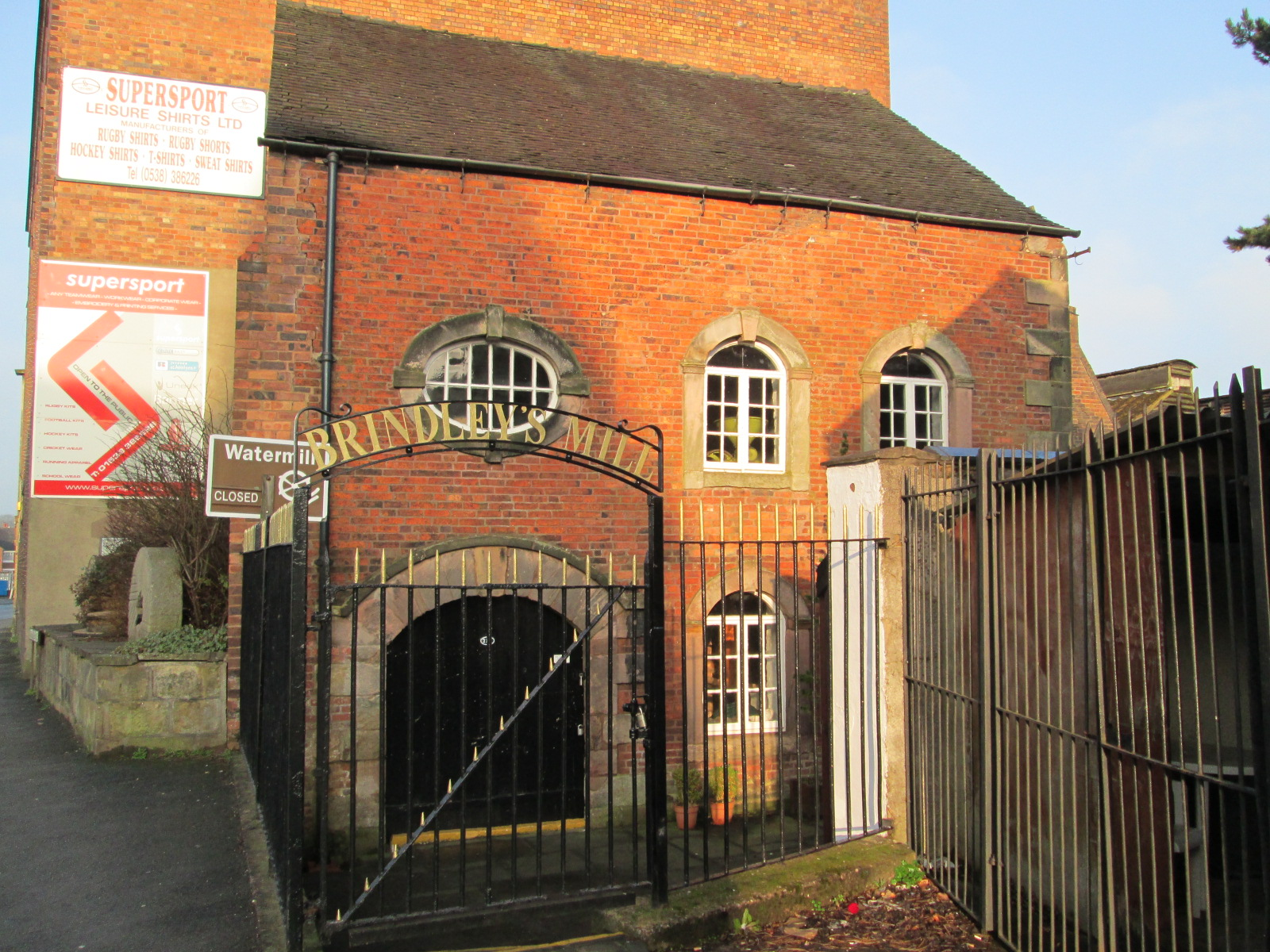
- Interactive map of Brindley Water Mill
- 53°6′35″N 2°2′7″W
- Location: Leek, Staffordshire
- OS grid reference: SJ 97742 56958

History
- Built: 1752

Site notes
- Architect: James Brindley
- Website: www.brindleysmill.co.uk

Scheduled monument
- Designated: 22 October 1968
- Reference no.: 1006101

Listed Building – Grade II
- Designated: 7 June 1972
- Reference no.: 1268579

The Brindley Water Mill is a water mill in the town of Leek, Staffordshire, England, built in 1752 by James Brindley. It was restored to working order in the 1970s, and is now a museum. It is a Scheduled Monument and a Grade II Listed Building.

== History ==
There was a water mill in Leek by the mid-12th century, owned at that time by Ranulf de Gernon, 4th Earl of Chester. His grandson Ranulf de Blondeville, 6th Earl of Chester in the early 1220s gave the mill to Dieulacres Abbey. At the time of the Dissolution of the Monasteries in 1536–41, the abbey had two water mills in Leek, one of which was on the River Churnet in Mill Street.

In the early 1750s James Brindley, who had set up as a millwright in Mill Street in 1742 after completing his apprenticeship in Macclesfield, was asked to rebuild the corn mill in Leek. The new mill was probably on or near the former site, and involved constructing a mill race and a weir. A stone set into the west wall of the building shows the date 1752.

The mill in the 19th century was part of the estate in Leek of the Earl of Macclesfield, and later was owned by the neighbouring textile mill owners. It remained in use as a corn mill until 1940. About a third of it was demolished in 1948 when the adjacent A523 road was widened, and a brick gable wall was built on the south side, where there had been a partition wall.

=== Restoration ===
Dr Cyril Boucher, an expert on early engineers, studied the mill in detail in the 1960s, and in 1968 described it in his biography of Brindley. In that year it was listed as a Scheduled Monument. The Brindley Mill Preservation Trust was established and registered as a charity in 1970, its aim being to purchase and restore the mill. The freehold was acquired in 1972. The structure, machinery and waterways were restored, and on 4 May 1974 the mill was officially opened to the public. In 1980 the James Brindley Museum was opened in the building.

== Description ==
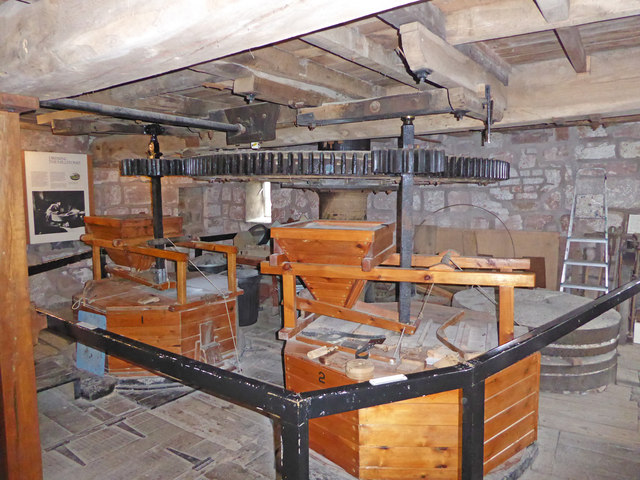
The pit wheel and grinding stones

The building measures 28 feet (8.5 m) north to south and 27 feet (8.2 m) west to east. The front, facing east, has on the left (in the centre before the 1948 demolition) a wide entrance with a segmental arch, and a circular window above; to the right, there are two arched windows on each floor. There is an undershot waterwheel, diameter 16 feet (4.9 m), on the north side of the building; near to it are the weir, millpond, leats and sluice gates whereby water is directed away from the river.

Inside, the floors, bearing the grinding stones and machinery, are supported by large oak beams. The roof rafters are supported by a king post structure resting on a curved tie beam. The waterwheel operates two sets of stones, via an internal pit wheel.

== See also ==
- Listed buildings in Leek, Staffordshire
