= Westwood Hall =

Building in Leek, Staffordshire, England

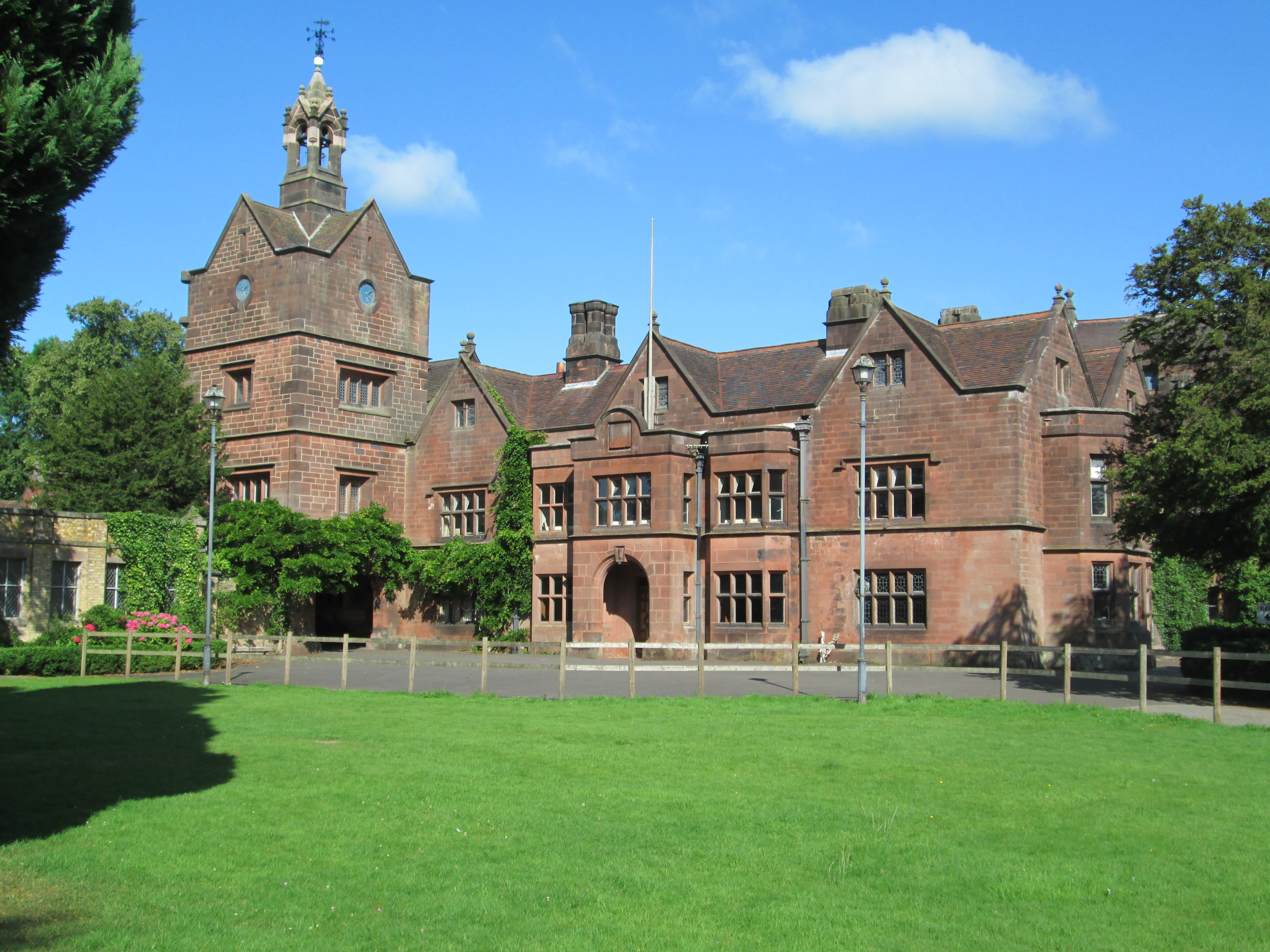
- Interactive map of Westwood Hall

General information
- Status: Grade II listed
- Architectural style: Jacobean
- Location: Leek, Staffordshire grid reference SJ 966 563
- Coordinates: 53°6′13″N 2°3′7″W
- Completed: 1853

Westwood Hall is a former stately home in Leek, Staffordshire, England.

It is a Grade II listed building. It has been a school since 1921, and is now Westwood College.

== Description ==
The house, extended from an existing building, was created from 1850 to 1853 by the architects Hadfield Weightman and Goldie (the partnership of Matthew Ellison Hadfield, John Grey Weightman and George Goldie). It is of red sandstone, and is in Jacobean style. There is a clock tower west of the south front, and a great hall behind the tower.

== History ==
There was a farm at Westwood in the 1600s; by the early 18th century it was the property of William Joliffe of Caverswall Castle. It passed on his death in 1709 to his daughter Lucy, wife of William Vane, 1st Viscount Vane. In 1759 their son William Vane, 2nd Viscount Vane sold it to Mary Countess of Stamford; it was inherited by her son, the politician Booth Grey and then by his son Booth Grey, also a politician.

=== John Davenport ===
In 1813 the younger Booth Grey sold the estate to the industrialist John Davenport, founder of Davenport Pottery. He enlarged the building, employing the architect James Elmes; the resulting house had an Elizabethan style. John Davenport died in 1848, and his heir, also John Davenport, made further modifications. Employing architects Hadfield Weightman and Goldie, the house was extended, the work being carried out from 1850 to 1853.

=== John Robinson ===
The younger John Davenport sold Westwood Hall in 1868 to John Robinson, a locomotive engineer. After the death of Robinson's widow Helen in 1908, it was the home of H. J. Johnson; he sold it in 1920 to Staffordshire County Council, and in 1921 it was opened as a girls' school. In 1965, merging with a newly built school nearby on Westwood Park Avenue, it became the mixed comprehensive Westwood County High School. In 1980 it became a 14–18 comprehensive High School.

== Lodge ==
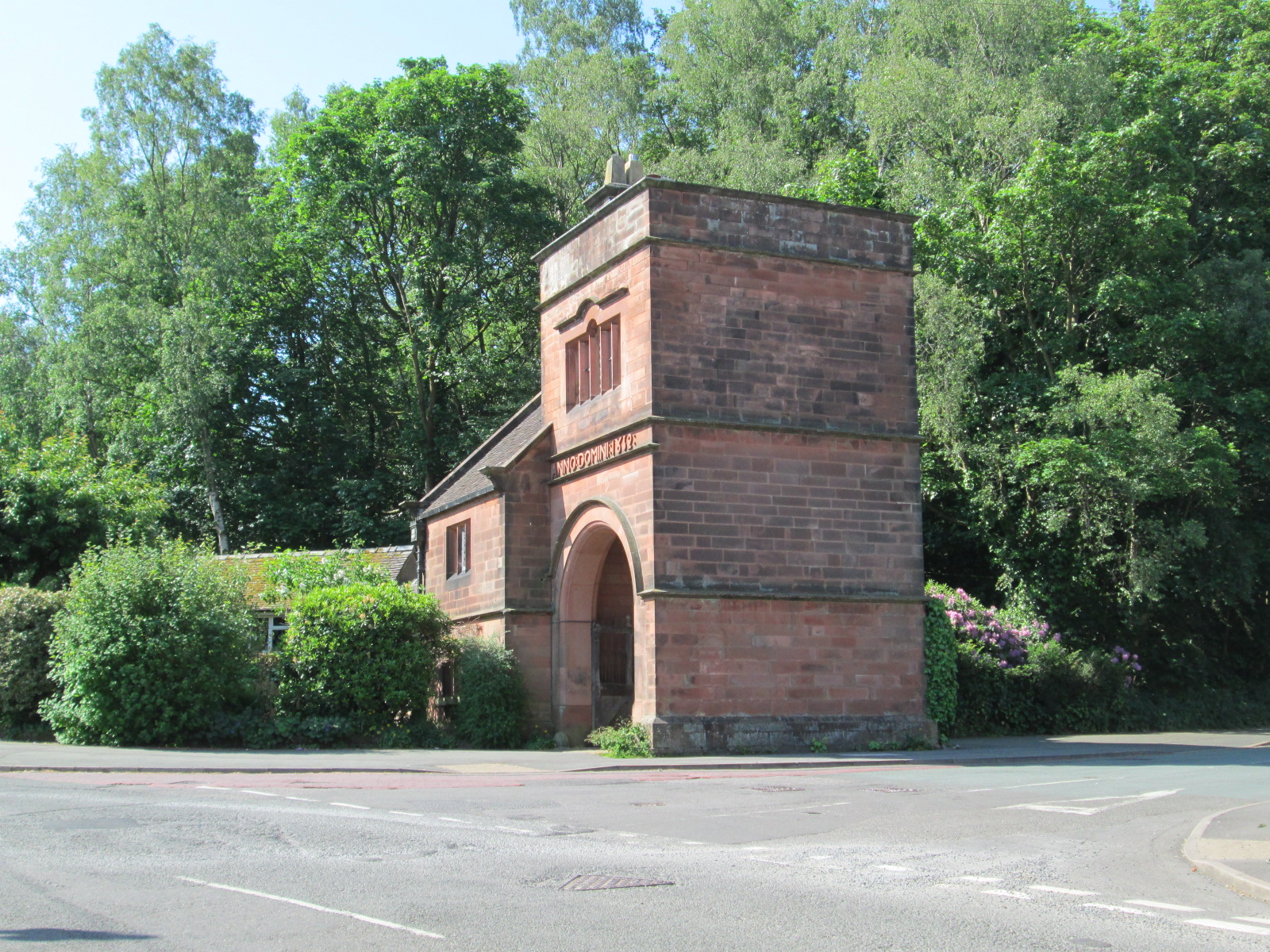
The lodge on Westwood Park Drive

The former lodge on the eastern approach to Westwood Hall is on Westwood Park Drive, grid reference SJ 971 563. It is a Grade II listed building, and is presumed to be by the architects of the hall, Hadfield Weightman and Goldie. It is of red sandstone. Above the archway over the former driveway to the hall, in low relief, is the date: "ANNO DOMINI 1852".

== See also ==
- Listed buildings in Leek, Staffordshire
