= Abbey Green, Staffordshire Moorlands =

Village in Staffordshire, England

Coordinates: 53.1192°N 2.0321°W

Abbey Green
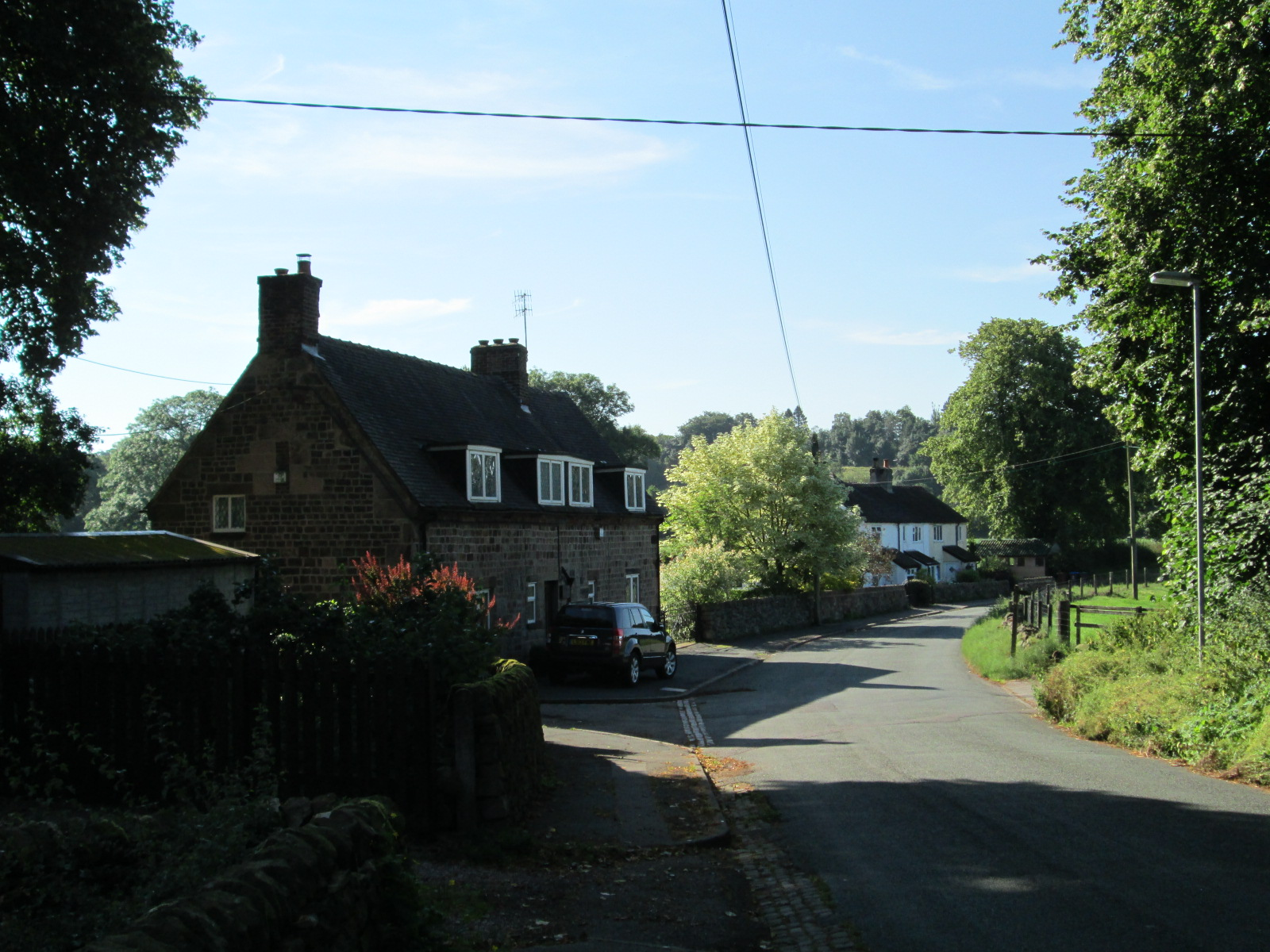
- The road through the village

- Location within Staffordshire
- OS grid reference: SJ979578
- Civil parish: Leek
- District: Staffordshire Moorlands
- Shire county: Staffordshire
- Region: West Midlands
- Country: England
- Sovereign state: United Kingdom
- Post town: LEEK
- Postcode district: ST13
- Dialling code: 01538
- Police: Staffordshire
- Fire: Staffordshire
- Ambulance: West Midlands
- UK Parliament: Staffordshire Moorlands

Abbey Green is a small village in the civil parish of Leek, in the Staffordshire Moorlands district of Staffordshire, England. It is close to the market town of Leek.

== History ==
The village is close to the site of Dieulacres Abbey. The abbey was founded in 1214 by Ranulph de Blondeville, 6th Earl of Chester for Cistercian monks, who moved from Poulton, Cheshire because of attacks from the Welsh. The Earl gave the monks the manor of nearby Leek, where a Wednesday market had recently been established. The abbey remained in existence until the Dissolution of the Monasteries, when it was surrendered in 1538.

There are some scanty remains of the abbey, which are Grade II listed. Much of the material was used for the building erected on the site.

The building on the site of the abbey, built by 1614, was the home of Thomas Rudyard, lord of the manor of Leek, and later of his descendants. It was once known as Abbey Dieulacres, and later as Dieulacres Abbey Farm. It is now known as Abbey Farm.

== Amenities ==
The Abbey Inn, a feature of the village, is a Grade II* listed building and is dated 1702.
