= John Robinson (engineer) =

British locomotive engineer

John Robinson (27 March 1823, Skipton – 9 July 1902, Westwood Hall, Leek, Staffordshire) was a British locomotive engineer.

He was apprenticed in 1839 to Sharp, Roberts and Co, and in 1843 he became a partner. He became vice-chairman and co-managing director, with the chairman, C. P. Stewart. Upon Stewart's death in 1882, Robinson became chairman, which position he retained until his retirement in 1890, the year after the company moved to Glasgow. He was a member of the Institution of Mechanical Engineers from 9 April 1872, a member of council from 1866, a vice-president from 1870. He was elected president in 1878, and in 1879.

He was a justice of the peace for Staffordshire, and was High Sheriff of Staffordshire for 1882.

== Family ==
He married Helen Lees, (c 1827 - 1908) in 1848; they had children:

- Emily Lees Robinson (22 May 1849 - 1900)
- Rev. Arthur Edward Robinson (1851 - )
- John Frederick Robinson (24 May 1853 -)
- Helen Susan Robinson (1855 - )
- Herbert M. Robinson (1859 - )
- Edith Marianne Robinson (1860 - 1876)

Professional and academic associations
Preceded by Thomas Hawksley	President of the Institution of Mechanical Engineers; 1878-1879	Succeeded by Edward Alfred Cowper
