= Listed buildings in Leek, Staffordshire =

Leek is a civil parish in the district of Staffordshire Moorlands, Staffordshire, England. It contains 144 listed buildings that are recorded in the National Heritage List for England. Of these, one is listed at Grade I, the highest of the three grades, five are at Grade II*, the middle grade, and the others are at Grade II, the lowest grade. The parish contains the town of Leek and the surrounding area. An ancient market town, it became industrial in the late 18th century mainly with the weaving, spinning and dyeing of silk. During the 19th century many of the more notable buildings were designed by the architects William Sugden and his son William Larner Sugden. Many of the listed buildings in the town are centred around St Edward's Church, in Church Street, St Edward Street, and Market Place.

Most of the listed buildings in the town are houses and associated structures, offices, public houses and hotels, shops, mills, and public buildings, and outside the town they are farmhouses and farm buildings. The oldest listed buildings are ancient crosses in the churchyard and Market Place, the ruins of Dieu-la-Cres Abbey, and St Edward's Church itself. The Leek Arm of the Caldon Canal runs through the parish, and the listed buildings associated with it are a bridge, an aqueduct, and a tunnel entrance. Included among the other listed buildings are a plague stone, items in St Edward's churchyard, almshouses, other churches, bridges, a railway signal box, mileposts, a milestone and a series of boundary stones, a drinking fountain, public conveniences, cemetery chapels and gates, a bank, war memorials, and a telephone kiosk.

== Key ==
Grade	Criteria
I	Buildings of exceptional interest, sometimes considered to be internationally important
II*	Particularly important buildings of more than special interest
II	Buildings of national importance and special interest

== Buildings ==
Name and location	Photograph	Date	Notes	Grade
Cross south of St Edward's Church; 53.10677°N 2.02651°W		11th century	The cross is in the churchyard just south of the church. It is in stone, it consists of a square shaft, possibly reassembled from fragments, and has interlace decoration in panels. The cross is also a scheduled monument.	II
Cross southeast of St Edward's Church; 53.10685°N 2.02609°W		11th century	The cross is in the churchyard to the southeast of the church. It is in stone, over 10 feet (3.0 m) high, and has a waistband. On the waistband and above is interlace decoration. The cross is also a scheduled monument.	II
Dieu-la-Cres Abbey ruins 53.11817°N 2.02644°W	—	13th century	The remains of the abbey are in stone and consist of the clustered shaft bases of three piers, and a length of wall. The ruins are also a scheduled monument.	II
St Edward's Church; 53.10685°N 2.02659°W		Late 13th century (possible)	Most of the church dates from the 15th and 16th centuries, and it was restored twice in the 19th century, first by Ewan Christian, and later, in 1865–67, by G. E. Street, who also extended the chancel. It is built in stone, with roofs of lead and slate, and consists of a nave with a clerestory, north and south aisles, north and south porches, a chancel with a south vestry, and a west tower. The tower has a 14th-century west door, the upper parts ore in Perpendicular style, and it has two stages, clasping buttresses, a clock face in the south front, a lozenge frieze, and an embattled parapet with corbels and crocketed pinnacles.	II*
Remains of cross at SJ 988 532; 53.07676°N 2.01972°W	—	14th century (possible)	The cross fragment, which stands by a road junction, is in sandstone, and consists of a small stump, originally part of the shaft.	II
Plague Stone at NGR; SJ 986 551; 53.09399°N 2.02202°W		Late 14th century (possible)	The fragment of a cross shaft on the west side of the A520 road, it is in stone, and consists of a fluted shaft about 1.25 metres (4 ft 1 in) high. It is probably not in its original site.	II
Market Cross; 53.10608°N 2.02555°W		Early 15th century (probable)	The cross stands in Market Place, and has a fluted shaft on a stepped base, on a later quadrant base. At the top is a Maltese cross head on a small scalloped base. The cross is also a scheduled monument.	II
2, 3 and 4 Clerk Bank; 53.10674°N 2.02745°W		15th or 16th century	A row of three cottages with cruck construction that were later extended and refaced. The external walls of No. 2 are in brick, Nos. 3 and 4 have sandstone walls, and the roofs are tiled. No. 2 has two storeys and casement windows. Nos. 3 and 4 have two storeys and attics, and each has a gabled dormer.	II
Edge End Farmhouse; 53.11707°N 1.99884°W	—	16th century (possible)	The farmhouse is originally of cruck construction, and was remodelled in the 19th century. The lower walls are in stone, with brick above, and a tile roof. There are two storeys, three bays, a single-storey wing to the right, and a later rear wing. The doorway has an architrave, to its left is a mullioned window, to the right is a casement window, and there are three gabled dormers. Inside, one cruck frame has survived intact.	II
Dieu-la-Cres Abbey Farmhouse; 53.11769°N 2.02802°W		1612	The farmhouse, which includes material from Dieu-la-Cres Abbey, was extended and remodelled in the 19th century. The lower storey is in stone, the upper parts are timber-framed, with some timber framing applied to brick, and the roof is slated. There are two storeys, a main range, and a gabled cross-wing on the left. On the front is a two-storey gabled porch; the upper storey of the cross-wing and porch are jettied. The porch contains a four-centred arched entrance and a moulded bressumer above. In the cross-wing is a canted bay window, and in the main range is a stair window, and other windows, some casements, other mullioned. Adjoining the house is an arched gateway dated 1627 with a four-centred arch and incorporating decorative features from the former abbey.	II
2, 2A and 4 Church Street; 53.10677°N 2.02550°W		Early 17th century (probable)	A row of houses, later shops, with a timber-framed core, external walls of stone, and a tile roof. There are two storeys and four bays. In the ground floor is a chamfered archway, a doorway with a chamfered stone architrave and lintel, and shop fronts. The upper floor contains a casement window to the left, and three mullioned windows to the right.	II
1 and 3 Stockwell Street; 53.10677°N 2.02499°W		Early 17th century (probable)	A house, later two shops with living accommodation, the building has been modified, including the addition of attics and a gambrel roof. It is in stone with a blue tile roof, two storeys and attics. In the ground floor are shop fronts, the upper floor contains chamfered casement windows, and in the attic are three pedimented dormers.	II
Haregate Hall; 53.11697°N 2.00947°W	—	Early 17th century (probable)	The house was extended in about 1772, and altered in the 19th century. It is in partly in stone, and partly in brick, and has roofs of tile and Welsh slate. The southwest wing is the oldest part, it is in stone, and has one storey and an attic. The later southeast wing is in red brick with blue brick headers, and has two storeys and an attic, and at the rear is a 19th-century wing. The windows are mullioned or mullioned and transomed, and in the south gable end is a sundial.	II
Former Swan Hotel, 2 St Edward Street; 53.10656°N 2.02717°W		Early 17th century (probable)	The public house is on a corner site, and was extended in the 19th century. The original part has a timber-framed core, and is rendered with applied timber framing, and it has a tile roof. There are two storeys, and the main part consists of a hall and cross-wing. On the front is a doorway flanked by bay windows. To the right is a single-storey extension with a basement, extending for four bays along Overton Bank. The windows in both parts are sashes.	II
Roebuck Inn, Derby Street; 53.10567°N 2.02401°W		1626	A house, later a public house, it is timber-framed with a Welsh slate roof. There are two storeys and three gabled bays, the left bay smaller, projecting and lower, and a later rear wing in sandstone. Above the doorway is a fanlight, most of the windows are casements, and in the left bay is a five-light mullioned and transomed window. The gables are jettied and have bargeboards and finials.	II
Home Farmhouse, Mount Road; 53.09586°N 2.00792°W	—	1628	The farmhouse has a timber-framed core, external walls of sandstone, partly rendered, and a tile roof. There are two storeys and an attic, and a T-shaped plan, with a main range and a cross-wing. The date is on a lintel above a blocked doorway, and the windows are mullioned.	II
Lych gate, wall, railings, gate piers and gates, St Edward's Church; 53.10671°N 2.02658°W		1634	The oldest part is the lych gate, which is in stone, and consists of a segmental arch with a stepped parapet and pinnacles. Th churchyard wall has been rebuilt on occasions, it is in stone with moulded copings, and has cast-iron railings. In the south wall is the polished granite basin of a fountain, and a sandstone drinking trough. At the east end is a pair of stone piers with a square section and pyramidal caps, and the gates are in cast iron.	II
8, 10 and 12 Sheep Market; 53.10611°N 2.02617°W		17th century (probable)	A row of three shops that were refronted in the 19th century. They have a timber-framed and sandstone core, with rendered refacing, and roofs of Welsh slate and tile with coped gables. There are three storeys, and each shop has one gabled bay. In the ground floor are shop fronts, and the upper floors contain windows, most of which are sashes.	II
Fowlchurch Farmhouse; 53.11322°N 2.01941°W	—	17th century	The farmhouse, later a private house, was remodelled at the front in the 19th century. It is in sandstone with a scallop-tile roof. There are two storeys and three bays. At the rear is a porch and three-light chamfered mullioned windows. On the front are angle quoins, a doorway with a chamfered architrave, and three-light casement windows in chamfered architraves.	II
The Red Lion Hotel, Market Place; 53.10629°N 2.02511°W		17th century	A private house, later a public house, it was extended and remodelled in the 18th century. There are three storeys and three bays, and a parallel rear range. The doorway has a moulded architrave, an entablature on console brackets, and a cast-iron and glass canopy. The doorway is flanked by full-height canted bay windows containing mullioned windows. To the right is a courtyard entry, over which are mullioned and transomed windows.	II
Greystones, 23 Stockwell Street; 53.10706°N 2.02373°W		Late 17th century	A stone house with a string course and a moulded eaves cornice, it has a tile roof with coped gables. There are two storeys and an attic, and a symmetrical front of three bays. The central doorway has side-lights and an apsidal hood. The windows are mullioned and transomed with three lights, there are three gabled dormers, and in the gable apex is a bull's eye window.	II*
Boundary wall, Friends Meeting House; 53.10631°N 2.02871°W	—	Late 17th century	The wall is in stone and brick, and encloses the grounds of the meeting hall. The outer wall is in dry stone with rough copings, the inner wall is in stone, and at the rear is a wall in stone and brick.	II
Wall Grange Farmhouse; 53.09241°N 2.03410°W	—	Late 17th century	The farmhouse is in stone, with a string course, a moulded cornice, overhanging eaves, and a tile roof. There are two storeys and an attic, and an almost square plan, with fronts of five and four bays. The doorway is in the centre, the windows are mullioned and transomed, some are blind, and there are two dormers.	II
Ash Almshouses, wall and railings, Broad Street; 53.10408°N 2.02591°W		1676	The almshouses, which were restored in 1881, are in rendered stone with tile roofs. They have one storey and attics, with seven bays along Broad Street, and two on Compton. The doorways are paired and have segmental heads, and the windows have round heads, those in the attic in gabled dormers. The gables are coped, and have moulded kneelers and ball finials. In front of the almshouses are retaining walls with iron railings, incorporating a milestone.	II
Friends Meeting House, Overton Bank; 53.10623°N 2.02845°W		1697	The meeting house is stone with a moulded string course and a tile roof with coped gables. There are two storeys and an L-shaped plan. with a main block of three bays. Most of the windows and doorways are blocked.	II
Abbey Inn; 53.11728°N 2.03224°W		1702	A house, later a public house, it is in sandstone with some replacement in brick, and it has a Welsh slate roof with coped gables and moulded kneelers. There are two storeys and an attic, and a front of three bays. The central doorway has a massive lintel containing a circular light, the date and initials. The windows are casements with chamfered mullions, above the ground floor windows and doorway is a hood mould stepped over the doorway, and in the attic are three dormers with coped gablets.	II*
St Edward's Vicarage; 53.10688°N 2.02574°W		1714	The vicarage, which was later extended, is in stone with a tile roof. There are two storeys and an attic, a main range of three bays, a projecting two-bay gabled wing to the right, and a later rear wing. The windows have moulded stone architraves containing sashes, the upper lights with Gothic arched glazing. In the rear wing is an oriel window.	II
Former Grammar School; 53.10688°N 2.02824°W		1723	The former grammar school is in stone with a moulded eaves cornice, and a tile roof with coped gables and moulded kneelers. There are two storeys and three bays. The central doorway has a heavy lintel, above it is an inscribed stone, and the three-light windows have chamfered mullions and lattice glazing.	II
62 St Edward Street; 53.10468°N 2.02642°W		1724	This consists of two houses, later offices, the earlier in stone, the later to the left refronted in brick, both with tile roofs. The older part has floor bands, a moulded eaves cornice, two storeys and an attic, and two bays. In the centre is a doorway with a gilded monogram above, both with moulded surrounds. To the left is a canted bay window, the other windows are mullioned and transomed, and there are two gabled dormers. The house to the left is narrower, with a parapet, three storeys and two bays. The doorway to the left has a part-segmental head, and the windows are sashes.	II
15 Derby Street; 53.10586°N 2.02435°W	—	Early 18th century	A house on a corner site, later a shop, with a possible earlier core, it was later refronted and remodelled. It is in red brick with blue brick headers on the left return, and has a slate roof with a coped gable and kneelers. There are three storeys, and a gabled front of two bays. In the ground floor is a modern shop front, and above are mullioned and transomed windows in the middle floor, and sash windows in the top floor, all with lintels grooved as voussoirs. In the left return is a doorway with a reeded surround, a stair window above it, a sash window, and a mullioned and transomed window.	II
23 and 25 Derby Street; 53.10581°N 2.02367°W		Early 18th century	A house, later a shop, it incorporates material from a 16th or 17th-century building at the rear. The main part is in brick with stone dressings, quoins on the left, and a dentilled eaves cornice, the rear part is in stone, and the roof is tiled with coped gables and moulded kneelers. At the front are three storeys and two bays, and there is a parallel rear range with two storeys. The front contains a projecting shop front, and in the upper floors are casement windows. In the rear range is a casement window and a chamfered mullioned window.	II
12 Market Place; 53.10590°N 2.02521°W	—	Early 18th century (possible)	A house, later a shop, it was altered and refaced in the 19th century. The shop is in stuccoed brick, with a moulded eaves cornice, and a tile roof. There are three storeys, a front of two bays, and a curved corner on to Derby Street. In the ground floor is a 20th-century shop front, and the upper floors contain sash windows.	II
16 Market Place; 53.10593°N 2.02588°W	—	Early 18th century	A house, later a shop, it is in red brick with blue brick headers, and a tile roof with a coped gable on a moulded kneeler on the right. There are three storeys and seven bays. The central doorway has a fanlight and a canopy hood on scrolled brackets. To the left is an inserted shop front, and the windows have iron frames, small panes, and opening lights.	II
23 Market Place; 53.10644°N 2.02560°W		Early 18th century (probable)	A house, later a shop, it was later extended and remodelled. It is in brick with a moulded eaves cornice, and a tile roof with coped gables on moulded kneelers. There are three storeys, two bays, and a later parallel rear range. In the ground floor is a shop front with panelled pilasters, a panelled fascia on moulded console brackets, and a recessed entrance. The upper floors contain sash windows with flat lintels.	II
24 Market Place; 53.10645°N 2.02564°W		Early 18th century	A house, later a shop with living accommodation, it is in painted stone, with a string course, a moulded eaves cornice, and a tile roof with coped gables on moulded kneelers. There are three storeys and two bays. In the ground floor is a shop front, and the upper floors contain three-light windows with chamfered mullions.	II
69 and 71 St Edward Street; 53.10456°N 2.02584°W	—	Early 18th century (probable)	A pair of houses that were refronted in the 19th century. They are in rendered brick with dentilled eaves and tile roofs. Each house has three storeys and one bay, and No. 69 on the left is taller. In the ground floor of No. 69 is a canted bay window and a doorway to the right, all flanked by pilasters. In the middle floor is a wide window, and the top floor contains a sash window. No. 71 has a central doorway flanked by windows, and in the upper floors are casement windows.	II
Conservative Working Men's Club, Mill Street; 53.10456°N 2.02584°W		Early 18th century	An inn, later used for other purposes, it is in stone with moulded string courses and a tile roof. There are three storeys and four bays. The central doorway has a moulded architrave and a pedimented hood on brackets, and the windows are chamfered with mullioned.	II
Ford House, Market Street; 53.10686°N 2.02321°W		Early 18th century	The house was remodelled and extended in the 19th century. It is in stone with sill bands and a stone-flagged roof. There are three storeys, a front of three bays, and a later rear wing and parallel service range. The central doorway has a moulded architrave with a triglyph frieze. and it is flanked by bow windows with reeded architraves. The upper floor contains sash windows, the windows above the doorway with an entablature on brackets. In the left return is a full-height mullioned and transomed stair window.	II
Garden wall, Ford House; 53.10669°N 2.02342°W	—	Early 18th century (possible)	The wall that encloses the garden was later raised in height. It is in stone and brick, the part along Market street has stone in the lower part, and brick in the upper part divided into panels by pilasters.	II
64 St Edward Street; 53.10457°N 2.02636°W		1747	A brick house on a stone plinth with angle quoins, a moulded eaves cornice and a slate roof with coped gables. There are three storeys and six bays, the left bay narrower. The central doorway has a fanlight and a pediment on console brackets, and there is a narrower doorway to the left. The windows are sashes with lintels grooved as voussoirs, and keystones.	II
21 and 22 Market Place; 53.10634°N 2.02573°W	—	Mid-18th century	A pair of houses, later shops with living accommodation, they are in brick with stone dressings, angle quoins, a string course, a moulded eaves cornice, and a tile roof. There are three storeys, six bays, and a parallel rear range. In the ground floor are shop fronts, a passage entry to the left, and a cellar entry to the right, and above these is a dentilled fascia on consoles. The upper floors contain sash windows, and in the rear range is a bay window.	II
5 and 7 Sheep Market; 53.10598°N 2.02608°W		Mid-18th century	A pair of houses, later a shop, it is in red brick with blue brick headers and a tile roof. There are two storeys and an attic, and five bays. The ground floor contains a 19th-century shop front that has a recessed central entrance, reeded pilasters, and fluted cast-iron columns, and to the right is a round-arched passage entry. In the upper floor are sash windows, and there are two dormers.	II
47 St Edward Street; 53.10498°N 2.02616°W	—	18th century	A house that was restored in the 19th century and used for other purposes. It is in brick with an eaves cornice, a Welsh slate roof, three storeys, and five bays. Stone steps lead up to a central doorway that has an Ionic doorcase with a segmental-arched fanlight, a channelled frieze, a swagged cornice, and a pediment. The doorway is flanked by canted bay windows, the window above the doorway has a reeded entablature on brackets, and the other windows are sashes.	II
54 St Edward Street; 53.10497°N 2.02664°W		Mid-18th century	A house, later offices, with rear extensions in the late 19th century. It is in red brick with a moulded stone eaves cornice and a slate roof with coped gables. The front range has three storeys and five bays, and the rear extensions are varied and arranged around a courtyard. On the front, steps lead up to a central doorway with a pediment on scrolled brackets, and the windows are sashes with keystones.	II
Broad's Bridge; 53.11210°N 2.03259°W		18th century	The bridge carries Abbey Green Road over the River Churnet. It is in stone, and consists of a single shallow segmental arch with a concave plan. The bridge has a moulded string course, and a parapet with flat projecting copings and square end piers.	II
Footbridge over River Churnet; 53.10997°N 2.03455°W		18th century	The footbridge over the River Churnet is in stone and consists of a single span with a shallow arch. The bridge has a string course, and a plain parapet with angular coping.	II
Garden wall and gate piers, Greystones; 53.10700°N 2.02363°W		18th century (probable)	The wall at the front of the garden is in stone, and is stepped on the sides. In the centre are stone gate piers with ball finials.	II
Brindley's corn mill 53.10964°N 2.03539°W		1752	A water mill designed and built by James Brindley which has been partly demolished. It is in brick and stone, with quoins, and has a tile roof. There are two storeys and three bays. On the left is a segmental arch with a keystone, and above it is a lunette. The other bays contain a round-arched window in each floor. On the right gable end is a waterwheel, above which is a round-arched window flanked by square windows in chamfered architraves. Inside, much of the machinery has been retained. The mill is also a scheduled monument.	II
10 Derby Street; 53.10569°N 2.02494°W	—	1760	A house, later offices, it was extended in the 19th century with the addition of a courthouse. The building is in brick with stone dressings, a moulded eaves cornice, and a tile roof. There are three storeys, and a front of five bays, the middle bay projecting under a pediment. The central doorway has an entablature containing the date, and a pediment on brackets. The window above the doorway is round-arched with an architrave, and in the pediment is a bull's eye window. The other windows are sashes with keystones. The courtroom has two storeys and four bays, and the yard at the front of the building is enclosed by cast-iron railings.	II
13 Derby Street; 53.10589°N 2.02455°W		Late 18th century	A house, later a shop, it was later remodelled with an extension at the front of the lower storey. It is in brick with a moulded eaves cornice, and a tile roof. There are three storeys and five bays, the ground floor containing a projecting shop front, and with sash windows in the upper floors.	II
5 Dog Lane; 53.10591°N 2.02593°W	—	Late 18th century	A house, later a shop, in red brick with blue brick headers and a tile roof. There are three storeys, a basement, and two bays. Steps with an iron rail lead up to the doorway that has an architrave and a panelled pediment on console brackets. To the left of the doorway is a sash window, the middle floor contains a mullioned and transomed window and an inserted window, both with cambered heads, in the top floor is a casement window, and in the basement is an iron-framed window.	II
9 and 10 Market Place; 53.10604°N 2.02516°W		Late 18th century	A house, later two shops, it was altered in the 19th and 20th centuries. The ground floor is in stone, the upper parts are in brick, there are sill bands, a moulded eaves cornice, and a tile roof with coped gables. There are four storeys, two bays, shop fronts in the ground floor, and sash windows above.	II
9–12 Overton Bank; 53.10638°N 2.02819°W		Late 18th century	A terrace of four brick cottages with tile roofs. They have two storeys, and each cottage has a double-pile plan and one bay. The doorways and windows, which are casements, have segmental heads.	II
19 St Edward Street; 53.10574°N 2.02662°W		Late 18th century	A house, later partly used for other purposes, it is in brick with a moulded stone fluted eaves cornice, and a tile roof with a coped gable on the left. There are three storeys and seven bays. The central doorway has fluted columns, twisted in the centre, with Corinthian capitals, a radial fanlight, a fluted frieze, a swagged cornice, and an open pediment. To the right is an inserted shop front with a fascia on brackets. The windows are sashes, the window above the doorway having a fluted lintel and cornice.	II
10 Stockwell Street; 53.10670°N 2.02437°W		Late 18th century	A house, later offices, it is in brick with sill bands, a moulded eaves cornice, a parapet, and a tile roof with coped gables. There are three storeys, three bays, and a short rear wing on the left. The central doorway has an architrave and a pediment on scrolled brackets, and the windows are sashes with keystones.	II
Clerk Bank House; 53.10673°N 2.02772°W	—	Late 18th century	The house, later offices, which was extended in the 19th century is in roughcast brick with a tile roof. The original part has angle quoins, a moulded eaves cornice, three storeys, and three bays. On the front is a canted bay window on the right, a small window in the centre of the middle floor with a round-headed architrave and Y-tracery, above it is a moulded circular panel, and the other windows are sashes in moulded architraves with keystones. To the right is a recessed extension with two storeys and two bays. It contains two doorways with fanlights and canopy hoods, and in the upper floor on the right is a large bow oriel window. The other windows are sashes.	II
Foxlowe; 53.10678°N 2.02526°W		Late 18th century	A house, later used for other purposes, it is in brick with sill bands, and a slate roof. There are three storeys, two parallel ranges, and a front of five bays. In the centre is a doorway with a Corinthian architrave, a cornice with paterae and triglyphs, and a traceried fanlight with swags in the spandrels. The windows are sashes, and the window above the doorway has an entablature. At the rear is a full-height bow window, a service wing, and other additions.	II
Garden walls, St Edward's Vicarage; 53.10677°N 2.02581°W	—	Late 18th century (probable)	The walls enclosing the garden of the vicarage are in stone with plain copings. They contain the sawn-off remains of iron railings.	II
The Wilkes Head Inn, 16 St Edward Street; 53.10614°N 2.02687°W		Late 18th century (probable)	The public house is in brick with quoins, a moulded stone eaves cornice and a tile roof. There are three storeys and three bays. The central doorway has a pediment on console brackets, to the left is a canted bay window with a doorway to the right, both under a fascia, and to the right is an inserted pub window. The other windows are casements with keystones.	II
Stable block, Westwood Hall Farm; 53.10324°N 2.05187°W	—	c. 1780	The stable block is in brick with roofs of tile and slate. There is a central block with a three-bay middle range linked on each side by curtain walls to single-bay pavilions. The middle bay of the central range has two storeys and a pedimented gable, the outer bays have one storey. The central range and pavilions contain round-arched doorways and circular pitching holes with stone surrounds and keystones.	II
240 Abbey Green Road; 53.11657°N 2.03150°W		c. 1800	A stone cottage with a tile roof, it has two storeys and two bays. There is a central doorway, and the windows contain Gothic tracery.	II
39 St Edward Street; 53.10533°N 2.02622°W		c. 1800	A house, later a shop, it is in brick with moulded stone eaves and a tile roof. There are three storeys and three bays. In the ground floor is a late 19th-century shop front with panelled pilasters and a fascia on consoles. The centre bay of the middle floor contains a blind window in round-arched recess, and the other windows are sashes with voussoir heads and keystones.	II
56 and 58 St Edward Street; 53.10479°N 2.02653°W		c. 1800	A pair of shops with living accommodation, they are in brick with a tile roof. There are three storeys and three bays. In the ground floor are two central doorways approached by steps with cast-iron railings. The doorways have moulded surrounds and fanlights, they are flanked by square bay windows with pilasters, and over all is a moulded cornice. To the right is a passage entry. The upper floors contain tripartite sash windows, and there is a single-light sash window to the right in the top floor.	II
Cottages to rear of 53 and 55 Derby Street, northern range 53.10625°N 2.02222°W	—	Late 18th or early 19th century	A row of three cottages, originally silk weavers' cottages, later used for other purposes. They are in red brick with blue brick headers and a tile roof. There are three storeys at the front and two at the rear, and each cottage has one bay. The doorways and windows have cambered heads; the windows are a mix of casements and horizontally-sliding sashes.	II
Cottages to rear of 53 and 55 Derby Street, southern range 53.10606°N 2.02220°W	—	Late 18th or early 19th century	A row of three cottages, originally silk weavers' cottages, they are in red brick with blue brick headers, dentilled eaves, and a tile roof. There are three storeys at the front and two at the rear, and each cottage has one bay. The doorways and windows have cambered heads.	II
Barnfields Canal Aqueduct; 53.09373°N 2.03282°W		1801	The aqueduct carried the end of the Leek Arm of the Caldon Canal over the River Churnet. It is in stone and consists of a single arch with rusticated voussoirs, a string course, and stepped and curved parapets.	II
Bridge No. 9, (Wall Grange Farm Bridge); 53.09154°N 2.03157°W		1801	The bridge carries a track over the Leek Arm of the Caldon Canal. It is in red sandstone, and consists of a single elliptical arch. The bridge has a string course, and a plain parapet with end piers.	II
East tunnel entrance, Caldon Canal; 53.08687°N 2.03730°W		1801	The entrance to the canal tunnel is in rusticated stone, and has a steep elliptical arch with a keystone. The retaining walls are slightly curved, and have a cornice and end piers.	II
Albion Mill; 53.10271°N 2.02516°W		c. 1815	A silk mill, later used for other purposes, it is in red brick with blue brick headers, stone dressings, and a tile roof. There are three storeys, 15 bays along Albion Street, and three on King Street. The windows are sash windows, and on the roof is a cupola with an ogee lead roof. On King Street, to the right, is a two-storey bay that contains an archway with voussoirs and quoins.	II
27–33 London Street; 53.10371°N 2.02339°W		c. 1820	A terrace of four houses in red brick with blue brick headers and a tile roof. There are three storeys and each house has two bays. In the ground floor the doorways and casement windows have cambered heads, No. 31 has a tripartite shop window with a moulded architrave and a cornice, and between No. 31 and No. 33 is a round-headed entry. The middle floor contains windows with Gothic heads and Y-tracery, and in the top floor are long weavers' windows.	II
Farm buildings, Dieu-la-Cres Abbey Farm; 53.11793°N 2.02707°W	—	c. 1820	The farm buildings are in stone, incorporating material from Dieu-la-Cres Abbey, and the roofs are slated. They enclose three sides of a farmyard, with a two-storey byre, a two-storey barn, and a single-storey byre. The buildings have doorways with pointed arches, and the features incorporated from the abbey include tracery, a coffin lid, vaulting ribs, moulded capitals, and roof bosses.	II
Eastern stable range, Dieu-la-Cres Abbey Farm; 53.11808°N 2.02677°W	—	c. 1820	The stable range is in stone, incorporating material from Dieu-la-Cres Abbey, and the roof is slated. The range has a single storey, and contains three stable doors. The features incorporated from the abbey include corbel heads.	II
Western stable range, Dieu-la-Cres Abbey Farm; 53.11771°N 2.02739°W		c. 1820	The stable range is in stone, incorporating material from Dieu-la-Cres Abbey, and the roof is slated. The range has two storeys and four bays, and contains doorways and windows with pointed heads. The gable end is ornamented with material from the abbey, including ogee window tracery, and vaulting rib fragments, forming symmetrical patterns.	II
2, 3 and 4 Gaunt Buildings, Derby Street; 53.10586°N 2.02390°W	—	Early 19th century	A house, later shops with living accommodation above, it is in brick with a tile roof. There are three storeys, five bays, and a two-storey canted wing at the rear. The ground floor projects with shop fronts, and above are sash windows, the middle window in the centre bay in an segmentally-arched recess. The entrance at the rear has a doorway with a Doric architrave, and in the wing is a Venetian window.	II
1 Overton Bank; 53.10652°N 2.02739°W		Early 19th century	The building is in red brick with blue brick headers, a modillion eaves cornice, and a hipped Welsh slate roof. There are two storeys and one bay. The central doorway has an architrave, and is flanked by canted bay windows. In the upper floor is a large oriel window.	II
2 Overton Bank; 53.10650°N 2.02748°W		Early 19th century	The house is in red brick with blue brick headers and a tile roof. There are two storeys and one bay. The doorway to the left has a moulded architrave, and to the right is a canted bay window. The upper floors contain tripartite sash windows, the window in the middle floor with a keystone.	II
43 and 45 St Edward Street; 53.10514°N 2.02612°W		Early 19th century	A pair of houses, later offices, they are in brick with a moulded stone eaves cornice, and a slate roof with coped gables. There are three storeys and four bays. The third bay is gabled, it projects slightly and contains a wide segmental-arched entrance to a courtyard. The arch has quoins and voussoirs, and above are tripartite sash windows in architraves. To the left is a round-headed doorway and a shop front with a square oriel window, and the other windows are sashes.	II
70 and 72 St Edward Street; 53.10437°N 2.02609°W		Early 19th century	A house, later a shop and living accommodation, it is in brick with a moulded stone eaves cornice and a slate roof. There are three storeys and five bays. In the centre is an entrance with a stone Doric architrave and an entablature, and the doorway has a traceried fanlight. To the right is an early 20th-century shop front, and the windows are sashes. To the left is another doorway ins a stone architrave.	II
16 and 18 Stockwell Street; 53.10678°N 2.02398°W		Early 19th century	A house, later divided and used for other purposes, and with a silk warehouse at the rear. The house is in brick with a roof of tiles and slates. There are three storeys and five bays. On the front is a doorway with a reeded architrave and an inscribed panel above, and square bay windows with moulded entablatures containing round-arched sash windows. The upper floors contain sash windows. The warehouse has two storeys and a basement, and contains a loading door and fixed-light windows with iron glazing, and attached is another building with two storeys and five bays.	II
Maude Institute, Clerk Bank; 53.10685°N 2.02845°W		Early 19th century	The building is in brick with stone quoins and a Welsh slate roof. The central doorway has a steeply pointed head, clustered shafts and a fanlight with interlacing glazing. Above the door is an inscribed quatrefoil panel, and the windows are sashes.	II
Milepost at NGR SJ 987 544; 53.08749°N 2.02040°W		Early 19th century	The milepost on the west side of the A520 road is in cast iron, and has a triangular plan and a sloping top. On the top is "LOWE", and the sides indicate the distances to Leek, Cheddleton, Wetley Rocks, Hilderstone, Sandon, and Stafford.	II
Milepost at NGR SK 00012 57696; 53.11646°N 2.00134°W		Early 19th century	The milepost is on the east side of the A53 road, and is in cast iron. It has a cylindrical shaft and a domed top, and indicated the distances to Leek and to Buxton.	II
Milestone at NGR SJ 988 543; 53.08609°N 2.01931°W		Early 19th century	The milestone is set into a wall on the east side of the A520 road. It is in stone with a cast-iron plate indicating the distances to London, Sandon, and Leek.	II
38–46 King Street; 53.10284°N 2.02480°W		c. 1825–28	A terrace of five houses in red brick with burnt headers, and a Welsh slate roof. There are three storeys and basements, a double pile plan, and each house has one bay. The doorways have round heads, the doorway to No. 38 has a pediment, and the windows in the two lower floors are sash windows. In the top floor are weavers' windows with horizontal-sliding sashes.	II
35–41 London Street; 53.10355°N 2.02325°W		c. 1830	A terrace of four houses in red brick with blue brick headers and a tile roof. There are two storeys and each house has two bays. In the ground floor the doorways and casement windows have cambered heads, and the upper floor contains windows with pointed heads and Y-tracery.	II
43–51 London Street; 53.10342°N 2.02308°W	—	c. 1830	A terrace of five houses in red brick with blue brick headers, No. 51 painted, and a tile roof. There are two storeys and each house has two bays. In the ground floor the doorways and casement windows have cambered heads, and the upper floor contains windows with pointed heads and Y-tracery.	II
Milepost at NGR SJ 996 557; 53.09926°N 2.00753°W		1834	The milepost is on the west side of the A523 road. It is in cast iron, and has a cylindrical shaft and a drum-shaped top with two panels. On the panels are the distances to Leek and to Ashbourne, and on the shaft is the distance to London. The date and the name of the foundry are on the top.	II
Milepost at NGR SJ 973 551; 53.09361°N 2.04058°W		c. 1835	The milepost is on the west side of the A52 road. It is in cast iron, it has a triangular section, and indicates the distances to Leek, Newcastle-under-Lyme, and Burslem.	II
Moorlands Hospital; 53.10257°N 2.01002°W	—	1838	Originally a workhouse designed by Bateman and Drury, and later a hospital, it is in red brick with a moulded cornice, a blocking course, and a slate roof. The main block has three storeys and ten bays, at the rear is a wing linked to an octagonal block from which run three cruciform wings. On the front, above the middle three bays is a pediment. The central doorway has a porch with paired Doric columns, and the windows have moulded keystones. Flanking the main range are single-story three-bay pavilions with central pediments.	II
Buxton House, 177 Buxton Road; 53.10904°N 2.01068°W	—	c. 1840	A brick house with overhanging eaves and a slate roof, two storeys, and three bays. The central doorway has a moulded architrave and a traceried fanlight. The windows are sashes, and in the left return is a full-height stair window.	II
Pickwood Hall; 53.10000°N 2.01715°W	—	c. 1840	The house, which incorporates earlier material, was extended and remodelled in 1896 by William Larner Sugden. It is built in stone with some brick in the rear wing, and has a slate roof. The main block has two storeys and three bays, the rear wing has three storeys, and in the angle is an Italianate tower. On the front is a central Tuscan portico flanked by canted bay windows, and the windows in the upper floor are sashes.	II
St Luke's Church; 53.10624°N 2.01897°W		1847–48	The tower was added in 1854, and the chancel was extended in 1873. The church is built in stone with Welsh slate roofs, and is in Decorated style. It consists of a nave, north and south aisles, a chancel with vestries, and a west tower. The tower has three stages, a southwest stair turret, a west doorway, a three-light west window, and a traceried parapet containing statues of saints on eagle corbels. The chancel has buttresses with crocketed gablets on corbel heads, and the east window has five lights.	II*
Cross Street Mills; 53.10560°N 2.01787°W		c. 1850-60	A silk mill that was expanded in about 1900 and later used for other purposes, it is in red brick, with dressings in blue brick and stone, and has slate roofs. There are three blocks, the central block has three storeys and six bays, to the right and projecting is a block with three storeys, three bays, and a balustraded parapet, and to the left is a block with two storeys, seven bays on Cross Street, ten bays on Well Street, and a curved bay on the corner. The curved bay has giant pilasters, a triple window in the ground floor, a Venetian window above, and over that an inscribed cartouche.	II
Overton Bank House; 53.10645°N 2.02763°W		Mid-19th century	The house, which possibly has an earlier origin, is in brick with a sill band, a moulded eaves cornice, and a slate roof. There are three storeys and three bays. Steps lead up to the central round-headed doorway that has a traceried fanlight, the windows are sashes, and at the rear is a round-headed stair window.	II
Westwood Hall; 53.10391°N 2.05187°W		1850–53	A country house, later a school, it was designed by Hadfield, Weightman and Goldie in Elizabethan style, and is built in brick with some red sandstone, and it has tile roofs. There are two storeys and attics, and an irregular courtyard plan. On the entrance front, to the left, is a clock tower containing an archway, mullioned windows, an oriel window, coped gables on each front, and a Gothic belfry with a weathervane. To the right is a range of five bays with a central full-height porch flanked by bay windows. The other windows are mullioned and transomed, and there are three coped gables with ball finials. The garden front has eight bays, and includes bay windows and a bow window.	II
Summer house, Westwood Hall; 53.10423°N 2.05093°W		1850–53	The summer house in the grounds of the hall is in red sandstone on a plinth, and has a tile roof with a pineapple finial. There is an octagonal plan, and it contains a four-centred arched doorway with a triple round-arched mullioned fanlight, and triple round-arched mullioned and transomed windows with a sill band in the other faces.	II
Arch Lodge, Westwood Park Drive; 53.10425°N 2.04420°W		1852	Originally a lodge to Westwood Hall, it is in red sandstone with a tile roof, and is in Jacobean style. It consists of a tower with a segmental arch over the former drive, and a two-storey single-bay range to the left. Above the arch are string courses with the date between, and a five-light mullioned window, the centre light with a round head. The range also has mullioned windows, and a gabled dormer.	II
London Mill; 53.10499°N 2.01753°W		1853	The former silk mill is in brick with overhanging eaves and a slate roof. There are four storeys and a front of 19 bays, the middle three bays projecting, flanked by quoins, and with a pediment containing the date. The central doorway has an architrave and a pediment with acroteria. The windows have cast-iron frames and 20 panes, some opening, in the right bay is a cast-iron fire escape, and the right gable end contains loading doors.	II
Wellington Mill; 53.10478°N 2.02970°W		1853	A former silk mill, it is in brick with a slate roof, and consists of a main block, and buildings at the rear that include an engine house and a boiler house. The main block has four storeys and 14 bays, the middle four bays slightly projecting under a pediment. The round-headed doorway has a stone architrave, and the windows have iron frames. At the rear is a projecting privy tower, to the east is an extension with three storeys and three bays, and beyond this is a further range with four storeys and four bays.	II
Boundary stone at NGR SJ 996 558; 53.09994°N 2.00805°W		1855	The boundary stone is on the west side of the A523 road and marked the outer limit of the administrative area of Leek. It has a rounded top, and is inscribed with the date and initials.	II
Boundary stone at NGR SJ 995 558; 53.10023°N 2.00783°W	—	1855	The boundary stone is on the east side of the A523 road and marked the outer limit of the administrative area of Leek. It has a rounded top, and is inscribed with the date and initials.	II
Boundary stone at NGR SJ 987 552; 53.09418°N 2.02161°W	—	1855	The boundary stone is on the east side of the A520 road and marked the outer limit of the administrative area of Leek. It has a rounded top, and is inscribed with the date and initials.	II
Boundary stone at NGR SJ 986 552; 53.09378°N 2.02198°W		1855	The boundary stone is on the west side of the A520 road and marked the outer limit of the administrative area of Leek. It has a rounded top, and is inscribed with the date and initials.	II
Boundary stone at NGR SJ 972 573; 53.11252°N 2.04274°W		1855	The boundary stone is on the southwest side of the A523 road and marked the outer limit of the administrative area of Leek. It has a rounded top, and is inscribed with the date and initials.	II
Lady o'th'Dale Well; 53.10053°N 2.02094°W	—	1855	The wellhead is in rusticated stone. It is about 2 metres (6 ft 7 in) high, and has a dated gable and a slightly recessed niche.	II
Rosebank House; 53.10786°N 2.01934°W	—	1857	The house, designed by William Sugden, is in brick with overhanging eaves, and a hipped Welsh slate roof. There are two storeys, three bays, and a rear service wing. In the centre is a rusticated stone porch, and the windows are sashes.	II
Drinking fountain 53.11017°N 2.00770°W		c. 1860	The drinking fountain is on the southwest side of Buxton Road, and is in stone. It consists of a central rectangular pillar with pedimented coping, and it contains a niche with a tap and a marble basin. There are lower flanking walls, and a cast-iron railing with scrollwork behind.	II
The Big Mill; 53.10801°N 2.03172°W		c. 1860	A silk mill designed by William Sugden in Italianate style, it is in brick with stone dressings, pilasters, a cornice, and a parapet. There are six storeys, 21 bays on the front, and five on the sides. In the centre is a seven-storey stair tower with rusticated quoins, string courses, and a moulded cornice, the top storey is arcaded, and there is a shallow pyramidal roof. In the tower is a round-arched doorway with a fanlight and a keystone. The ground floor windows have round-arched heads and form an arcade, and the upper floors contain windows with iron frames and flat stone lintels. At the rear are an engine house and a boiler house.	II
Front wall, The Big Mill; 53.10818°N 2.03172°W		c. 1860	The retaining boundary wall at the front of the mill was designed by William Sugden. It is in stone and has pilasters, a cornice and coping, and contains two gateways with rusticated arches, side pilasters, and entablatures.	II
Leek Brook junction signal box 53.08109°N 2.02951°W		Late 1860s	The signal box was built by the North Staffordshire Railway and is now on the Churnet Valley Railway. The lower two storeys are in Staffordshire blue brick, the top storey is in wooden weatherboarding, and the roof is slated. On the railway side are two blocked round-arched windows, and the top storey contains continuous fenestration. There is a balcony on cast-iron brackets and an entrance porch, and inside is a 40 lever frame.	II
11 Market Place; 53.10599°N 2.02512°W	—	c. 1870	A public house designed by William Sugden, and later a shop, it has a stuccoed ground floor, it is in brick above, and has a moulded eaves cornice and overhanging eaves. There are three storeys and one bay. In the ground floor is a doorway and two windows, all round headed, with a continuous hood mould, and between them are shafts with moulded footings. The upper floors contain windows with round-arched heads, with three lights in the middle floor, and two in the top floor. Recessed to the left is passage entry with a segmental arch, and round-headed windows above.	II
Cemetery chapels 53.10010°N 2.02477°W		1870	The cemetery chapels, designed by William Sugden in Gothic style, are in stone with Welsh slate roofs. They consist of a central arch over which is a steeple flanked by chapels. The steeple has a tower with two stages, chamfered plinths, pinnacles on the top plinth, and a spire with an octagonal lower part and gabled lucarnes. The chapels are entered under the archway, and have buttresses and three-light east windows.	II
Cemetery gate and gate piers 53.10027°N 2.02174°W	—	c. 1870	Designed by William Sugden, the three gate piers at the entrance to the cemetery are in stone, and have recessed trefoiled panels and gableted caps. Between them are a main gate and a pedestrian gate in cast iron.	II
Hargreaves School, Alsop Street; 53.10336°N 2.02701°W	—	1873	The former school is in brick with stone dressings, it has a green slate roof with coped gables, and is in Gothic style. There are two storeys and five bays, with gables over the third and fifth bays. The left bay projects, it has a tower, and contains a doorway with a pointed head, a moulded surround, and is flanked by buttresses with gablets. Above it is a dated tablet, a two-light window, and a rose window. The other bays contain paired windows in both floors, separated by shafts with foliate capitals.	II
Spout Hall, 66 and 68 St Edward Street; 53.10447°N 2.02626°W		1873	A house, later divided into flats, the ground floor is in stone, the upper parts are timber-framed, and the roof is tiled. There are three storeys and an attic, and four bays, the outer bays taller and gabled. In the ground floor, the left bay contains a wide pointed arch on corbels with a hood mould. The doorway is in the right bay, and has a moulded architrave, a four-centred arched head, and a mullioned fanlight, and in the middle bays are mullioned and transomed windows. The upper floors are jettied with a moulded bressumer, and they contain continuous windows.	II
The Quiet Woman Public House, 73 St Edward Street; 53.10445°N 2.02589°W		Late 19th century	The public house is the refronting of an earlier building, possibly with a timber-framed core. It is in brick with stone dressings and a tile roof. There are two storeys and three bays. In the centre is a doorway that has a four-centred arched head and a hood mould with shield corbels, flanked by canted bay windows. The windows are mullioned and have lights with round heads. Each bay has a coped and moulded Dutch gable containing diapering, and surmounted by a ball finial.	II
12 Haywood Street; 53.10447°N 2.02336°W		c. 1876	A former silk mill designed by William Sugden, it is in brick with a Welsh slate roof. There are four storeys, three bays on the gabled front facing Haywood Street, and ten along Shoobridge Street. The windows in the ground floor have flat heads, in the first floor the heads are cambered, in the second floor they have round heads, and the top floor contains a round-headed window in the centre flanked by flat-headed windows. Above are pilasters corbelled out and carrying a bellcote. The windows have cast-iron glazing and a central opening light. At the rear is a small building with a hipped roof.	II
29, 29A and 29B Queen Street; 53.10651°N 2.01924°W	—	1877	A row of three houses designed by William Larner Sugden in Queen Anne style. They are in brick with terracotta dressings, two storeys and attics. The left house has a projecting gable with a canted bay window flanked by doorways. The upper floor is corbelled out and contains a three-light window with terracotta mullions, and in the top floor are two round-headed windows. The other houses have round-headed doorways with canopies, bay windows between the doors, three light windows in the upper floor, and each house has a gabled dormer. All the gables have decorative bargeboards and finials. In front of the two right houses is a low wall with railings.	II
Gate and walls, Condlyffe Almshouses; 53.10077°N 2.02434°W		1877 (possible)	The gateway between the blocks of almshouses is in brick with stone dressings. It has a four-centred arch above which is a coped triangular gable containing an inscribed shield, and surmounted by a cross finial. Flanking the gateway is a low stone wall.	II
33 and 35 Bath Street; 53.10677°N 2.02204°W	—	1880	A pair of houses designed by William Larner Sugden in Queen Anne style. They are in brick with terracotta dressings, tiled roofs, three storeys and three bays. The middle bay contains paired doorways, at the entrance is a retaining wall with three terracotta rosettes, and steps lead up to round-headed recessed porches with a central stone shaft. Above is a sash window flanked by terracotta panels with low-relief containing initials, and at the top is a dormer with the date in a pediment. The outer bays project and are gabled, in the ground floor are bay windows, the middle floor contains sash windows with curved aprons and curved pedimented heads, and in the apex is another sash window.	II
138 Buxton Road; 53.10833°N 2.01111°W	—	c. 1880	A house designed by William Larner Sugden in Queen Anne style, it is in brick with timber framing, and has overhanging eaves and a tile roof. There are two storeys and three bays, the outer bays projecting and gabled with bargeboards, and with jettied upper storeys. The centre bay contains a recessed porch, above which is a balcony and French doors. In the upper floor of the left bay is an oriel window, and the other windows are mullioned.	II
Condlyffe Almshouses; 53.10090°N 2.02433°W		1882	The ground floor of the almshouses is in brick with stone dressings, the upper parts are timber-framed, and the roofs are tiled. They consist of two similar blocks, each with a central range consisting of two gabled storeys and two bays flanked by single-storey gabled wings. Between the central range and wing are doorways. The windows are mullioned or mullioned and transomed, and the gables have finials and inscribed bargeboards.	II
National Westminster Bank, Derby Street; 53.10560°N 2.02354°W		1882	The bank, designed by William Larner Sugden, is in brick with stone dressings and a tile roof. There are two storeys and three bays, and a single-storey porch on the right. The porch has rusticated piers, a doorway with a broken pediment, over which is a lunette and a cartouche. The largest bay is on the right, it is gabled, and contains a bow window. The upper storey and gable are jettied with a moulded bressumer. In the upper storey are two oriel windows between which is a balustraded balcony, and below the windows and in the gable is pargeting, the gable also containing a coat of arms. The left bay has a smaller gable that is also jettied and contains pargeting.	II
Nicholson Institute, Stockwell Street; 53.10731°N 2.02370°W		1882–84	Built as an institute and library designed by William Larner Sugden, a technical college was added in 1899–1900, and it was later used as a museum and art gallery. It is built in brick with stone dressings, and is in Renaissance style. The original part has two storeys and a basement, and three bays. The left bay contains a bow window flanked by square turrets with domed heads, and above is a Dutch gable with a pediment. The middle bay contains a large mullioned and transomed window with an entablature containing busts in low-relief, above which is a broken pediment and a balustrade with urns. The right bay is a projecting tower with steps leading up to a round-headed entrance flanked by fluted shafts, over which is a pediment with an inscribed tablet. Above this is a mullioned and transomed window, in the top stage is a round window, and a dome with a copper roof. At the rear right is the later part, with two storeys, three bays, a central gable, and large windows with round and segmental heads containing relief plasterwork in the tympana.	II*
Gate piers, railings and gates, Nicholson Institute; 53.10710°N 2.02318°W		1882–84	The entrance to the institute was designed by William Larner Sugden. The gate piers are in rusticated stone, and have ball finials. The gates are in cast iron and have openwork piers with wrought iron scrolled finials.	II
60 St Edward Street; 53.10472°N 2.02649°W		1883	A shop and living accommodation, the ground floor is in stone, the upper parts have applied timber framing, and the roof is tiled. There are three storeys and an attic, two parallel ranges, and a front of two bays. In the ground floor are two shop fronts, between which is a doorway with a pointed arch and a hood mould, and to the right is a wider pointed arch leading to a courtyard. The middle floor contains two oriel windows on brackets, one canted, the other square, with a carved coat of arms between them. The top floor is jettied, and contains three mullioned and transomed windows. The attic is gabled, and contains casement windows with moulded bressumers above, and on the gable is a weathervane.	II
Bank House, 20 and 22 St Edward Street; 53.10609°N 2.02697°W		1885	Originally a bank designed by William Owen in Venetian style, and later used for other purposes, the ground floor is in stone, the upper parts are in red brick with dressings in blue brick, and the roof is slated. There are two storeys and an attic, and a front of three bays. The ground floor is arcaded, with the doorway to the right, and the round-headed windows divided by pilasters, some rusticated, and the others twisted. Above the ground floor is a moulded cornice, and the windows are round-headed, some arcaded, and with continuous hood moulds. Above the right bay is a pedimented gable, and over the other bays are overhanging eaves. On the left return is a cartouche.	II
All Saints' Church; 53.10229°N 2.02393°W		1885–87	The church, designed by Richard Norman Shaw, is built in stone with tile roofs. It consists of a nave with a clerestory, north and south aisles, a northwest porch, a tower at the crossing, and a chancel above a vestry. The tower has clasping buttresses, a parapet stepped to resemble embattling, and a pyramidal roof with a weathervane. The east window is wide, and contains nine lights.	I
St Mary's Church; 53.10353°N 2.02529°W		1886–87	A Roman Catholic church designed by Albert Vicars, it is in stone with Welsh slate roofs. The church consists of a nave with a clerestory, north and south aisles, a southwest porch, a sanctuary with vestries, and a southeast steeple. The steeple has a tower with clasping buttresses, a south doorway with a statue and a canopy above, triple lancet windows, a rose window, and a broach spire with pinnacles and two tiers of lucarnes. At the west end is another rose window, and the east end contains a five-light window with Decorated tracery.	II
Bird in Hand Public House, Market Place; 53.10607°N 2.02570°W		1889	The public house designed by William Larner Sugden, is on a corner site, and has a stone ground floor, applied timber framing above, and a tile roof. There are three storeys, two gabled bays facing Market Place and one facing Sheep Market. In the ground floor is a doorway with a moulded architrave, an ogival arch, and an entablature, and it is flanked by mullioned windows. The upper storey is jettied, it has a moulded bressumer with foliate scrollwork, and contains a ten-light mullioned oriel window. The top storey is also jettied, with an embattled chamfered bressumer, and two three-light mullioned windows. The bargeboards have scrollwork decoration.	II
Lamp standard, Market Place; 53.10637°N 2.02549°W		c. 1890	The lamp standard is in cast iron on a stone plinth. It has a moulded base, a raised pedestal, and a clustered column with a moulded capital. Curved brackets with scrollwork carry four lamps, and there is a central openwork finial.	II
Former police station, house, stables and wall 53.10430°N 2.02249°W		1891	The former police station is in red brick with stone dressings, quoins, a string course, a moulded cornice, and a tile roof. There are two storeys and a basement, a main block of seven bays and recessed flanking wings with two bays. Between the main block and the wings are turrets, corbelled out with conical roofs. In the centre is a round-headed arch containing the entrance that has a stone architrave, pilasters, and an entablature, above which is a coat of arms and a round-arched window. The other windows are sashes with stone architraves, flat heads in the ground floor, and round-arched heads with keystones above. The right wing, formerly a house, has a doorway with a fanlight and a canopy, a canted bay window and a Venetian window above. To the left is an entrance arch and wall, with stone banding and ball finials, and to the left of that is the former superintendent's house. This has three storeys, three bays, and bay windows in the ground floor. The central bay rises to form a low tower with a pyramidal roof, and the outer bays are gabled. At the rear is a courtyard with stables.	II
Waterloo Mill; 53.10498°N 2.03280°W		1893–94	A former silk mill, it is in brick with stone dressings and a slate roof. There are four storeys, 18 bays on the front, and four on the sides. In the centre is a projecting stair tower with a pyramidal copper roof. The tower contains a round-arched doorway with a cornice above, over which is a full-height round-arched recess with pilasters, and at the top is a modillioned cornice. In the ground floor of the flanking ranges are arcades of round-arched windows with keystones, and the floors above contain iron-framed windows with 25 panes, central opening lights, and chamfered lintels. At the rear is a single-storey building.	II
Victoria Buildings; 53.10421°N 2.02613°W		1897	A row of shops with living accommodation on a corner site. The ground floor is in stone with a moulded cornice above the ground floor, the upper parts are timber-framed, and the roof is tiled. There are three storeys, four bays on Brook Street, two on St Edward Street, and an angled bay on the corner, all gabled. The ground floor contains shop fronts, on Brook Street is an entry with a circular window above, and the middle floor contains mullioned windows. The top storey is jettied, and contains oriel windows.	II
Public Conveniences, Mill Street; 53.10654°N 2.02843°W		c. 1900	The public conveniences are in brick with a lead roof, and have an octagonal plan and a single storey. On the roof is a louvred cupola, on the sides are lunettes, and attached is a serpentine wall.	II
The Unicorn Public House, 75 St Edward Street; 53.10433°N 2.02579°W		c. 1900	The former public house, which stands on a corner site, has a ground floor in stone, the upper parts are in brick, the attic is rendered, and the roof is tiled. There are two storeys and an attic, and fronts of two bays. The doorway has a moulded surround with an entablature and a scrolled pediment, and is flanked by transomed windows. The upper floor contains two oriel windows with bulbous aprons on each front. The attic is overhanging, and contains two gabled oriel dormers on St Edward Street, and one on Brook Street; the other bay in Brook Street contains a gable with a five-light window, and a circular window above.	II
Milepost at SJ 988 532; 53.07640°N 2.03289°W		Early 20th century (probable)	The milepost is on the east side of the A520 road. It is in cast iron and has a triangular section and a sloping top. On the top is "CHEDDLETON" and on the sides are the distances to Cheddleton, Wetley Rocks, Hilderstone, Sandon, Stafford and Leek.	II
Gunside and Bettyswood, Park Road; 53.11123°N 2.02571°W	—	1912	A house in Queen Anne style later divided into two dwellings. It is in vitrified blue brick with dressings in red brick, quoins, a string course, a moulded eaves cornice, and a hipped tile roof. There are two storeys and an attic, and an E-shaped plan, with a front of seven bays, the outer two bays on each side projecting and gabled. In the centre is a projecting porch with an architrave, a cornice, an iron balcony, and a French window above. The windows are sashes, those in the ground floor with cambered heads and keystones, and in the attic there are dormers with hipped roofs.	II
Ferne-Lea, Cranford and wall, Fynney Street; 53.10237°N 2.02276°W	—	1912	A pair of brick houses with a tile roof in simple Arts and Crafts style. They have two storeys, an asymmetrical front of four bays, and projecting gabled bays of differing sizes. The windows are mullioned, and there is a mullioned and transomed stair window. The left doorway has a round head with a stepped arch, the right doorway has a chamfered architrave. At the rear are two full-height canted bay windows. The attached wall to the left contains two archways.	II
Highbarn, Fynney Street; 53.10219°N 2.02254°W	—	c. 1912	The house is in brick with some timber framing and a tile roof. There are two storeys and four bays. The left bay is wide and gabled and contains mullioned windows, and to the right is a narrow entrance bay. The third bay is also gabled, it is timber framed, and has brick infill in the lower floor and decorative panels above.	II
Ball Haye Green War Memorial; 53.11286°N 2.01445°W		1922	The war memorial consists of the gateway to a recreation ground. It is in Alderley Edge sandstone, and consists of a segmental arch flanked by square columns on deep plinths, each with an embossed keystone, over which is an inscribed frieze. The columns have stepped tops, and each has a wreath containing a date, under which is a bronze plaque with a Tudor rose containing the names of those lost and those who served in the First World War.	II
St Edward's War Memorial; 53.10678°N 2.02697°W		1922	The war memorial is in the churchyard of St Edward's Church. It is in limestone, and consists of a Celtic-style wheel-cross on a tapering shaft. The shaft is on a rectangular plinth on a base of three steps. On the front of the cross and shaft is interlace carving, in the centre of the cross is the IHS Christogram, and on the rear is a Sword of Sacrifice in relief. On the plinth are inscriptions relating to both World Wars.	II
Leek War Memorial; 53.10566°N 2.02078°W		1924–25	The war memorial is in the form of a clock tower designed by Percy Worthington, and is in Portland stone. The lower stage is channelled and contains a doorway and bronze plaques in moulded architraves. Above this are doors behind a balcony, and towards the top of the tower are round-arched windows, and clock faces in laurel wreaths. There is a pyramidal roof, and below it is a frieze with the names of battles in the First World War. The tower is approached by steps and surrounded by a wall containing gates and lamp standards, and on the wall are memorial panels.	II
Telephone kiosk, Market Place; 53.10661°N 2.02557°W		1935	A K6 type telephone kiosk, designed by Giles Gilbert Scott. Constructed in cast iron with a square plan and a dome, it has three unperforated crowns in the top panels.	II
