= St Edward the Confessor's Church, Leek =

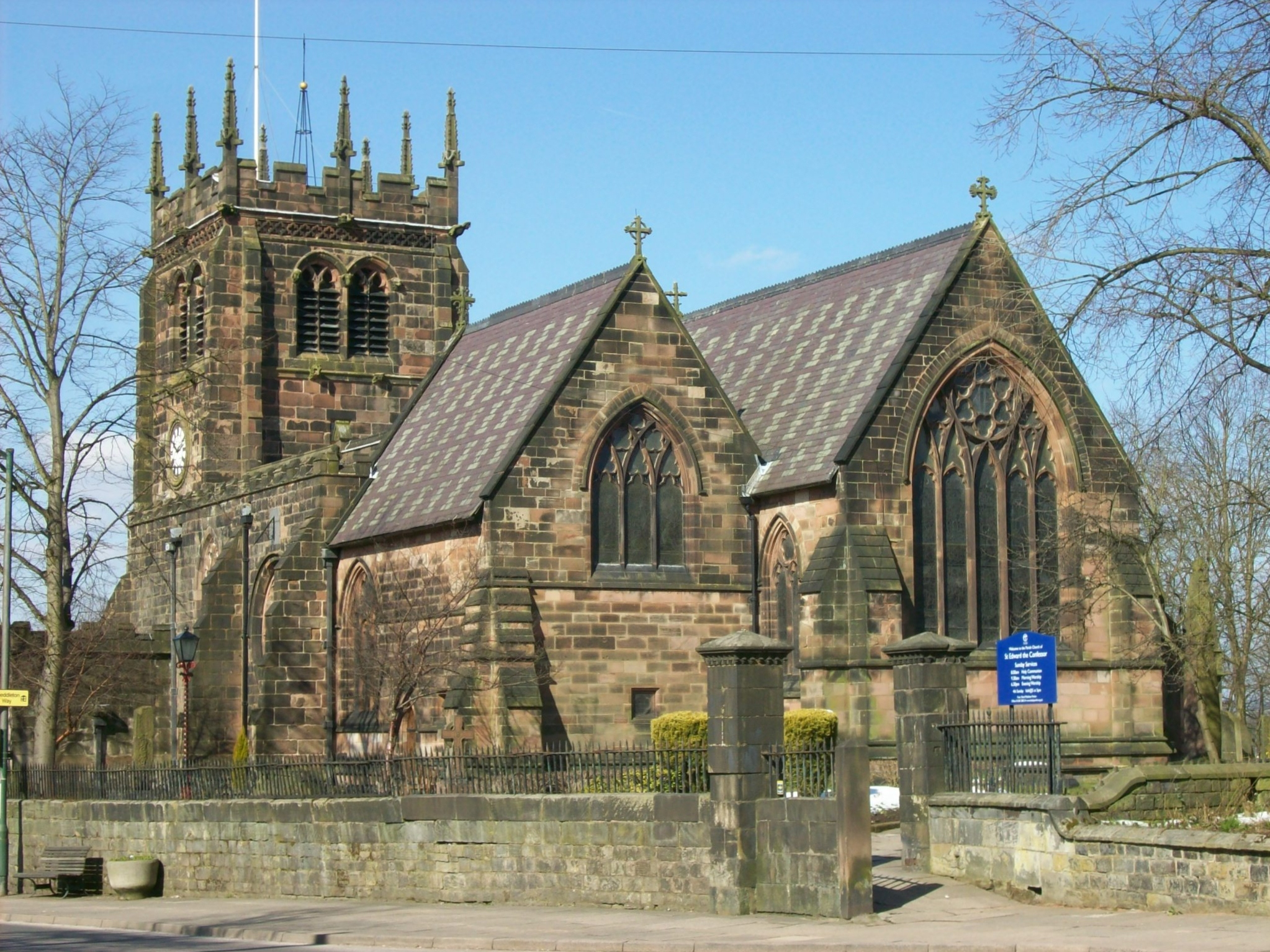
- St Edward the Confessor's Church, Leek
- 53°06′25″N 2°01′35″W
- OS grid reference: SJ 983 566
- Location: Leek, Staffordshire
- Country: England
- Denomination: Church of England

History
- Dedication: St Edward the Confessor

Architecture
- Heritage designation: Grade II*
- Designated: 1951

Administration
- Diocese: Diocese of Lichfield

St Edward the Confessor's Church is an active Anglican church in Leek, Staffordshire, England. The building, which dates back to the 13th century, is listed Grade II*.

It is Leek's original parish church, although the parish now includes other churches such as All Saints which were built as the town's population increased.

== Restorations ==
Much of the church's appearance reflects two 19th-century restorations. The first was by Ewan Christian, who in 1847 was appointed consulting architect to the Lichfield Diocesan Building Society. He went on to carry out many more restorations as architect to the Ecclesiastical Commissioners. The church's second restoration was by George Edmund Street, a leading practitioner of the Victorian Gothic Revival.

== Glass, memorials and textiles ==
There is stained glass made by Morris and Co, including designs by George Frederick Bodley (north and south rose windows), Edward Burne-Jones (north aisle east window) and John Henry Dearle (south aisle window). The church owns examples of the work of the Leek School of Embroidery which was founded in 1879/1880 by the embroideress Lady Elizabeth Wardle and her husband Sir Thomas Wardle. One of the windows is a memorial to her.

Within the church are the Leek Air Crews WWII Memorial Board and the Pte H. A. Tudor Memorial.

== Churchyard ==
The wall surrounding the churchyard and the lychgate are listed Grade II. The churchyard contains two early medieval (11th century according to one source) crosses which are listed Grade II and are also protected as scheduled monuments

- Cross, south
- Cross, southeast

=== Double sunset ===
The churchyard is notable as a place for viewing a double sunset on and around the summer solstice. The sun has been observed to set twice behind a hill some six miles from Leek. The phenomenon was first described by Robert Plot in a 1686 publication.

The double sunset is still visible from Leek, depending on the weather. There is some debate as to how long the phenomenon, as publicised by Plot, had been visible (the astronomical alignments change over time). It has been calculated that the double sunset predates the arrival of Christianity in Roman Britain. There has been speculation that the site was regarded as a holy place in pagan times and that the construction of a church was done to Christianise it.

== See also ==
- Grade II* listed buildings in Staffordshire Moorlands
- Listed buildings in Leek, Staffordshire

== Notes and references ==
Notes

1. A shortened version of Kilburn's article can be accessed at Dr. Plot and the Amazing Double Sunset.
