= All Saints' Church, Leek =

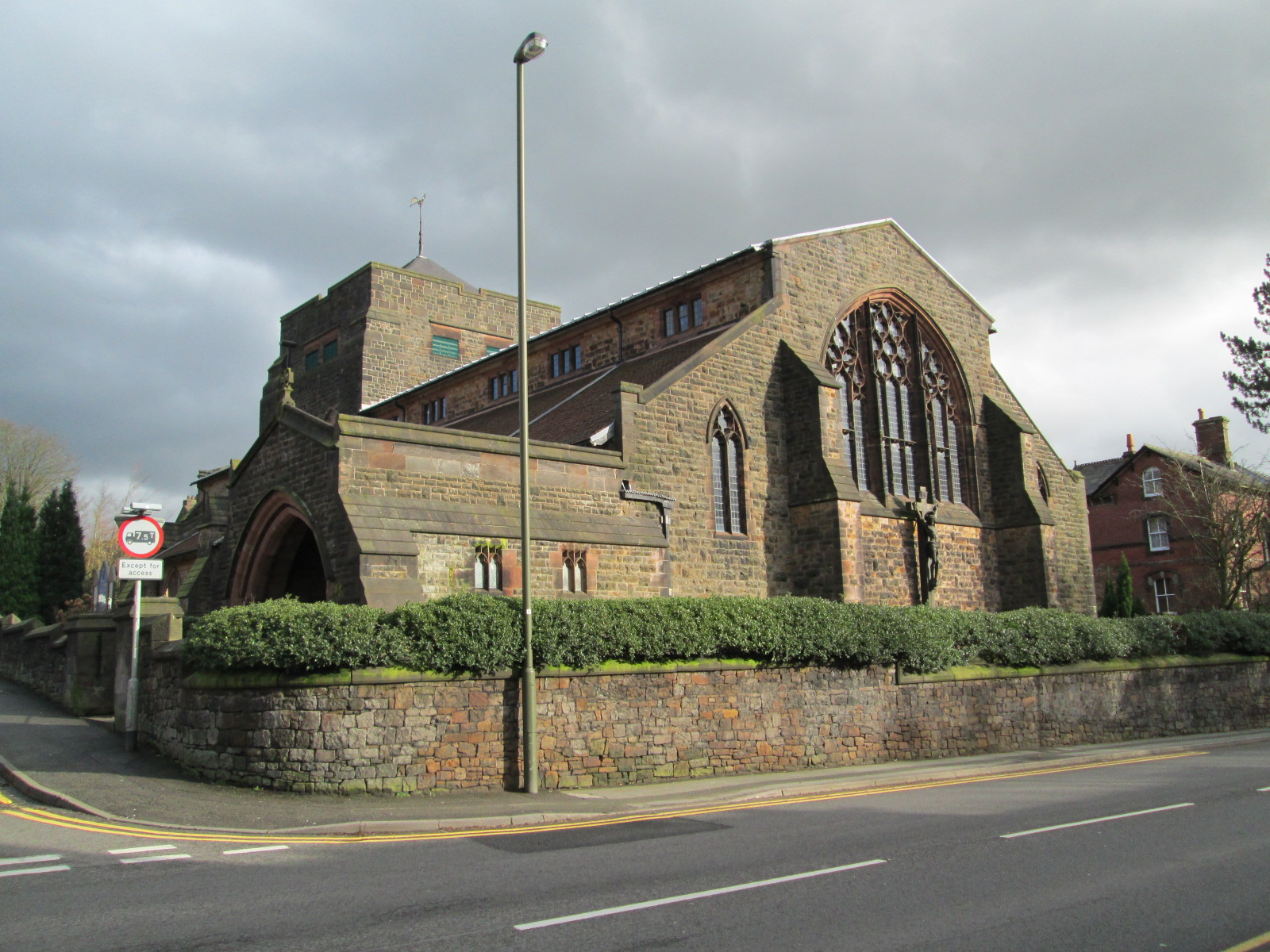
- View from the west
- All Saints' Church, Leek
- 53°6′8″N 2°1′26″W
- OS grid reference: SJ 985 561
- Location: Leek, Staffordshire
- Country: England
- Denomination: Church of England
- Website: http://leekparish.org.uk/churches/all-saints-church/

History
- Consecrated: 1887

Architecture
- Heritage designation: Grade I
- Designated: 13 April 1951
- Architect: Norman Shaw

Administration
- Diocese: Diocese of Lichfield
- Deanery: Leek Deanery

All Saints' Church is an Anglican church in Leek, Staffordshire, England. It is a Grade I listed building. It was designed by Norman Shaw, and built in 1885–1887; the church has stained glass by Morris & Co.

== History ==
An earlier brick-built church in the Compton area of Leek opened in 1863; it was known as Compton Schoolchurch or Christ Church. It was enlarged in 1885.

Joseph Challinor, a Leek solicitor, gave part of the site for a new church in Compton, and contributed nearly one third of the cost. The church was designed by Norman Shaw; he had come to the area in the 1860s to design the new St Matthew's Church in Meerbrook.

The foundation stone of All Saints' was laid in 1885, and the church was consecrated in 1887.

The parish of All Saints was formed in 1889, out of St Luke's and St Edward's. It covered the southern part of the town and Longsdon, a village south-west of Leek. The parishes of St Edward, All Saints and St Luke became the parish of Leek in 1979.

== Details ==
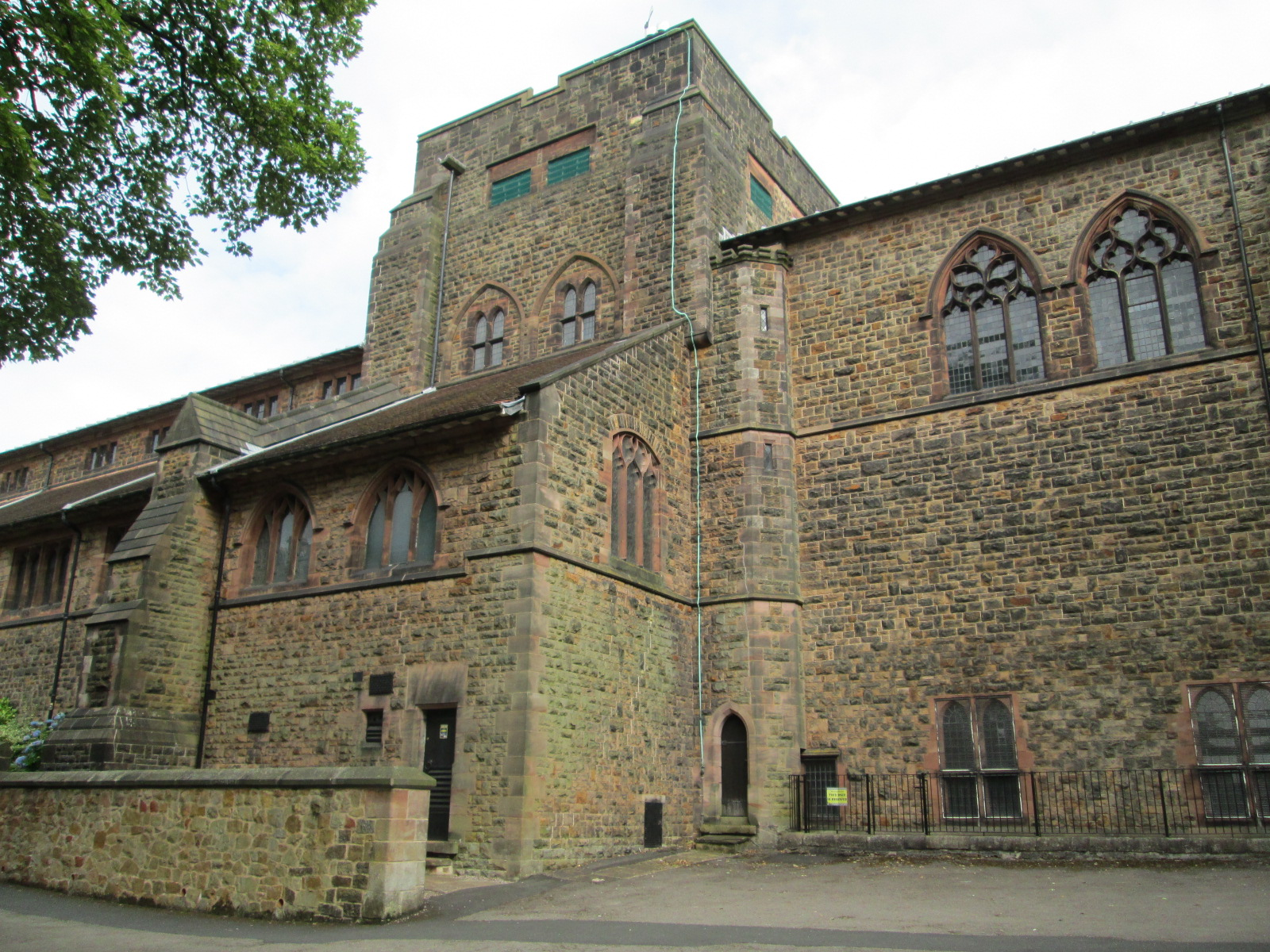
View from the south

The church has a large crossing tower with clasping buttresses. There is a wide nave, of four bays, and a single bay in the crossing. There is a low clerestory. The church being on a sloping site, the vestry is beneath the chancel. There is a deep porch in the north-west, with a wide entrance.

=== Interior ===
Much of the stained glass is by Morris & Co., of which some are to designs of Edward Burne-Jones. The south wall window of the Lady Chapel, and all the painted decorations in the chancel, are by Gerald Horsley.

== See also ==
- Grade I listed churches in Staffordshire
- Listed buildings in Leek, Staffordshire
