= Poulton Abbey =

Monastery in Cheshire, England

Coordinates: 53°07′09″N 2°53′33″W

Poulton Abbey was a Cistercian medieval monastic house in Poulton, Cheshire, England, which was founded between 1153 and 1158, and moved in 1214 to a site near Leek, Staffordshire, where it became Dieulacres Abbey. The original site became a grange estate of the abbey, and the chapel at the site was used as a one-room local church. In 1487 the abbey leased the estate to the prominent Manley family and the chapel was expanded to include a nave, chancel, and tower for use as its private chapel. By the 16th century all abbey buildings had been lost, though the site of the chapel was noted on a 17th-century estate map and later on the first Ordnance Survey map (1823).

Archaeological investigations commenced in 1995, first as a joint project of Chester Archaeology and Liverpool University, and later as an independent project – the Poulton Research Project. The chapel was first excavated and just over 800 burials have so far (2015) been excavated. Evaluation trenches and geophysical investigations have also found an extensive Iron Age settlement and Roman landscape. The main monastic compound has not been found.

On 20–23 June 2006, the archaeological television programme Time Team did an evaluation of a site known as Poulton Hall to the north of the chapel site to determine whether it might be the site of the Abbey buildings. The investigation determined that the site was probably the location of the grange buildings, but not the Abbey itself.

It was theorised by Professor Mick Aston that the chapel was a capella ad portam, or a chapel by the gate – for the use of the local population who would not have had access to the abbey chapel.
