= Westwood College, Leek =

Westwood College
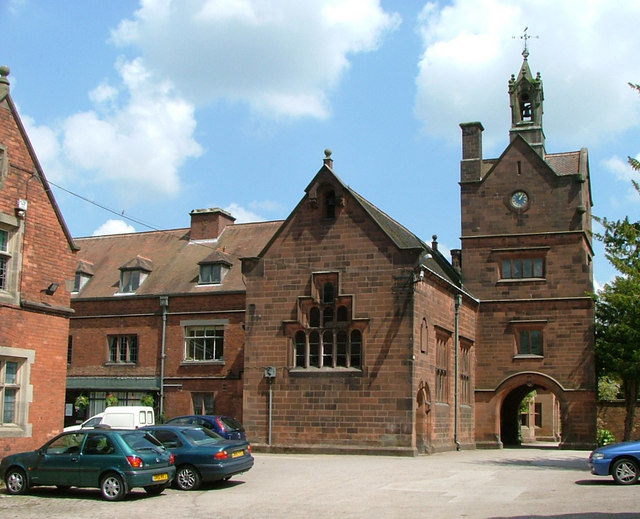

Location
- Westwood Park; Leek; Staffordshire, ST13 8NP; England; 53.10369°N 2.05207°W

Information
- Type: Academy
- Local authority: Staffordshire
- Department for Education URN: 142755 Tables
- Ofsted: Reports
- Gender: Mixed
- Age: 13 to 18
- Website: https://wwc.ttlt.org.uk

Westwood College, formerly known as Westwood High School is a mixed upper school located in Leek, Staffordshire, England. Westwood is set in the grounds of Westwood Hall, an old manor house built in the 17th century, once lived in by the Davenport family, famous Stoke-on-Trent potters. The house was built over an existing house that is said to have belonged to one of Henry VIII's favourite Knights, Francis Talbot.

== History ==
Westwood is divided into two parts known as 'Old Hall', the old manor house, and New 'Hall', opened in 1963 accompanied by a house of the same type of architecture. 'Old Hall' consists of the stables, caretaker's house, four mobiles, summerhouse, sixth form cafeteria, English block and the manor house itself. Westwood was extended largely in the 1980s to house the new science block, formerly in New Hall where the art and design department now resides. New Hall consists of the 1960s building and the bungalow.

Aside from the numerous different architectural builds in Westwood College, there are woods, a bus park, cafeteria gardens, an AstroTurf football pitch, four tennis courts, fields, lawns, sports field and a Victorian garden. This garden was restored in 2005 by the Peak District back to its former glory. The original well and fountain remain but are now fenced off to prevent students falling in.

=== Grammar school ===
The school was the Westwood Hall Girls' High School, a girls' grammar school.

=== Comprehensive ===
It was previously a foundation school administered by Staffordshire County Council, and specialising in both Modern Languages and Visual Arts. However, in April 2016 Westwood College was converted to academy status. The school continues to coordinate with Staffordshire County Council for admissions.

== Notable former pupils ==
- Anna Bebington, British Olympic rower
- Tom Levitt, Labour MP from 1997 to 2010 for High Peak.
- Lee Pearson, Paralympic Equestrian Gold-medallist
- Jessica Sylvester, swimmer in the 2008 Summer Olympics

=== Westwood Hall Girls' High School ===
- Dame Averil Cameron, Warden from 1994 to 2020 of Keble College, Oxford, and a former professor of Late Antique and Byzantine History
