= Davenport Pottery =

19th-century English pottery manufacturer

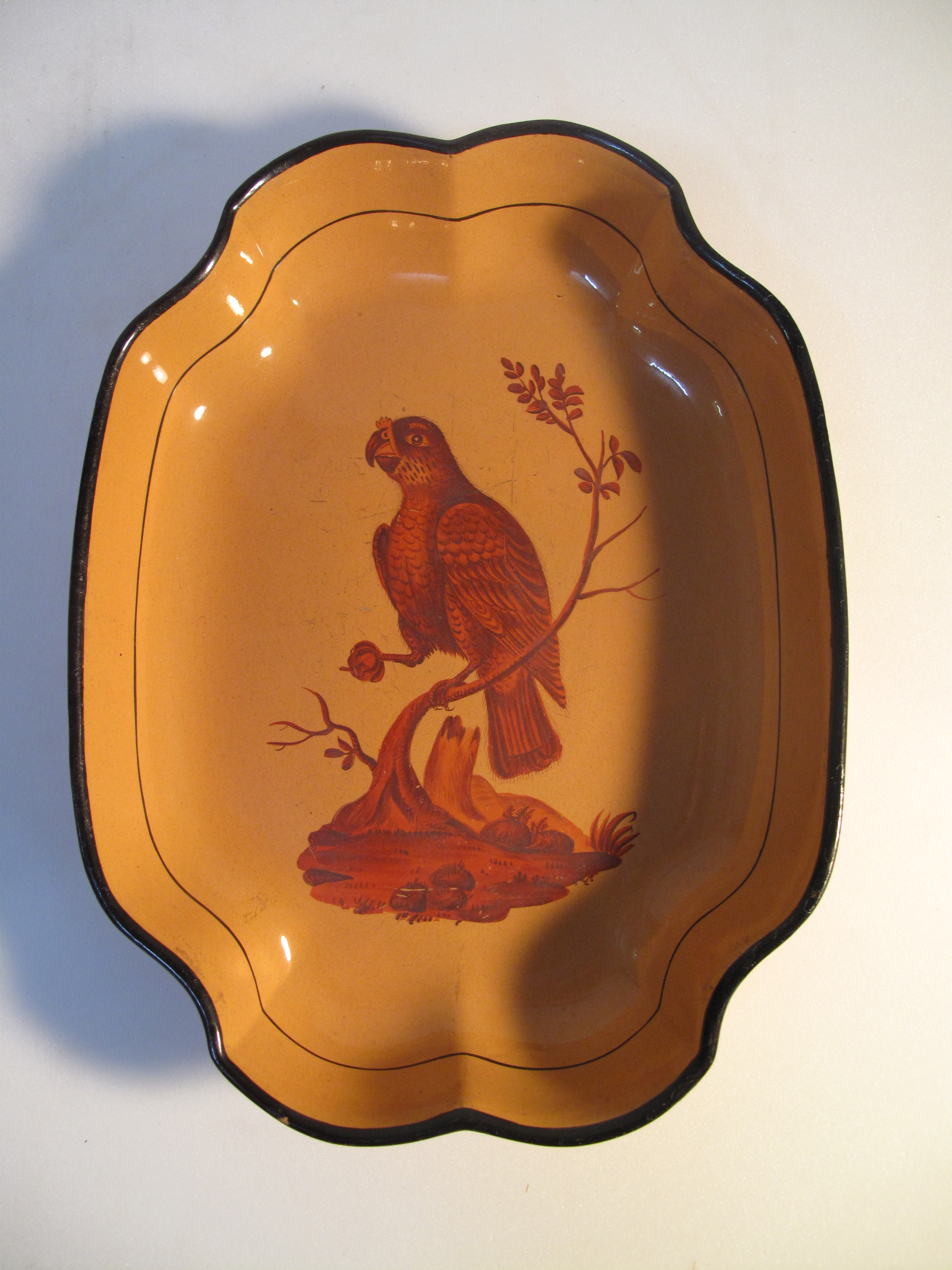
Dish with parrot, c. 1795

Davenport Pottery was an English earthenware and porcelain manufacturer based in Longport, Staffordshire. It was in business, owned and run by the Davenport family, between 1794 and 1887, making mostly tablewares in the main types of Staffordshire pottery.

== History ==
In 1785, John Davenport began as a potter working with Thomas Wolfe of Stoke. In 1794, he acquired his own pottery at Longport and began producing cream-coloured blue and white transfer-printed earthenware. In 1801 he began making glass, and by 1805 he was making porcelain and stone china as well. By September 1806 the quality of his porcelain wares was such that the Prince of Wales, later to become King George IV, ordered services of the finest and most valuable kinds.

John retired in 1830 and his sons, William and Henry, carried on the firm. Henry died in 1835 and the firm became William Davenport and Company. William died in 1869. The firm continued under William’s two sons till 1887 when the factory was closed. In 1887 Davenport was acquired by Burleigh Pottery.

A book of 1843 said the firm had three works in Longport and another one at Newport, this making earthenware, and altogether had over 1,500 workers. All wares were of very good quality for their type. From around 1860 most wares were porcelain.

The landscape artist James Holland (1800–1872) was employed, from the age of 12, for 7 years as a flower painter at the Longport works. His father and other members of the family were also employed there.

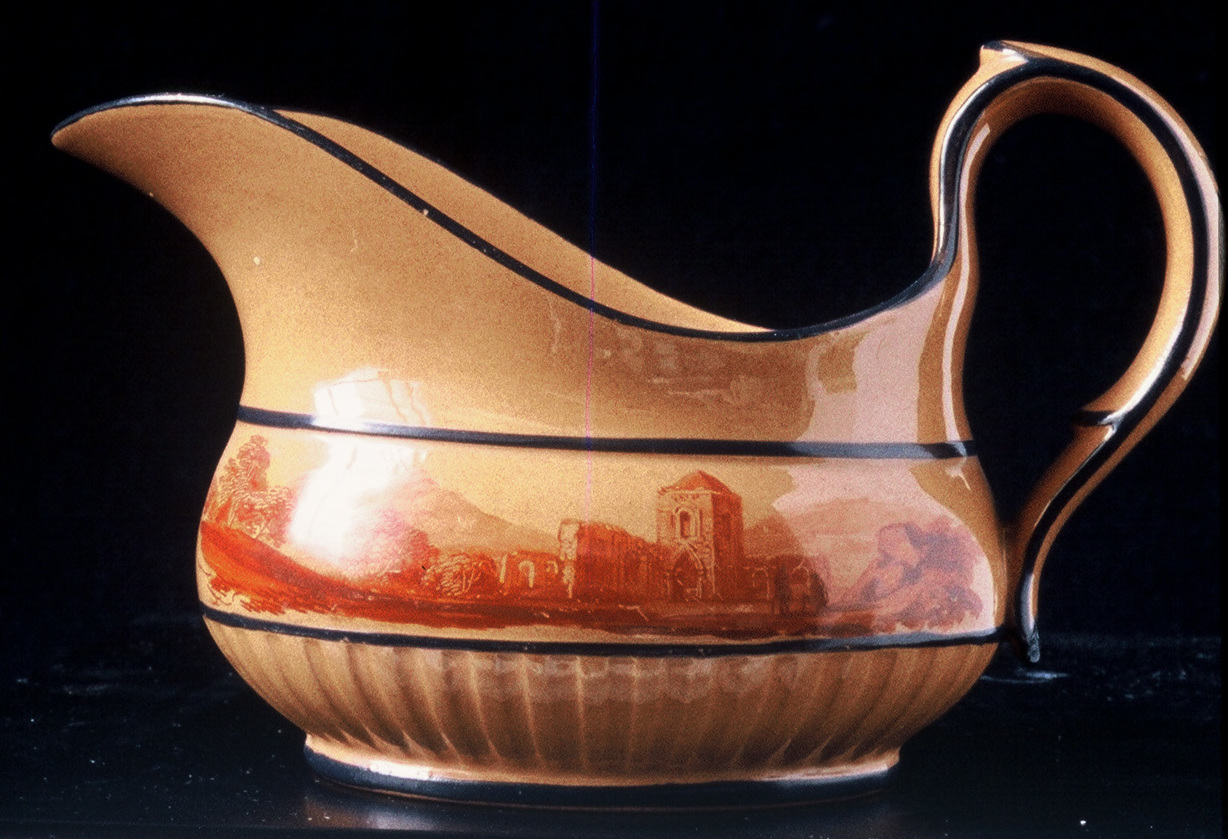
Jug with landscape, c. 1795

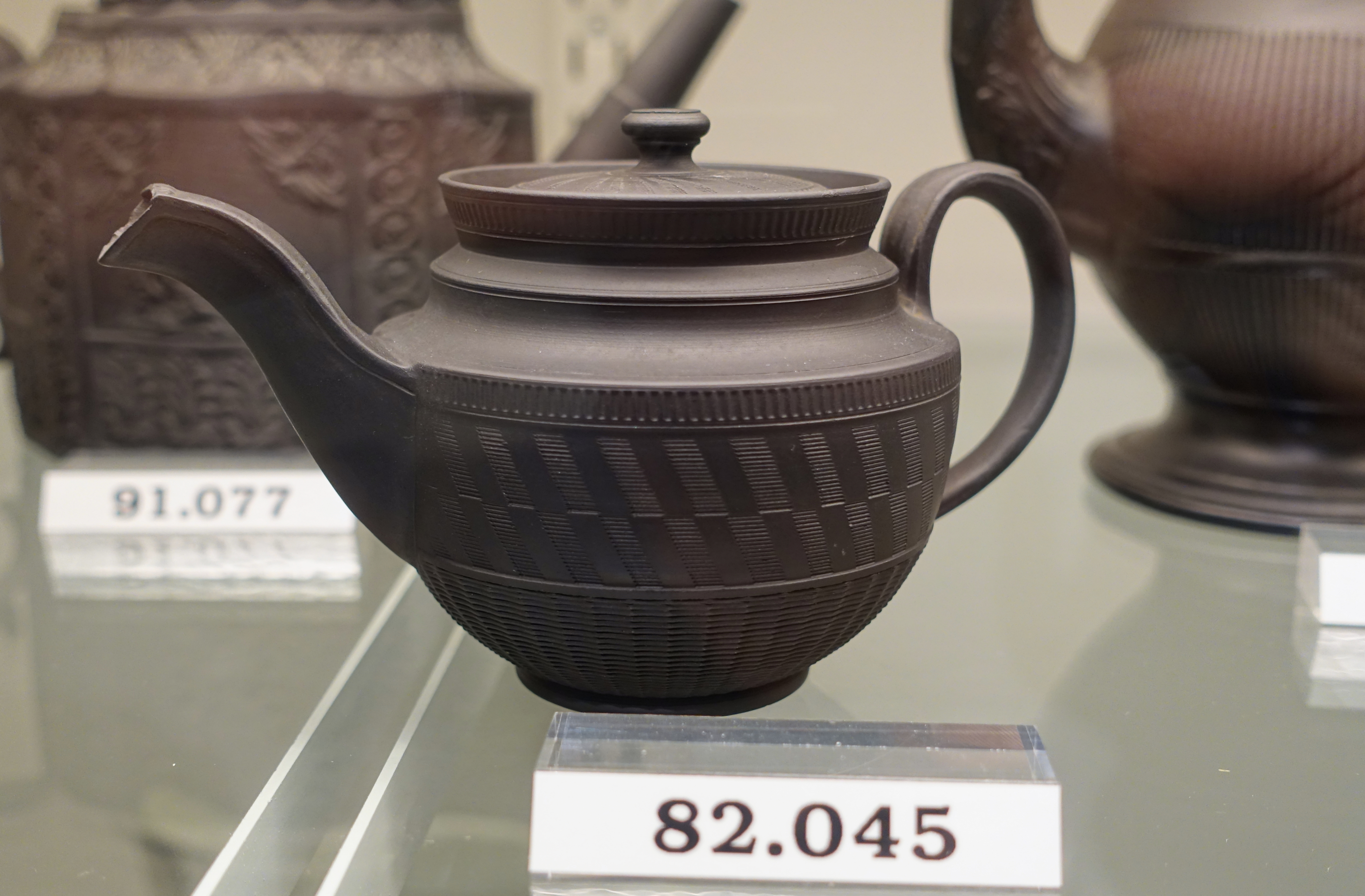
Teapot attributed to Davenport, c. 1820, black basalt stoneware

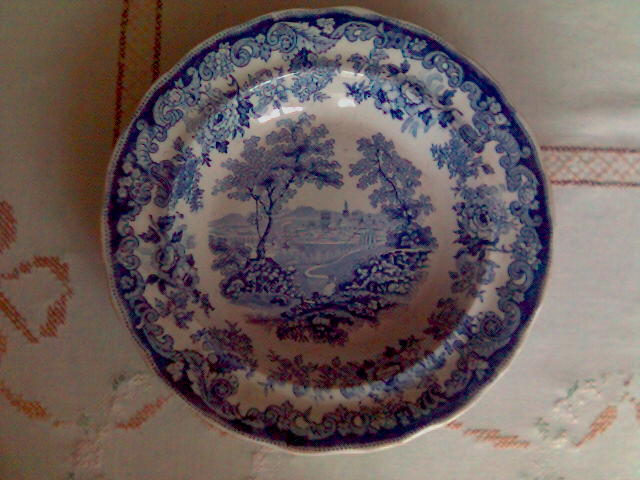
Blue and white transfer-printed plate

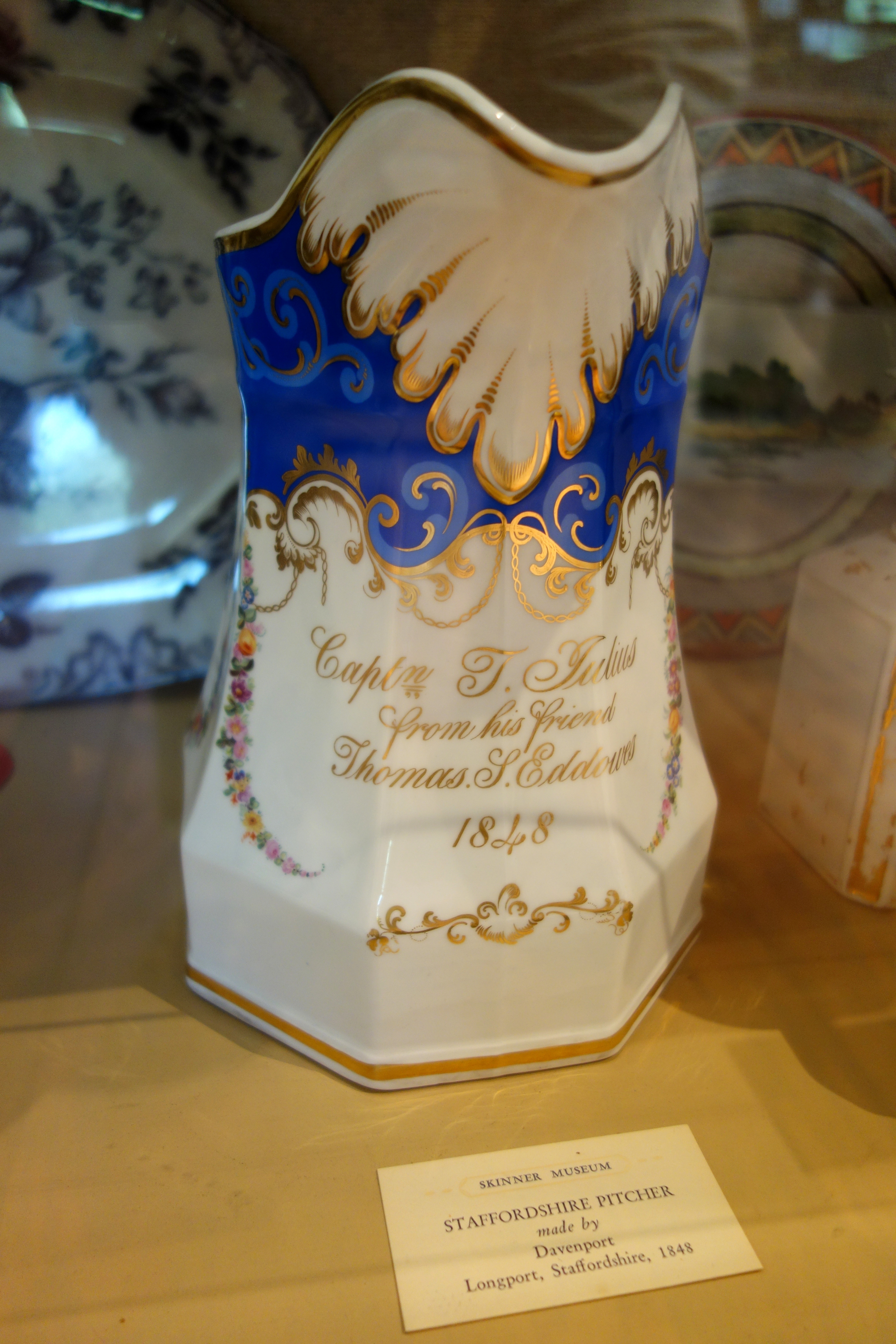
Pitcher with inscription 'Captn T. Julius from his friend Thomas S. Eddowes, 1848'

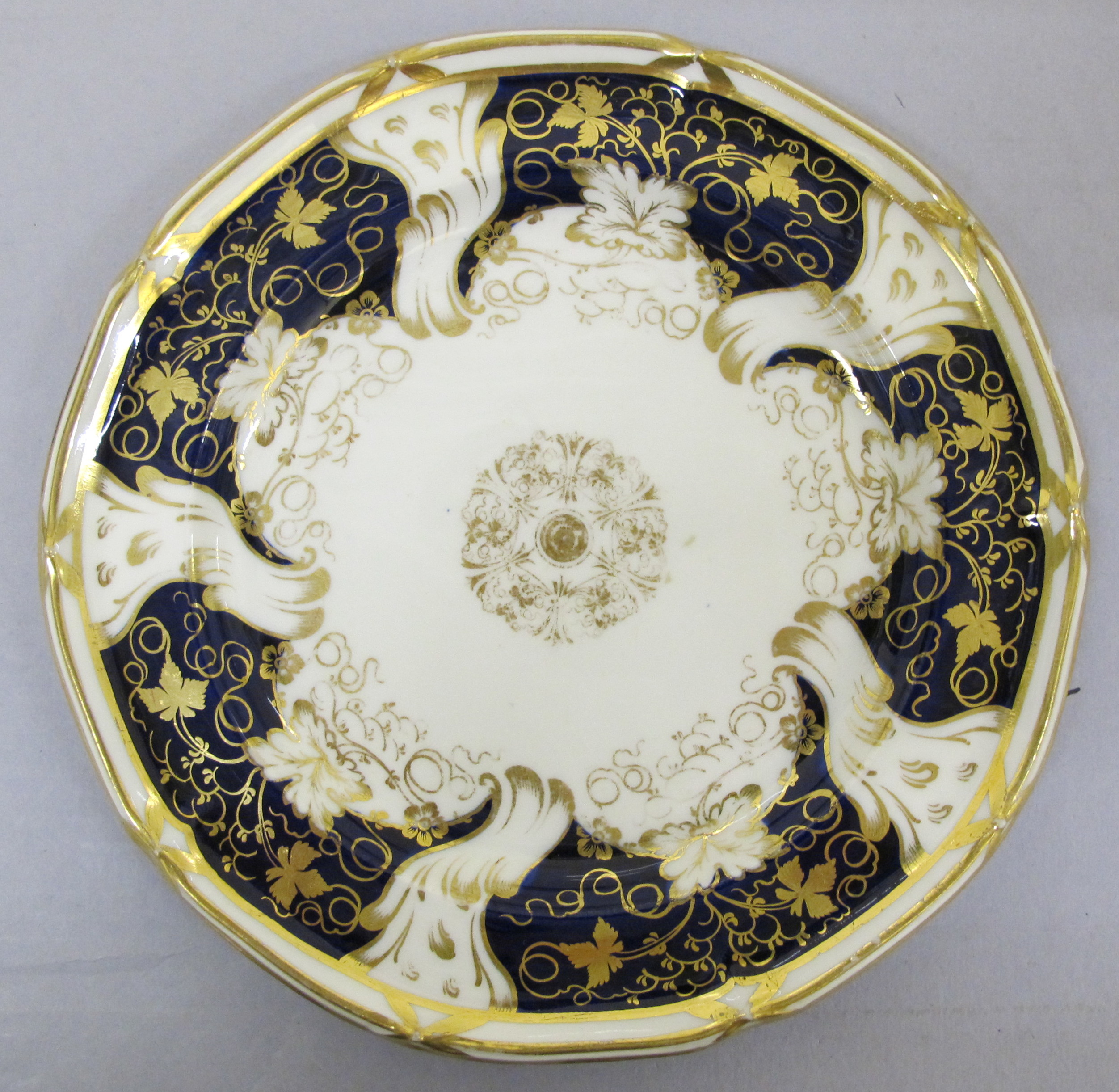
Plate

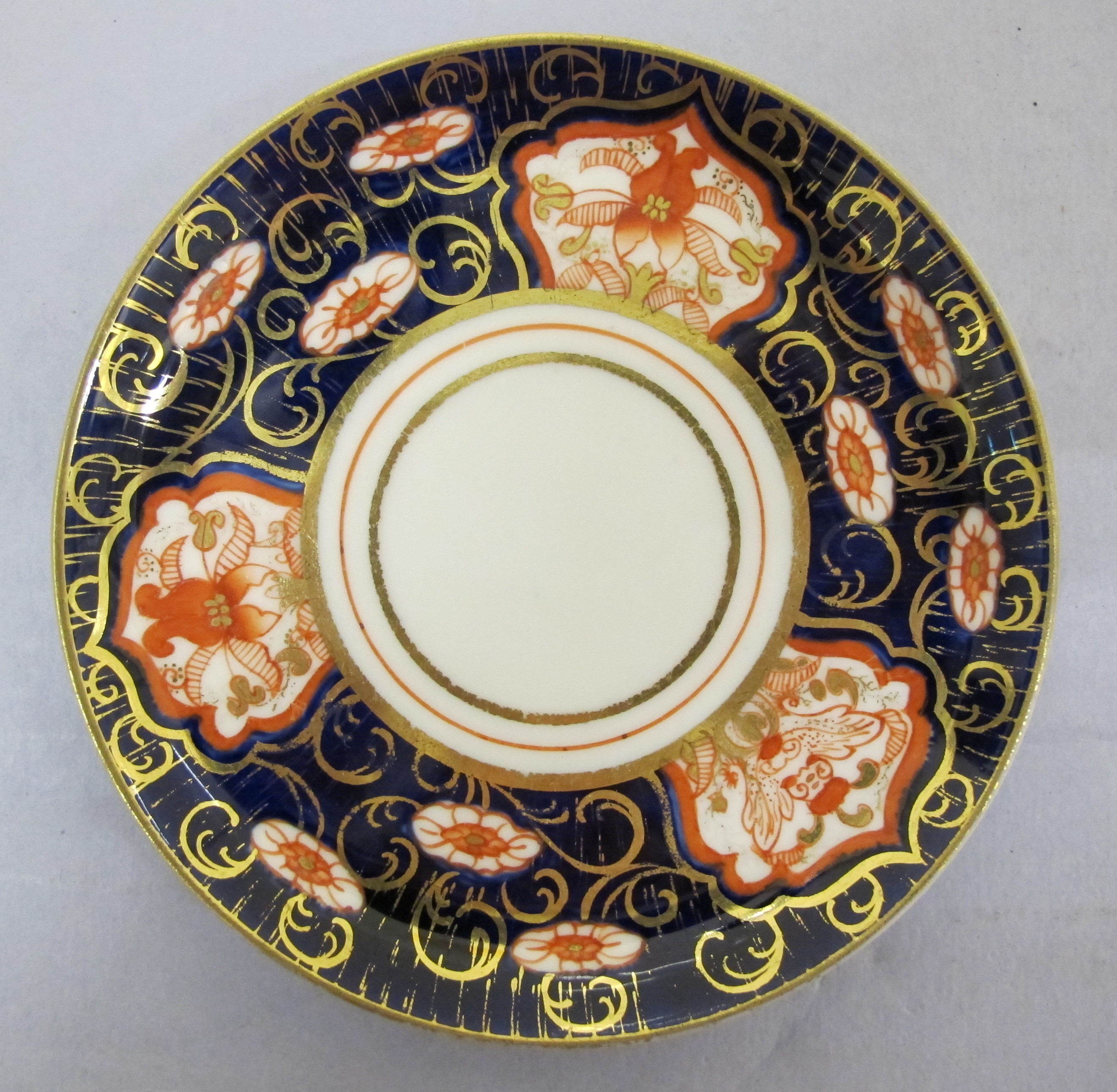
Saucer, c. 1880

== See also ==
- Thomas Maddock
