= Poulton, Cheshire =

Former civil parish in Cheshire, England

Coordinates: 53.123°N 2.905°W

Poulton
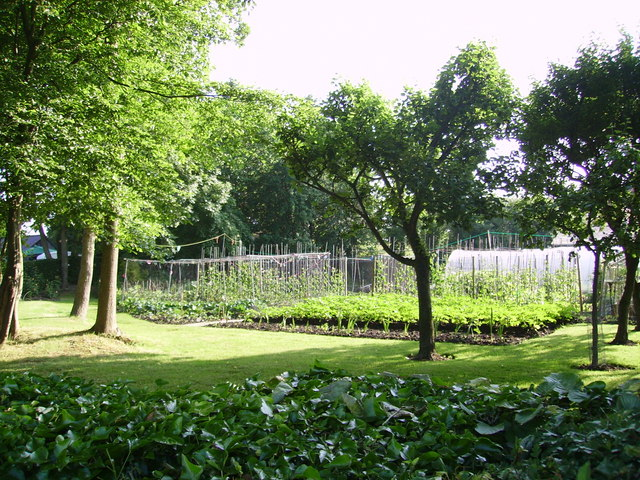
- Kitchen garden in Poulton

- Location within Cheshire
- Population: 92 (2001)
- OS grid reference: SJ3959
- Civil parish: Poulton and Pulford
- Unitary authority: Cheshire West and Chester
- Ceremonial county: Cheshire
- Region: North West
- Country: England
- Sovereign state: United Kingdom
- Post town: CHESTER
- Postcode district: CH4
- Dialling code: 01244
- Police: Cheshire
- Fire: Cheshire
- Ambulance: North West
- UK Parliament: Chester South and Eddisbury

Poulton is a settlement and former civil parish, now in the parish of Poulton and Pulford, in the Cheshire West and Chester, in the ceremonial county of Cheshire, England. In 2001 census the parish had a recorded population of 92.

Since 1995, significant archaeological activity has been conducted in the area, first by the University of Liverpool and later by the independent group known as the Poulton Research Project.

== History ==
Archaeological research has established there has been human habitation in the area since the Mesolithic period (8,000 B.C.). In the Sub-Roman Britain period, Iron Age roundhouse ditches, Briquetage and animal bones have also been found suggesting the area was once an important site for the processing and preserving of meat for trading. Roman finds include ditches, domestic ceramics and building materials relating to the Legio XX Valeria Victrix that was garrisoned at the nearby legionary fortress of Deva Victrix (Chester).

During the medieval period, Poulton Chapel was an important monastic site that was founded by the Cistercian monks of Poulton Abbey in the mid 12th century. Although it is believed to have been a substantial site, only a small amount of ground level masonry survives.

Until 1919 the village was part of the Grosvenor Estate administered from nearby Eaton Hall. Several of the buildings in the former parish were commissed by Hugh Grosvenor, 1st Duke of Westminster, and designed by Douglas and Fordham, a well-known Cheshire architects' practice.

In 1870–72, John Marius Wilson described the settlement in the Imperial Gazetteer of England and Wales as:

POULTON, a township in Pulford parish, Cheshire; on an affluent of the river Dee, 4¼ miles S of Chester. Acres, 1, 391. Real property, £1, 723. Pop., 132. Houses, 22. A Cistertian abbey was founded here, in 1153, by Robert Pincerna; and was removed, in 1220, to Dieulacres in Staffordshire.

During the Second World War, the RAF established RAF Poulton to the northwest of the settlement. The base was used to train pilots flying Hawker Hurricanes. Much of wartime airfield's runway, perimeter track, and aircraft hardstandings remain.

== Governance ==
Poulton was formerly a township in the parish of Pulford, in 1866 Poulton became a civil parish, on 1 April 2015 the parish was abolished and merged with Pulford to form "Poulton and Pulford".

== See also ==
- Listed buildings in Poulton, Cheshire
