= Dieulacres Abbey =

English monastery

Coordinates: 53°07′05″N 2°01′36″W

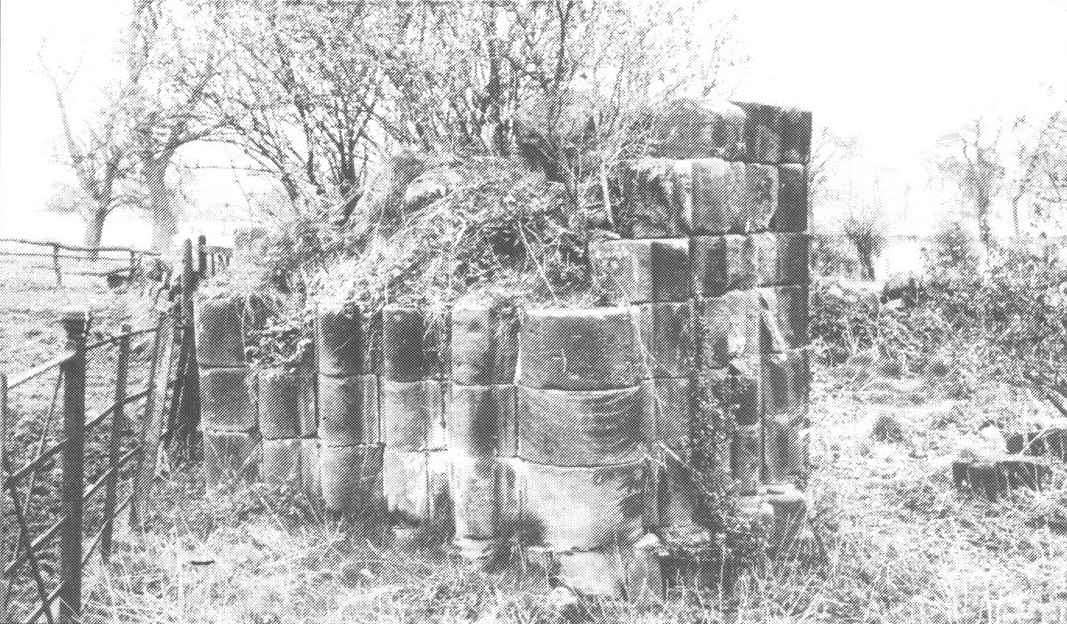
Former Dieulacres Abbey: one of the four pillars of the belfry located above the transept crossing. Photo taken looking east.

Dieulacres Abbey was a Cistercian monastery established by Ranulf, Earl of Chester at Poulton in Cheshire. It moved to the present site at Abbey Green near Leek, Staffordshire in 1214, possibly in part as a result from raids at the former site by Welsh marauders.

== History ==
The name means 'may God increase it,' and is derived from the purported exclamation of the wife of Ranulf, when he informed her of a dream in which he was requested to move the abbey from Poulton by his deceased grandfather. After his death his heart was removed and buried within the abbey, and his body elsewhere; which now seems unusual but appears to have been a common custom during much of the medieval period.

During the 13th century there were numerous disputes with other monasteries in the area, such as Croxden Abbey and Trentham Priory, regarding the access and ownership of land, especially pastureland, and of the collection of tithes. These problems seem to have been eventually resolved without any of the aggressive clashes sometimes noted under similar circumstances elsewhere. The abbey was the second greatest monastic land owner in the county, after Burton-on-Trent Abbey.

There were more difficulties in the 14th century, with the abbey being seized by the Crown in 1339 due to the accusation that “the abbey had been acquired in defiance of the Statutes of Mortmain,” though the abbot was quickly able to prove otherwise.

== Marauding ==
Royal grants of protection were offered to the abbey later in the 14th century however, it is also known that the monastery was often the source of problems in the area as the abbot maintained an 'armed band.' A royal commission in 1379 noted that the Abbot of Dieulacres, in order to control the area, had used these armed men, 'to do all the mischief they can to the people in the county of Stafford and that they have lain in wait for them, assaulted, maimed, and killed some, and driven others from place to place...' In 1380 the abbot himself was arrested and imprisoned following an incident during which a John de Wharton was beheaded by these men at the orders of the abbot. Amazingly, he was soon pardoned and released. In subsequent years members of the community were accused of theft and the abbot criticized for appearing to protect them. There were also numerous lawsuits. In 1517, Abbot William Albion and eight of the monks were charged with being involved in a major riot in Leek with the purpose of preventing the arrest of an abbey steward for murder. Even the abbot was witnessed in use of a bow! He was deposed, as was his successor.

The last abbot, Thomas Whitney was known to have violently abused abbey tenants and was possibly involved in fraud whilst actually accusing a former incumbent of such.

== The Dissolution and beyond ==
The abbey was surrendered in 1538 and much of the contents were sold off within days of the closure. The site was granted to Sir Ralph Bagnall.

In his history of Dieulacres, Michael J. Fisher mentions that some time after the accession of Elizabeth I the abbey site passed from the Bagnall family into the hands of the Rudyard family, and it was probably they who built the present Abbey Farm early in the seventeenth century.

Since then, Dieulacres has passed through the hands of many families, none of whom settled there for very long. It is said that at one time it was used to pay off a heavy debt incurred at the gaming tables, and its history since 1538 seems to have been a troubled and unhappy one.

The only in-situ remains above ground are of bases of two of the massive piers (columns) of the crossing tower and a stone coffin. The remainder of the ruins had been demolished before 1820, and much of the stone used in nearby farm buildings and other structures, and evidently includes many carved stones.

== See also ==
- Abbeys and priories in England
- Listed buildings in Leek, Staffordshire
