= Arthur Hulme =

English footballer (1877–1916)

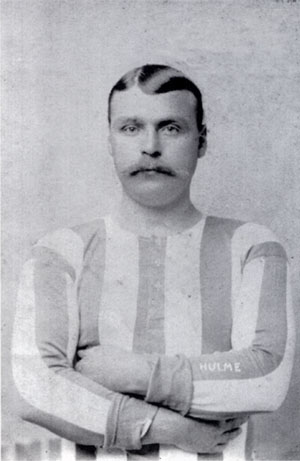
- Pictured c. 1905

Personal information
- Full name: Joseph Arthur Hulme
- Date of birth: 18 December 1877
- Place of birth: Leek, England
- Date of death: 3 October 1916 (aged 38)
- Place of death: Gueudecourt, France
- Positions: Inside right; right back

Senior career*
Years	Team	Apps	(Gls)
1896–1897	Macclesfield	12	(4)
1897–1898	Lincoln City	29	(12)
1898–1899	Gravesend United		
1899–190?	Wellingborough		
190?–1902	Bristol Rovers		
1902–1908	Brighton & Hove Albion	159	(6)
1908–1910	Macclesfield	29	(9)
- * Club domestic league appearances and goals

Joseph Arthur Hulme (18 December 1877 – 3 October 1916) was an English footballer who scored 12 goals from 29 appearances in the Football League playing for Lincoln City. He also played in the Southern League for Gravesend United, Bristol Rovers and Brighton & Hove Albion, and in the Midland League for Wellingborough. He began his career as an inside right, and in later years played at right back.

Hulme was killed in action in the First World War.

== Biography ==
Hulme was born in Leek, Staffordshire, and began his career in junior football in the local area, playing as an inside forward. He signed for Lincoln City in June 1897, and made his first-team debut on 4 September, the opening day of the 1897–98 Football League season, in the Second Division match away at Newton Heath. Lincoln lost 5–0. He played regularly, scoring 13 goals from 31 appearances in all competitions, 12 from 29 in the League, but was released at the end of the season.

Hulme and a Lincoln teammate, goalkeeper William Wilkinson, were two of numerous new signings for Gravesend United for the 1898–99 Southern League season. Neither was retained for the following campaign. The club's committee was keen to dispense with the services of "the men with drinking reputations, who proved such failures last season", though there is no indication that Hulme was one such. He played for Midland League club Wellingborough before returning to the Southern League with Bristol Rovers in 1901–02.

Hulme signed for Brighton & Hove Albion ahead of their second season in the Southern League. His profile in Carder and Harris's Albion A–Z describes him as highly influential in Brighton's successful campaign for promotion to the First Division, and, playing in defence, he missed only one match in their first campaign at the higher level. In 1904–05, he played more frequently for the reserves than for the first team, though he did replace the injured centre-half Micky Good for the high-profile FA Cup tie against his former club Bristol Rovers. Albion lost 2–1, and the winning Rovers players were presented with gold medals in honour of their victory.

At the end of that season, Hulme was one of only three players retained by Albion. He was appointed captain, and contributed to their reaching the last 32 of the 1905–06 FA Cup, in which they lost to Football League First Division club Middlesbrough only after two replays; according to the Daily Mirror's match report, Hulme played splendidly. By 1907 he was again primarily a reserve, standing in when Arthur Archer was unavailable. In recognition of his five years' service to the club, he became the first Albion player to be awarded a benefit match. The chosen match was the Western League fixture against Southampton, but the weather was extremely wet and the attendance was reported as "barely two thousand". He played only one first-team match in 1908–09, and retired at the end of the season, having scored 7 goals from 174 appearances for Albion in first-team competition. He then returned to his native Leek when he re-signed for Macclesfield. He later became trainer of local team Leek United, probably from the 1909–10 season as he only made two appearances for Macclesfield during that season having been almost ever-present during the 1908–09 season.

Hulme enlisted in the Royal Sussex Regiment at the start of the First World War. He was serving as a corporal in the 7th Battalion at the time of his death in action in October 1916 at Gueudecourt, in the Somme department of France. He is commemorated on the Thiepval Memorial and on the Nicholson War Memorial in Leek.
