= William Wilkinson (footballer) =

English footballer

Personal information
- Position: Goalkeeper

Senior career*
Years	Team	Apps	(Gls)
1894–189?	Rotherham Town	9	(0)
189?–1897	South Shore		
1897–1898	Lincoln City	20	(0)
1898	Chatham		
1898–1899	Gravesend United		
- * Club domestic league appearances and goals

William H. Wilkinson was an English footballer who made 29 appearances in the Football League playing for Rotherham Town and Lincoln City in the 1890s. A goalkeeper, he also played non-league football for South Shore, Chatham and Gravesend United.

== Football career ==
Wilkinson was the regular reserve-team goalkeeper for Rotherham Town during the 1894–95 season, but did make his debut in the Football League for the club during that campaign. He was retained for the following season, as backup for Arthur Wharton, and was in goal for the club's record league defeat, 10–1 away to Liverpool in the Second Division in February 1896. The Liverpool Mercury reported that in the latter part of the match, already nine goals to the bad, "Wilkinson, whose play hitherto had been of a very wishy-washy character, was cheered for several fine clearances". He moved on to Lancashire League club South Shore, and from there back to the Second Division with Lincoln City.

Lincoln City gave first starts to Wilkinson, Fred Howard and William Ross on 8 November 1897 at home to Newton Heath. Despite being reduced to ten men for a time because of injury to Thomas Eyre, Lincoln won 1–0. Wilkinson played regularly until the end of the season, but was not kept on.

He and Lincoln teammates Arthur Hulme and William Ross were three of numerous new signings for Gravesend United for the 1898–99 Southern League season. When Gravesend lost 5–2 away to Bristol City in a Southern League fixture in February 1899, the Bristol Mercury and Daily Post wrote that "Wilkinson had plenty to do and he did his work brilliantly". None of the three was retained for the following campaign. The club's committee was keen to dispense with the services of "the men with drinking reputations, who proved such failures last season", though there is no indication that any of the three came into that category.
