= Leek, Staffordshire =

Town in Staffordshire, England

Coordinates: 53.107°N 2.021°W

Leek
- Town
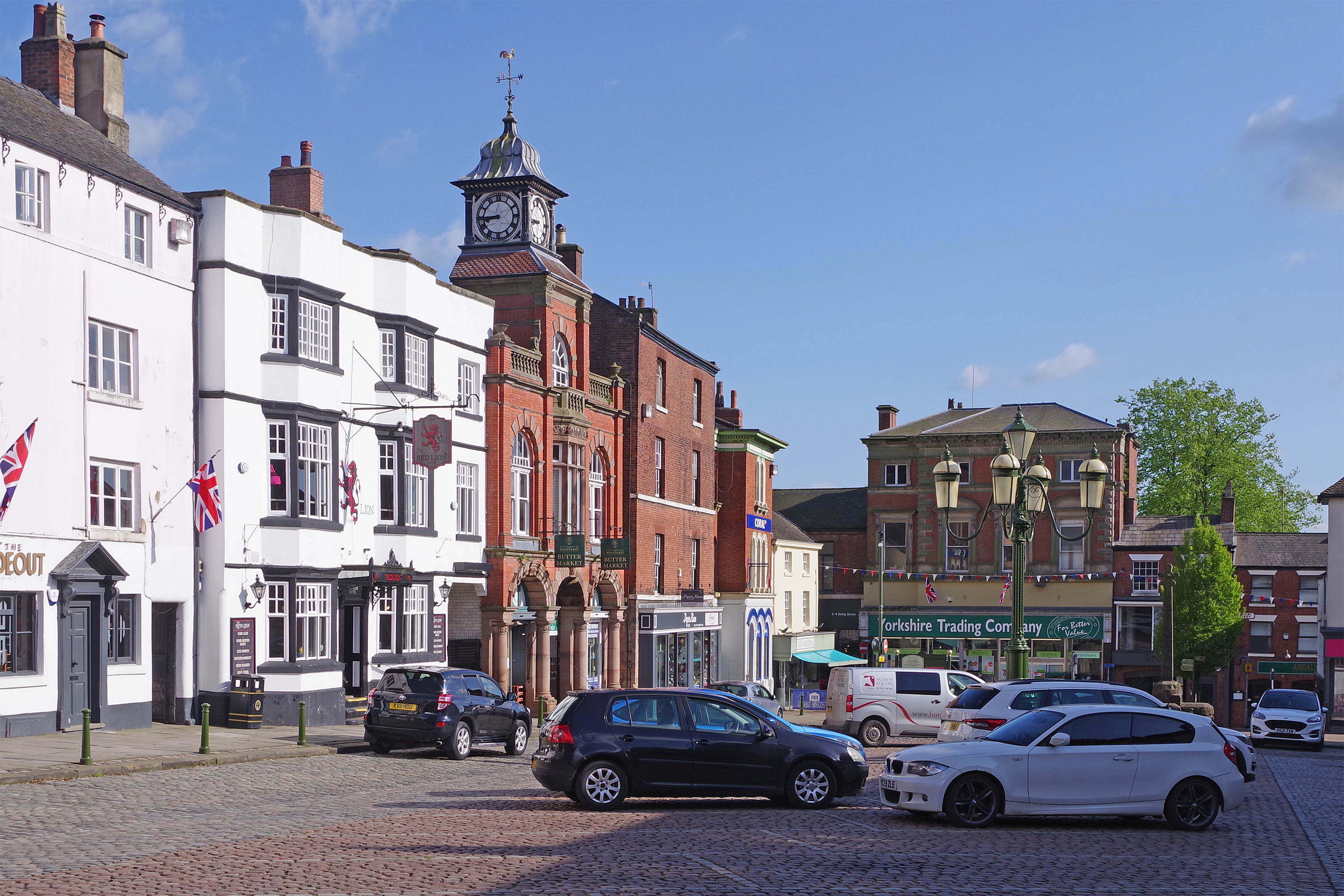
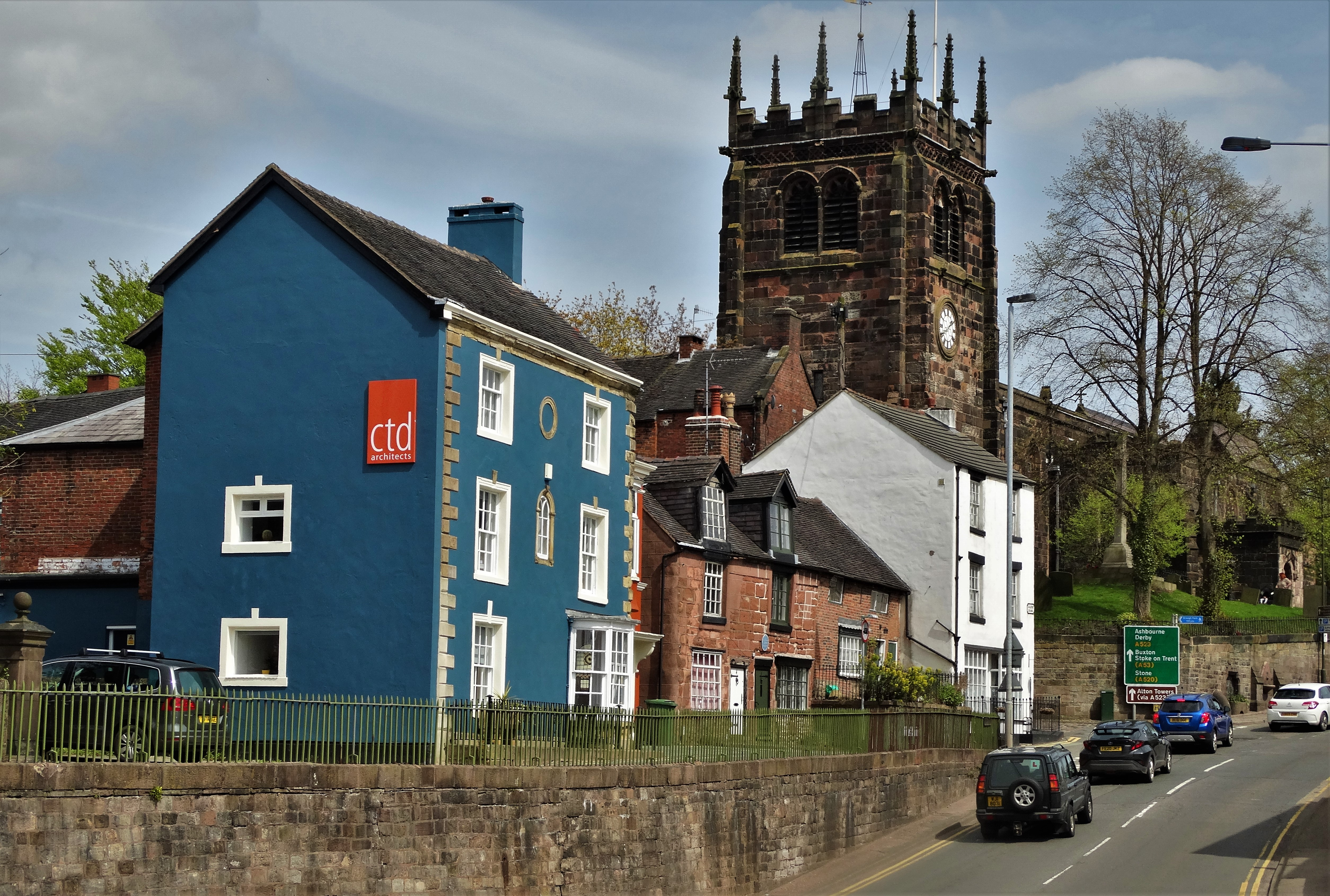
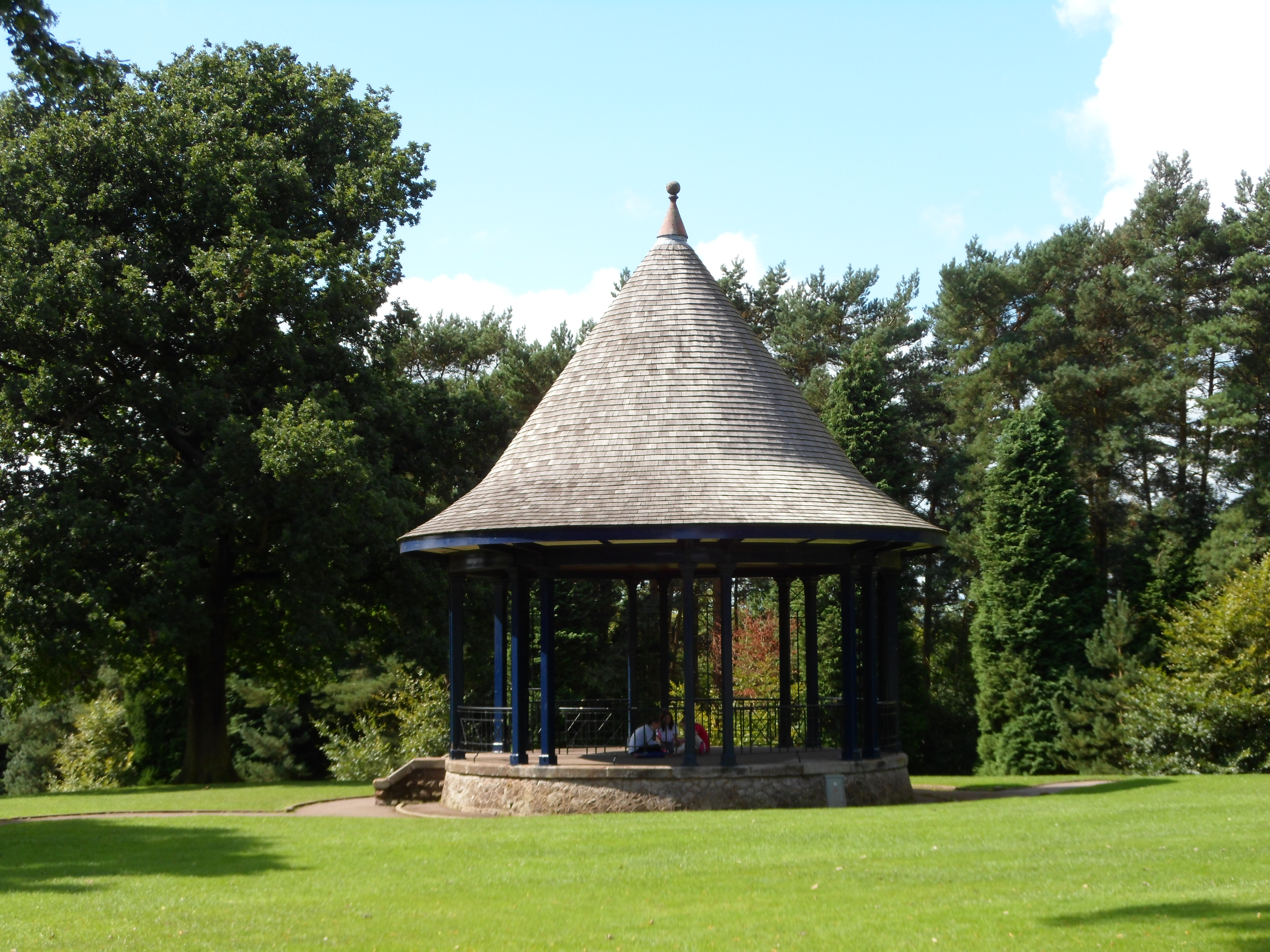
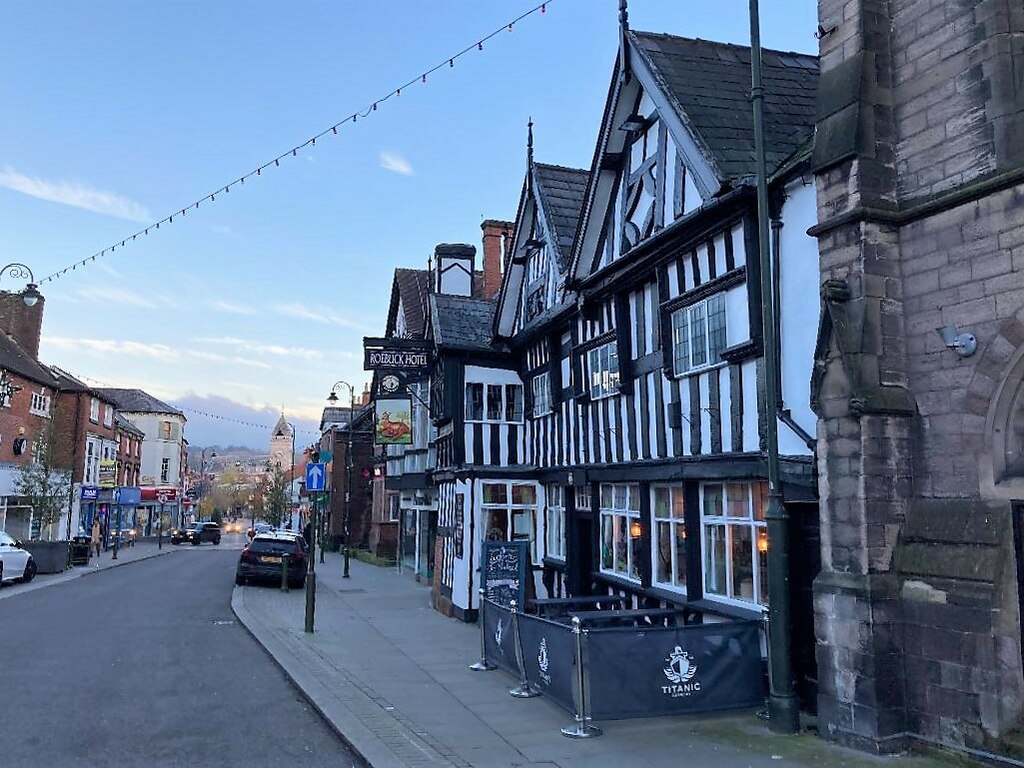
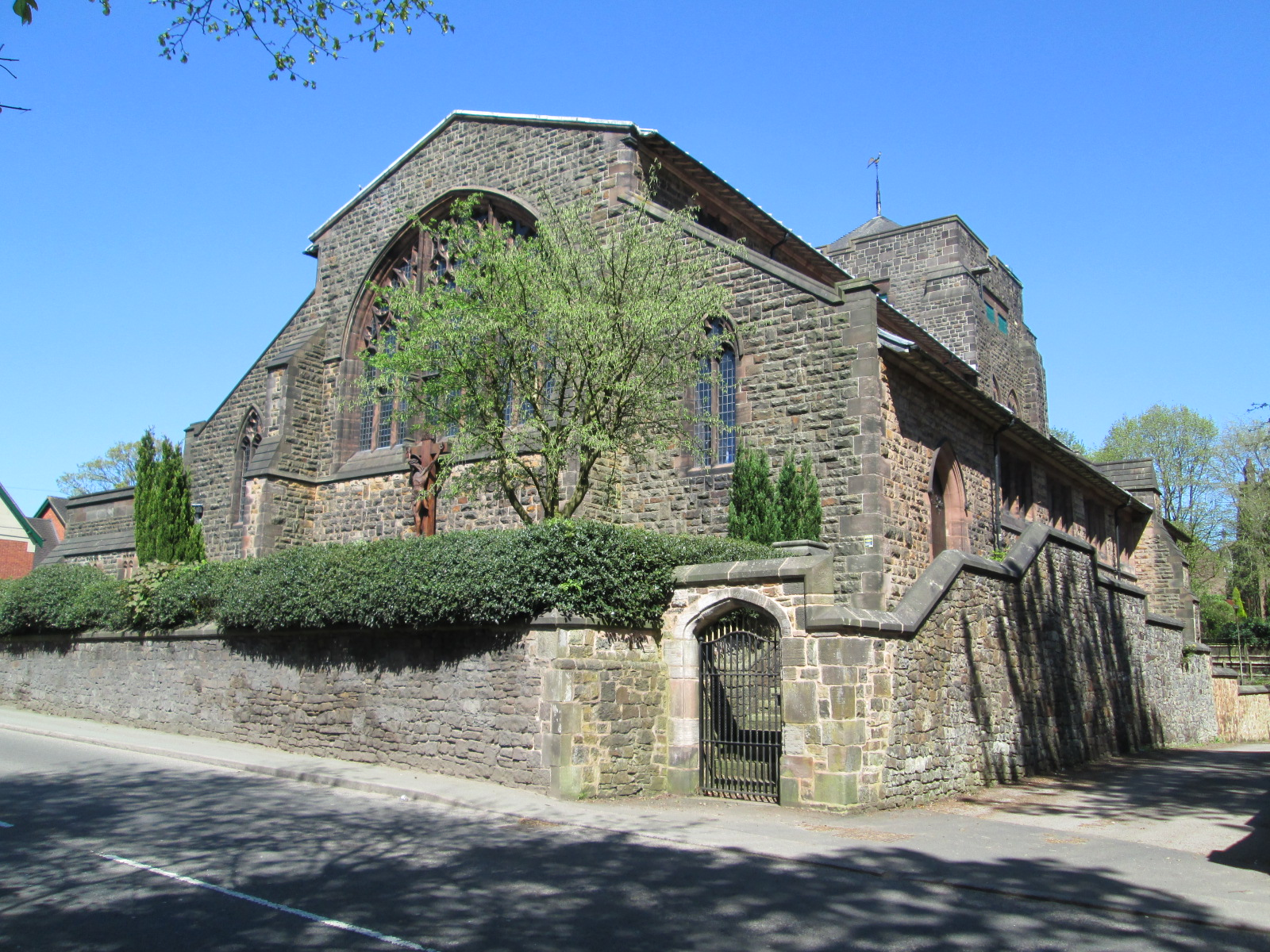
- Market Square St Edward’s Church Brough Park Derby Street All Saints' Church

- Location within Staffordshire
- Population: 19,385 (2021 Census)
- OS grid reference: SJ984565
- Civil parish: Leek
- District: Staffordshire Moorlands
- Shire county: Staffordshire
- Region: West Midlands
- Country: England
- Sovereign state: United Kingdom
- Suburbs of the town: List: Ball Haye Green; Barnfields; Bridge End; Haregate; Wallbridge Park; Westwood; Woodcroft
- Post town: LEEK
- Postcode district: ST13
- Dialling code: 01538
- Police: Staffordshire
- Fire: Staffordshire
- Ambulance: West Midlands
- UK Parliament: Staffordshire Moorlands
- Website: https://leektowncouncil.gov.uk/

Leek is a market town and civil parish in the Staffordshire Moorlands District of Staffordshire, England. The town lies on the River Churnet, 10 miles (16 km) north east of Stoke-on-Trent. In 2021, it had a population of 19,385.

Leek is an ancient borough and was granted its royal charter in 1214. It is the administrative centre for the Staffordshire Moorlands District Council. King John granted Ranulf de Blondeville, 6th Earl of Chester, the right to hold a weekly Wednesday market and an annual seven-day fair in Leek in 1207.

Leek's coat of arms is a saltire shield. On the top is the Stafford knot, either side is the Leek double sunset and below a gold garb. The crest is a mural crown with three mulberry leaves on a mount of heather on top of which a moorcock is resting his claw on a small-weave shuttle. The motto Arte favente nil desperandum translates to: "Our skill assisting us, we have no cause for despair."

== History ==
Leek (Lee, Leike, Leeke) formed part of the great estates of Ælfgar, Earl of Mercia; it escheated to William the Conqueror who held it at the time of the Domesday Survey. Later it passed to the earls Palatine of Chester, remaining in their hands until Ralph de Blundevill, earl of Chester, gave it to the abbey of Dieulacresse, which continued to hold it until its dissolution. The same earl in a charter which he gave to the town (temp. John) calls it a borough and grants to his free burgesses various privileges, including freedom from toll throughout Cheshire. These privileges were confirmed by Richard, abbot of Dieulacresse, but the town received no royal charter and failed to establish its burghal position.

The Wednesday market, which is still held today, dates from a grant of John to the earl of Chester; in the 17th century, this was very considerable. A fair, also granted by John, beginning on the third day before the Translation of Edward the Confessor is still held. The silk manufacture which can be traced to the latter part of the 17th century is thought to have been aided by the settlement in Leek of some Huguenots after the revocation of the Edict of Nantes.

In the 17th and 18th centuries, the town was famous for its ale. Prince Charles Edward Stuart passed through Leek on his march to Derby (1745) and again on his return journey to Scotland. A story in connection with the Civil Wars is told to explain the expression "Now thus" occurring on the tombstone of a citizen, who by this meaningless answer to all questions sought escape on the plea of insanity.

The Leek Improvement Act 1855 (18 & 19 Vict. c. cxxxii) formed the Leek Improvement Commissioners to provide services for the town. They were later succeeded by Leek Urban District Council.

== Economy ==
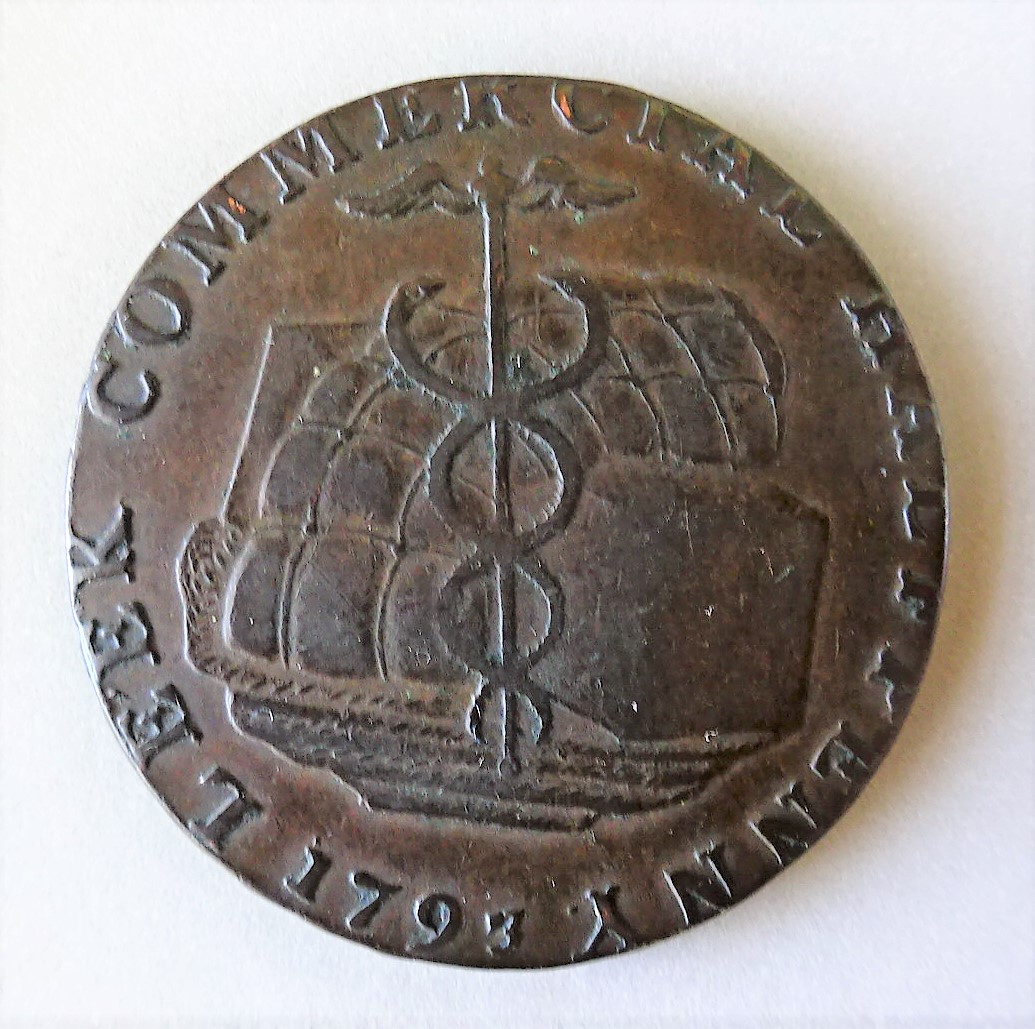
A 1793 Leek commercial half-penny token

The town has had a regular cattle market for hundreds of years, reflecting its role as a centre of local farming. Following the Industrial Revolution it was a major producer of textiles, with silk working in particular coming to dominate the industrial landscape. However, this industry has now ceased.

The mills from the town's textile era remain and many have now been converted into housing.

Britannia Building Society had its headquarters in the town and was a large local employer. Irish agricultural cooperative Ornua has its UK headquarters located in Leek, producing and purchasing butter and cheese and employing over 700 staff.

== Geography ==
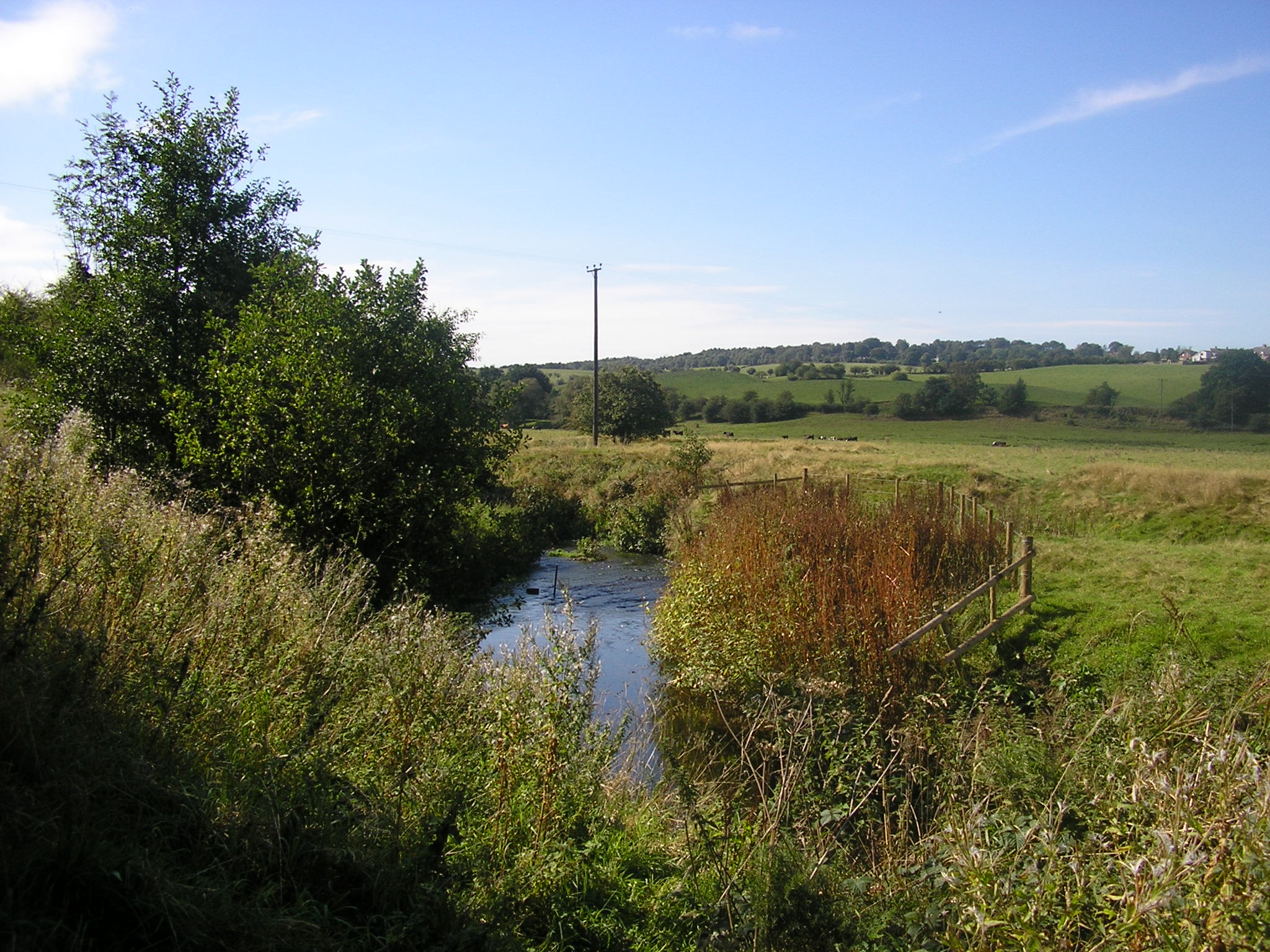
The river Churnet

Most of the town is at or above 600 feet (180 m) and is surrounded by the higher countryside of the Staffordshire Moorlands which is situated on the southern uplands of the Pennines.

Leek is built on the slope and crown of a hill which is situated just a few miles south of the Roaches; a gritstone escarpment which rises steeply to 1,657 feet (505 m).

The town is situated at the foot of the Peak District National Park and is therefore sometimes referred to as the "Gateway to the Peak District", although the town is more often referred to as the "Queen of the Moorlands".

== Architecture and development ==
Listed buildings include the original parish church, St Edward the Confessor's, and a Victorian church, All Saints', designed by Richard Norman Shaw.

Many Victorian period buildings still stand in the town:

=== Sugden buildings ===
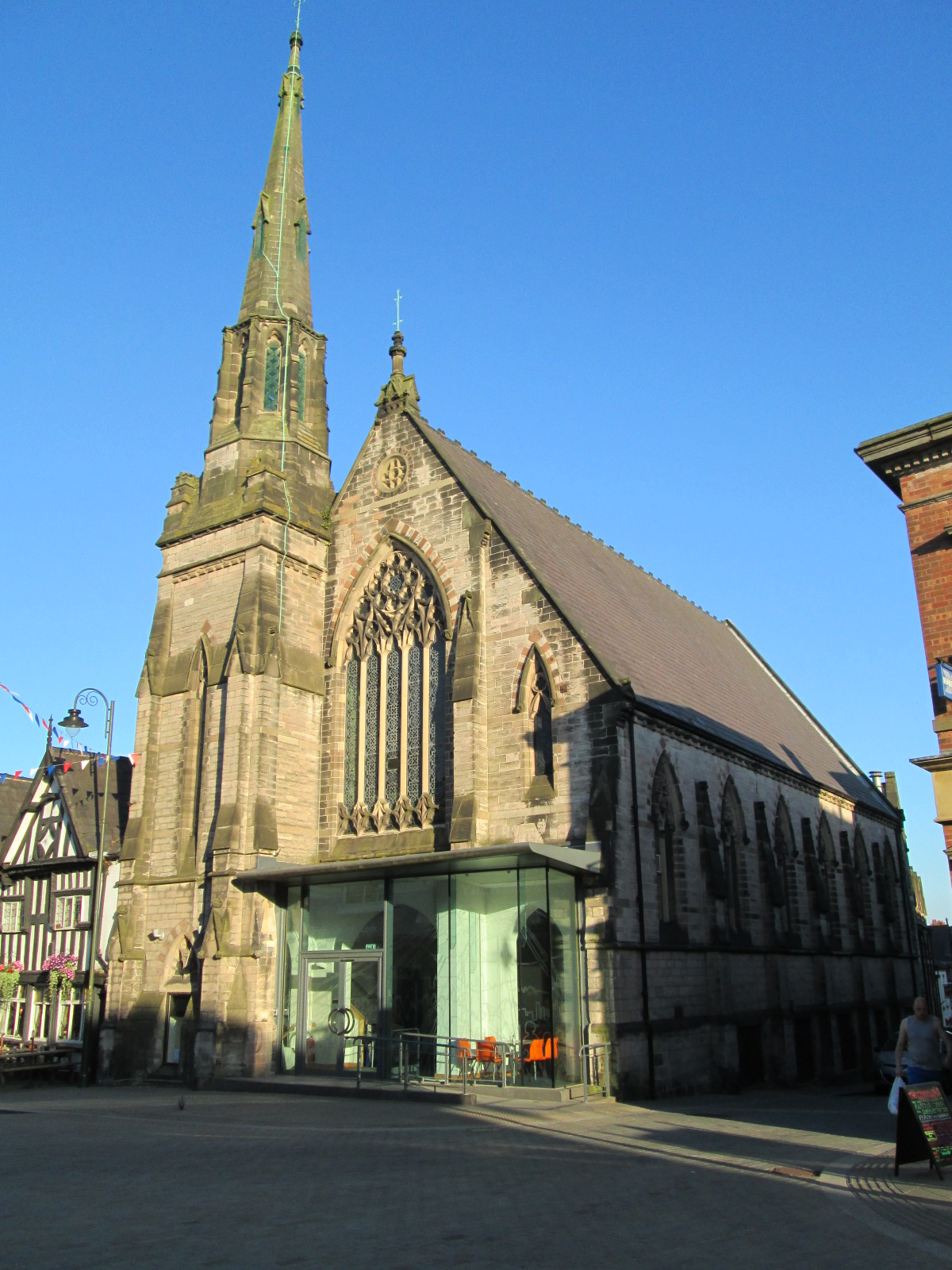
Trinity Church

Many of Leek's buildings were built by the family architectural practice of the Sugdens. In 1849, William Sugden (born 1821 in Keighley) came to Leek. He was an architect and his work on the design of the railway stations for the Churnet Valley Railway brought him to the area. In the following year, William's son, Larner Sugden, was born. After schooling in Yorkshire, Larner returned to Leek in 1866 to be apprenticed to his father as an architect, and thus was formed the famous Sugden & Son (Architects), whose influence on the town was to be profound.

The firm had offices in Derby Street. The building still survives, the ground floor now being occupied by Boots the Chemist. Larner was a great supporter of the Society for the Protection of Ancient Buildings, and so Leek's development was in sympathetic hands.

The architectural output from Sugden & Son was both prolific and varied; some of the buildings designed by the Sugdens are as follows:

- the Congregational Church with its 130-foot (40-metre) spire, (now Trinity Church), built in the Victorian Gothic Revival style (1863)
- Myatt's Mill in Earl Street (1864)
- Mill Street Methodist Chapel and Ragged School (1870)
- the Cottage Hospital, in memory of silk manufacturer James Allsop (1871)
- their own houses in Queen Street, complete with monograms for William, Larner and for Larner's French wife (1877)
- West Street School (extended in 1881)
- the District Bank, which exhibits a strong Richard Norman Shaw influence (1882)
- the Leonard Street Police Station in Scottish baronial architecture (1891); this last was probably the last joint venture of the father-and-son team because William Sugden died in 1892.

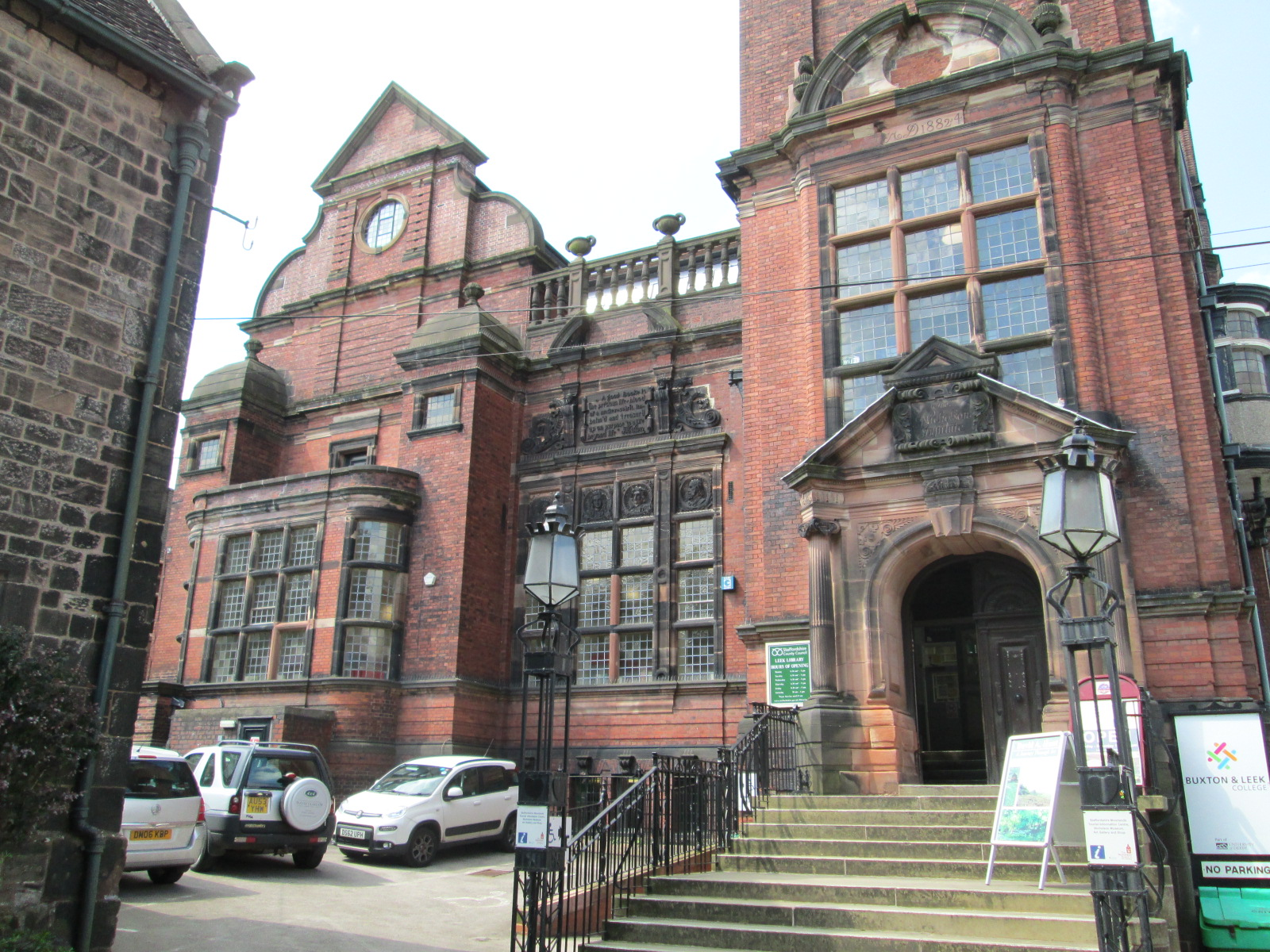
The Nicholson Institute

The Sugden masterpiece was, perhaps, the Nicholson Institute, built in the Queen Anne style, in 1882. That this building is tucked away behind the 17th-century 'Greystones' is a further indication of Larner's regard for old buildings. Larner would not countenance demolition of the old building, and so, as the Nicholsons owned the land to the rear, that is where the institute was built. Larner cleverly incorporated the busts of Shakespeare, Newton, Reynolds and Tennyson into the building representing 400 years of artistic and scientific achievement from the 16th to the 19th century and embracing literature, science, art and poetry.

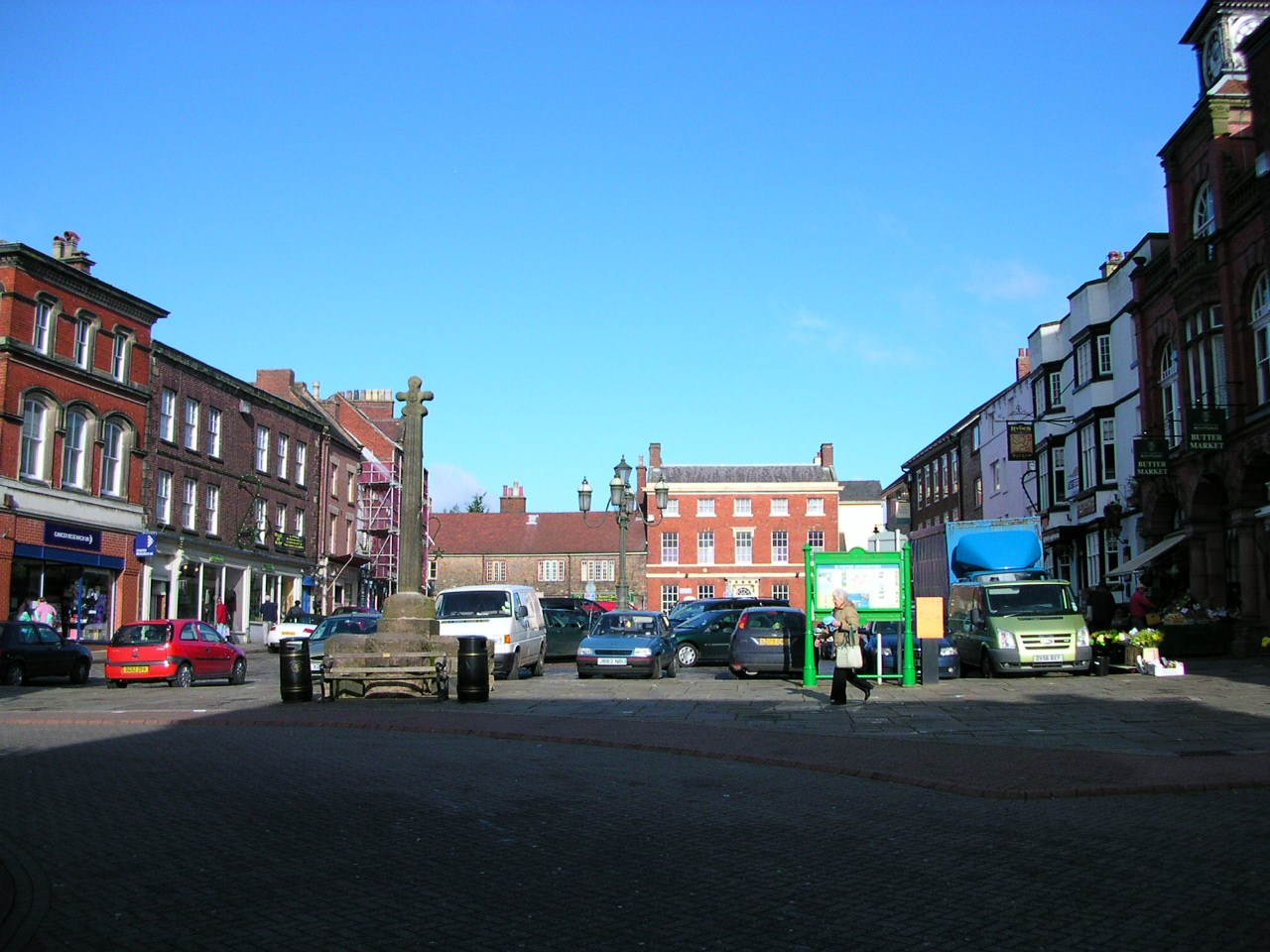
Market Place

In 1899, came the Technical Schools and the Co-operative Society Hall. Although the original town centre cattle market was demolished and replaced with a bus station and shopping centre in the 1960s, the new cattle market was built on the edge of town adjacent to the railway station. Later, this was one of those closed following Dr Beeching's recommendations; a supermarket now stands on the site.

The Nicholson War Memorial was dedicated in 1925.

Leek offers some contemporary architecture, most notably the alterations and refurbishment to Trinity Church on Derby Street (2011) and new teaching building on Horton Street for Leek College (2013).

== Education ==
- All Saints' Church of England First School
- Churnet View Middle School
- St Edwards Middle School
- Leek High School
- Westwood College
- Westwood First School
- Leek School of Art, part of Buxton & Leek College

The town retains the three-tier schooling system. St. Edwards Academy (previously St. Edwards Middle, then St. Edwards Junior High) has the highest student capacity of any 'middle school' in Staffordshire, at 768 students.

== Transport ==
=== Buses ===
The town of Leek is served by First Potteries. There is a generally hourly service on route 18 to Hanley and 16 on an alternative route via Cellarhead. There are also bus services to the nearby towns of Buxton and Macclesfield.

=== Railway ===
The nearest station is at Congleton, for local stopping Northern Trains services to Manchester Piccadilly, and at Stoke-on-Trent for Avanti West Coast inter-city services between London Euston and Manchester Piccadilly.

The former Leek railway station was opened by the North Staffordshire Railway on 13 July 1849. The Stoke–Leek line lost its passenger service in 1956, whilst the Northern section of the Churnet Valley line to Macclesfield was closed in 1960; the Southern section to Uttoxeter closed in 1965. Leek station was closed in 1965 and was completely demolished in 1973; the site is now occupied by a Morrisons supermarket.

==== Heritage ====
The Churnet Valley line now operates as a heritage railway and is located to the south of the town; services run between Kingsley and Froghall and Ipstones.

Another 1 1/2 mi (2.5 km) section of the former trackbed is occupied by the Rudyard Lake Steam Railway, a 10 1/4 in-gauge (260 mm) tourist line which runs beside Rudyard Lake, to the north-west of Leek.

==== Future ====
Plans are afoot to build a new station roughly 1/2 mile (800 metres) south of the original, as part of bigger plans to develop the Barnfield area of Leek as a tourist attraction. The re-introduction of a railway service is being directed under the Reconnect Leek banner, and forms part of proposals to reopen the Stoke–Leek line, which survived as a goods-only line to serve the former sand quarry at Oakamoor.

== Tourist attractions and leisure ==
=== In Leek ===
Leek's double sunset on and around the summer solstice attracts many tourists. This event, first recorded by Robert Plot, occurs when the sun sets behind the Cloud, subsequently partially reappearing in the hollow of the hill's steep northern side, before setting again. Plot's detailed account can be found in his book The Natural History of Staffordshire. Traditionally, the best location for seeing the double sunset was in the grounds of the parish church, but it is no longer visible from there. Locations to witness the spectacle are from Lowe Hill, on the outskirts of the town, and from the private road to Pickwood Hall, off Milltown Way. The phenomenon and its possible observation points are described in detail in Jeff Kent's book, The Mysterious Double Sunset.

Every year in May, Leek Arts Festival takes place, celebrating the cultural heritage of the town. According to the festival's website, it began as a weekly event but soon expanded to last a whole month.

Leek came second in the Telegraph's "High Street of the Year 2013", behind winner Deal in Kent.

==== Parks and gardens ====
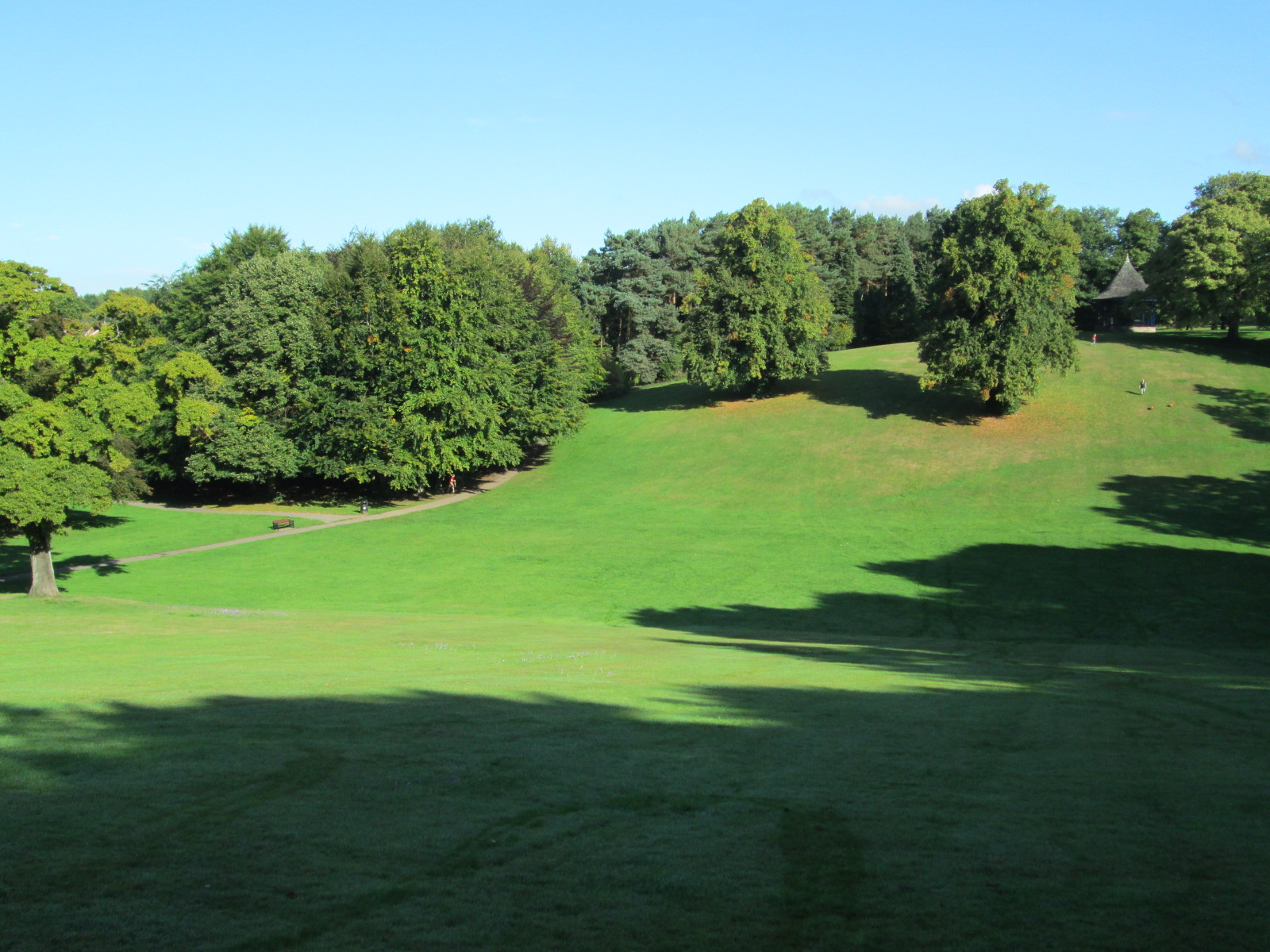
Brough Park

Parks and open spaces in Leek include Westwood Recreation Ground and Woodcroft Recreation Ground, which are west of the town centre, and Pickwood Recreation Ground to the east.

Brough Park lies immediately north of the town centre. There is formal landscaping, paths, a variety of trees and a lake. The park originated in 1913 when W. S. Brough, a local businessman, gave 10 1/2 acres of his Ball Haye Hall estate to Leek Urban District Council (LUDC); a further 8 1/2 acres was given in 1921 by Joseph Tatton, and the park was opened in 1924. There were tennis courts and a bandstand; a bowling green was opened in 1923, and swimming baths were opened in 1975.

North of the park is Brough Park Fields Nature Reserve, about 2 hectares (5 acres) of open meadows and young woodland; there are walking trails, with views towards the Roaches.

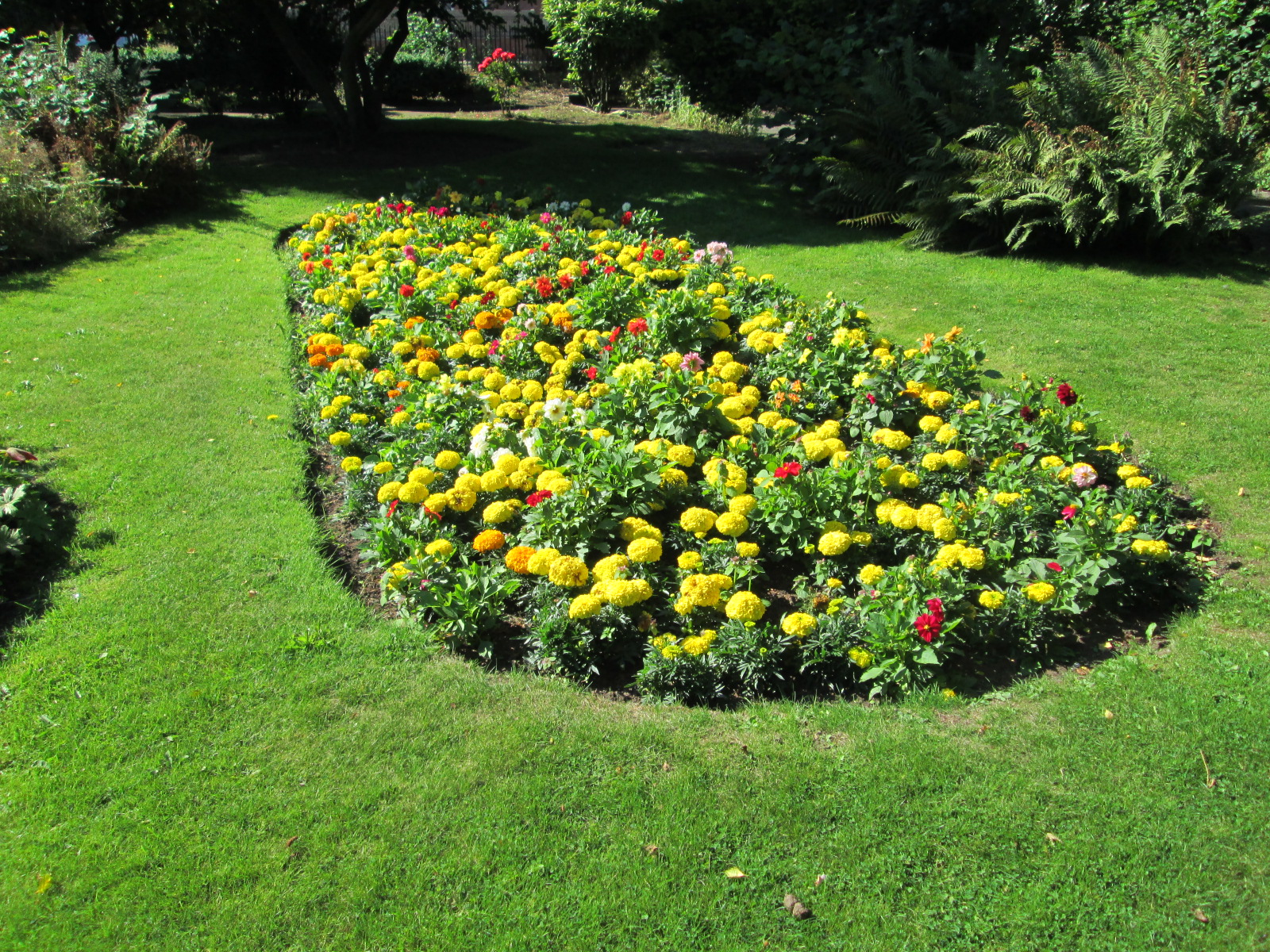
Birch Gardens

Birch Gardens, by Buxton Road at the junction with Prince Street, is a public garden in Leek. There are flower beds, grassed areas, pathways and a variety of trees and shrubs. It was created by an arrangement in which Mr Birch, a local businessman, gave land to LUDC in return for drainage facilities being provided for his silk manufacturing business; the gardens were laid out by Birch, and LUDC agreed to maintain the gardens. They were opened in December 1935 by Councillor H. Morton, to mark the silver jubilee of King George V and Queen Mary.

On 8 May 2018, there was a ceremony to dedicate Birch Gardens as a Centenary Field, in memory of those who died in World War I. It was part of the Centenary Fields programme of Fields in Trust, to safeguard public spaces. A plaque to mark the occasion was unveiled by Councillor Mike Bowen.

=== Surrounding area ===
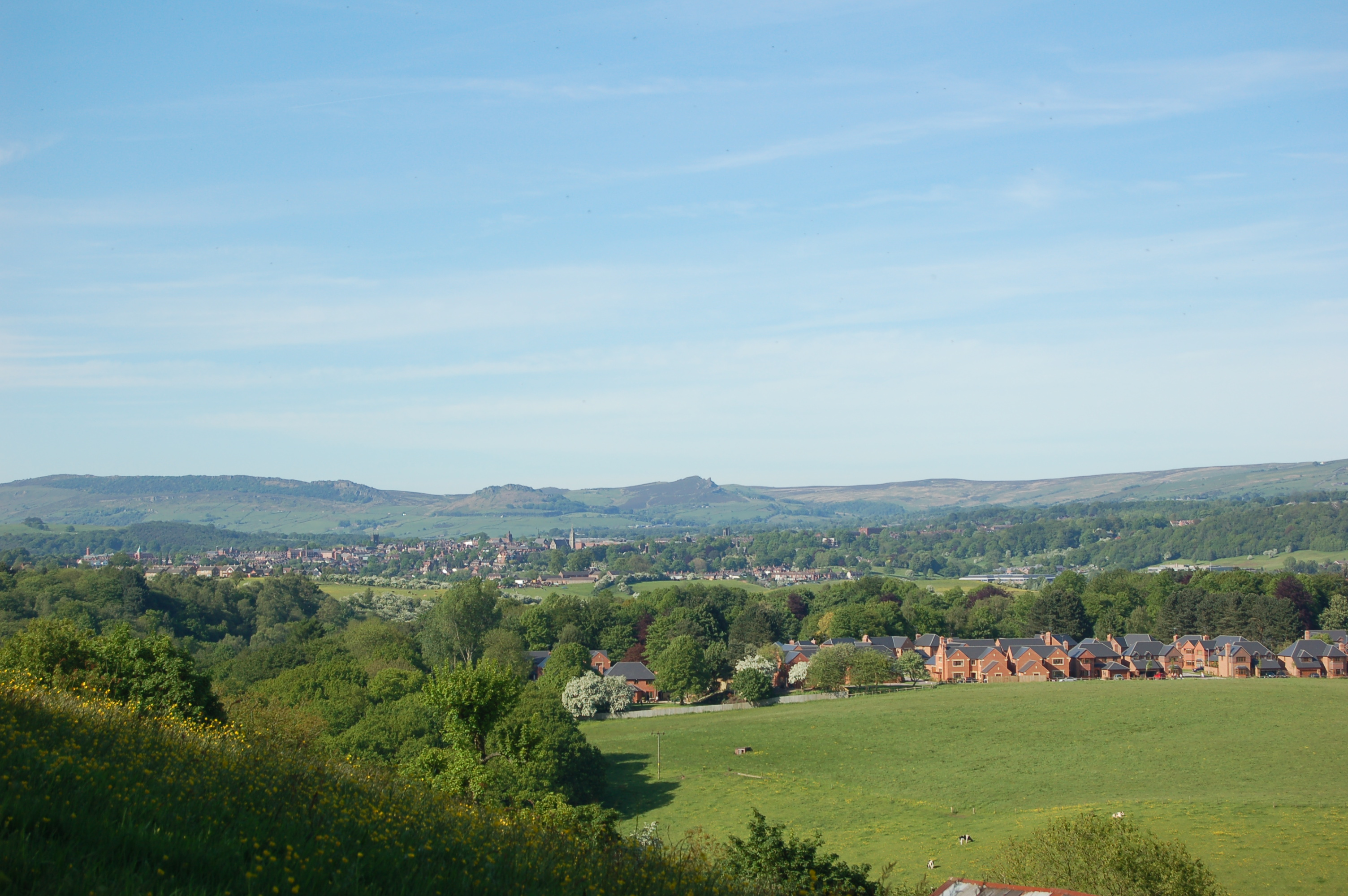
Leek with the Roaches behind

Nearby Rudyard Lake is a popular tourist attraction and home to the Rudyard Lake Steam Railway, running along its eastern shores.

Other nearby local attractions are the local football club Leek Town F.C., Alton Towers, the cultural and leisure facilities of the city of Stoke-on-Trent, and the Peak District National Park. The Churnet Valley Railway at Cheddleton also attracts several thousand passengers a year, and they are working in partnership with Moorlands & City Railways to extend the CVR the one mile (1.5 kilometres) from its current northern terminus at Leekbrook back into Leek itself along the former North Staffordshire Line.

Longer-term plans include the development of a North Staffordshire museum alongside the new railway station, and a new canal marina.

The surrounding countryside of the Staffordshire Moorlands and the Peak District makes the area a popular tourist destination. The town is on a key route north to Buxton via the A53 road. Just outside the town is Peak Wildlife Park, formerly known as Blackbrook Zoological Park. Also nearby is Coombes Valley RSPB reserve, an RSPB reserve since 1963, with walks and trails through a wooded valley. Deep Hayes Country Park, created around a former reservoir, is a short distance south-west on the A53 road.

== Media ==
Local TV coverage is provided by BBC West Midlands and ITV Central. Television signals are received from the Sutton Coldfield and local relay transmitters. BBC North West and ITV Granada can also be received from the Winter Hill TV transmitter.

Local radio stations are BBC Radio Stoke, Hits Radio Staffordshire & Cheshire, and Moorlands Radio, a community based radio station which broadcast from the town.

The Sentinel is the town's local newspaper.

== Sport ==
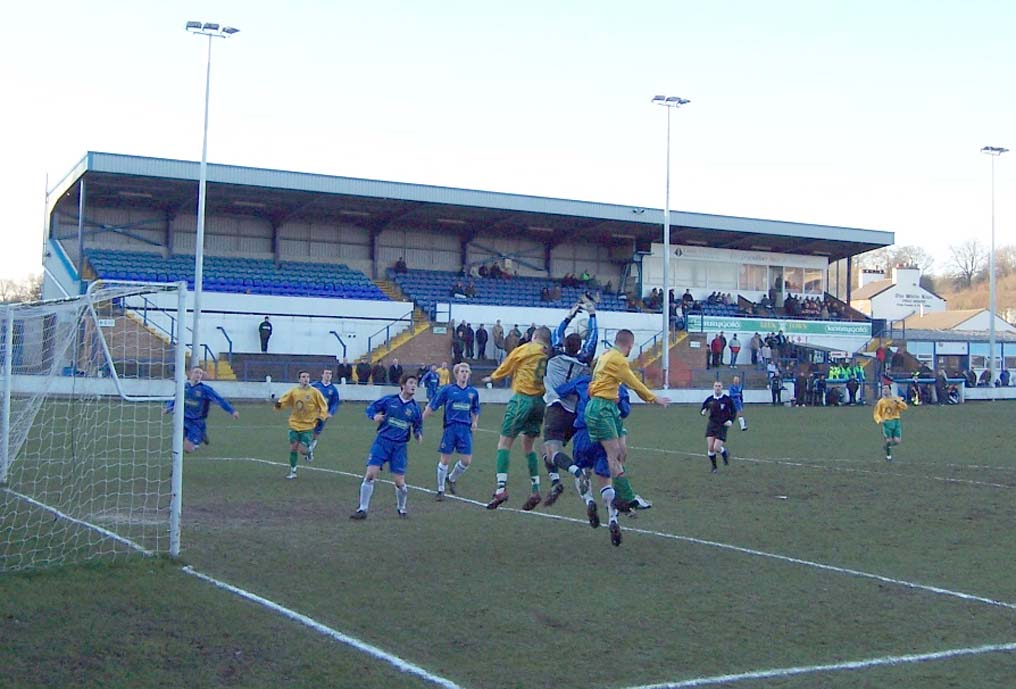
Harrison Park, home of Leek Town F.C.

The town's first known football club was Leek F.C. It was formed in the late 1870s, and wound up in the 1890s.

Leek has four football clubs. Leek Town F.C., founded in 1946, are based at Harrison Park and play in the Northern Premier League Premier Division. They were founder members of the North West Counties Football League in 1982 and in 1997 they were Northern Premier League champions and gained promotion to the Football Conference.

Leek CSOB, founded in 1945, groundshare with Leek Town at Harrison Park and play in the North West Counties Football League Division One. They were founder members of the Staffordshire County League in 1984, and were league champions in 1996. Ball Haye Green FC founded in 1880 play in the Staffordshire County Senior League and most recently won the Staffordshire FA Vase in 2017. In 2016, Staffordshire Moorlands FC were set up in the town and began their first season in the league pyramid.

Leek Hockey Club is based on Macclesfield Road, where they have a club house and four grass pitches, although league matches are played on their own astroturf pitch at Leek High School as well as at Westwood College. The club competes in the Midlands Hockey League. Previous players have included Olympic gold medallist Imran Sherwani and England and GB international Scott Cordon.

Leek Cricket Club is also based on Macclesfield Road.

Leek Archery Club use the Macclesfield Road site for outdoor shooting, as well as a private indoor range in the town centre.

Leek & District Gun Club previously hosted monthly Clay Pigeon shoots at Westwood Farm, west of Leek. The club closed on 26 December 2020.

Leek RUFC bears the name of the town, but is based in nearby Cheddleton.

There are a number of other clubs in the area including tennis, swimming, bowls and sailing.

== Notable residents ==
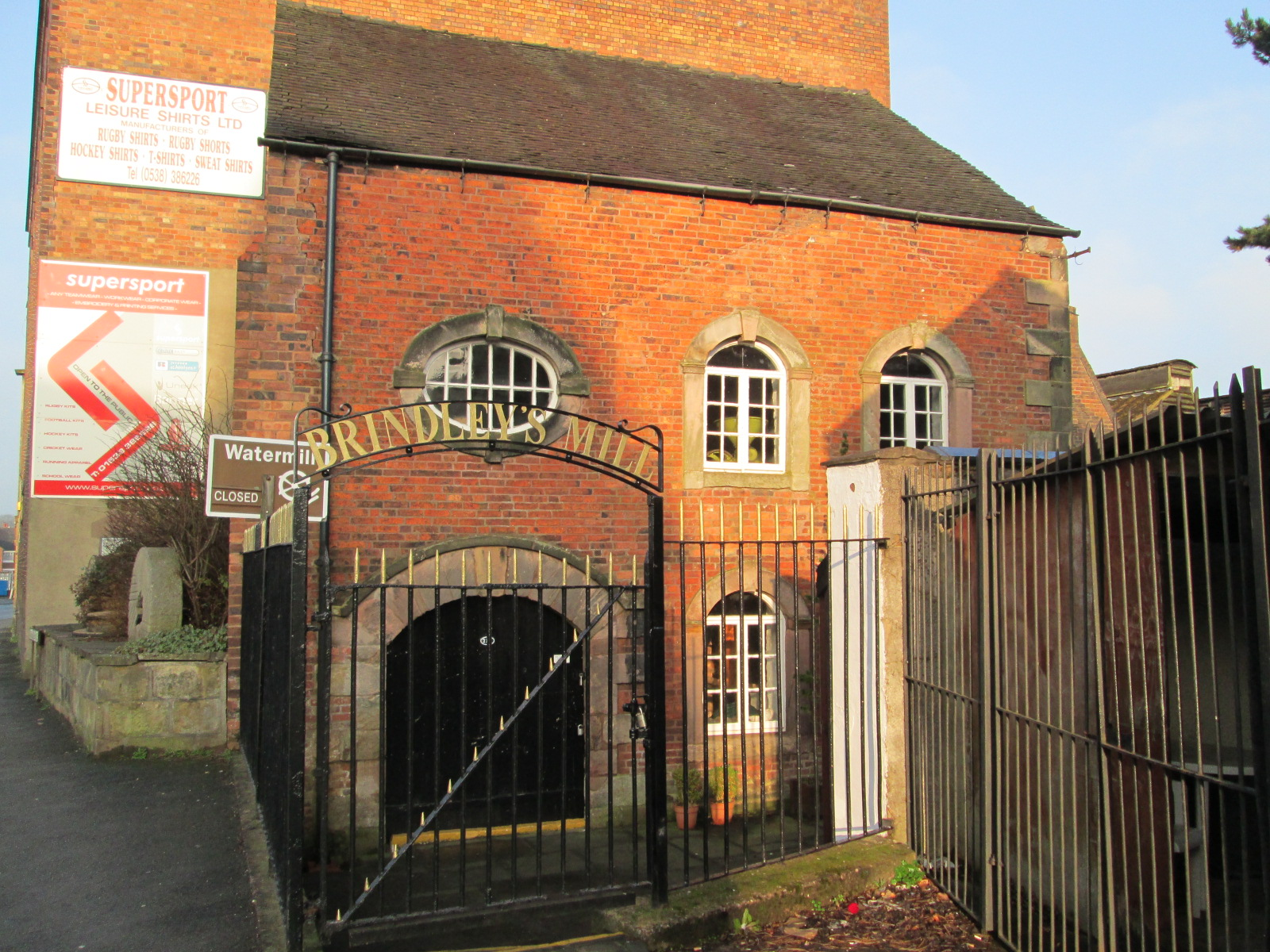
Brindley Water Mill

- James Brindley was an 18th century canal engineer. He built a water-powered corn mill in 1752. This watermill is now preserved as Brindley Water Mill and Museum.
- William Morris, founder of the Arts and Crafts movement, often visited Leek between 1875 and 1878. He studied dyeing with Thomas Wardle, owner of a dyeworks in the town, and it was Leek which provided his firm with silk. It was through the Society for the Protection of Ancient Buildings, which he founded in 1877, that he came into contact with Larner Sugden, the local architect. Sugden would play a part in establishing a "William Morris Labour Church" in Leek, after Morris' death in 1896. Sugden also published a series called "the Bijou of Leek Freethought Reprints". The 7th volume, published 1884, contained a lecture by Morris, entitled Art and Socialism.
- Professor Dame Averil Cameron, Professor of Late Antique and Byzantine History in the University of Oxford and former Warden of Keble College, grew up in Leek.
- Dave Hill, vocalist for English new wave of British heavy metal band Demon, lives in Leek and operates rides at Alton Towers.
- Jeff Janiak, American born vocalist of influential punk / metal band Discharge and former vocalist of Broken Bones resides in Leek.
- James Ford, English musical composer, record producer and musician in the band Simian Mobile Disco was born in Stoke-on-Trent and grew up in Leek "playing bass and singing in bands by the age of ten." He has also produced work by the Arctic Monkeys and Depeche Mode.
- Thomas Parker, 1st Earl of Macclesfield (1666 in Leek – 1732) Whig politician, Lord Chief Justice 1710 to 1718, impeached for corruption 1725, fined and placed in the Tower of London
- William Benton Clulow (1802 in Leek – 1882) dissenting minister, tutor and writer.
- Thomas Bullock (1816 in Leek – 1885) Mormon pioneer, emigrated to Nauvoo, Illinois in 1843
- Alice Tredwell (1823 in Leek – 1867) railway contractor and photographer, particularly in India
- William Bromfield (1868–1950) trade unionist and Labour Party politician, MP for Leek 1918 / 1931 and 1935 / 1945
- John Platt (1886 in Leek – 1967) painter, woodcut artist and head of Leek School of Art 1910 / 1919
- Sir Philip Brocklehurst (1887 in Swythamley Park – 1975) Nimrod Expedition in Antarctica 1907–1909, led by Ernest Shackleton
- Geoffrey Wedgwood (1900 in Leek – 1977) etcher and engraver, best known for his architectural etchings
- Cyril Plant, Baron Plant (1910 in Leek – 1986) trade unionist, general secretary of the Inland Revenue Staff Federation
- Donald Nicholson (1916 in Leek – 2012) scientist, devised charts of Biochemical cycles and Methodist lay preacher
- William Bowyer (1926 in Leek - 2015) portrait and landscape painter, his work is "modern traditional" figurative painting
- Basil Hayward (1928 in Leek – 1989) footballer and manager, played in 349 league games for Port Vale F.C., 1946 to 1957
- Ken Coates (1930 in Leek – 2010) Labour Party Member of the European Parliament, 1989 to 1999
- Roy Fowler (1934 in Leek – 2009) long-distance runner, nicknamed "Red Fox" due to his speed and his red hair
- Stuart Sharratt (born 1942 in Leek) former football goalkeeper, 152 appearances for Port Vale F.C.
- Tony Lacey (born 1944 in Leek) former footballer, made 201 appearances for Port Vale F.C.
- Tom Levitt (born 1954) brought up in Leek, Labour Party politician, MP for High Peak 1997 to 2010

Amongst sportspeople associated with the town:

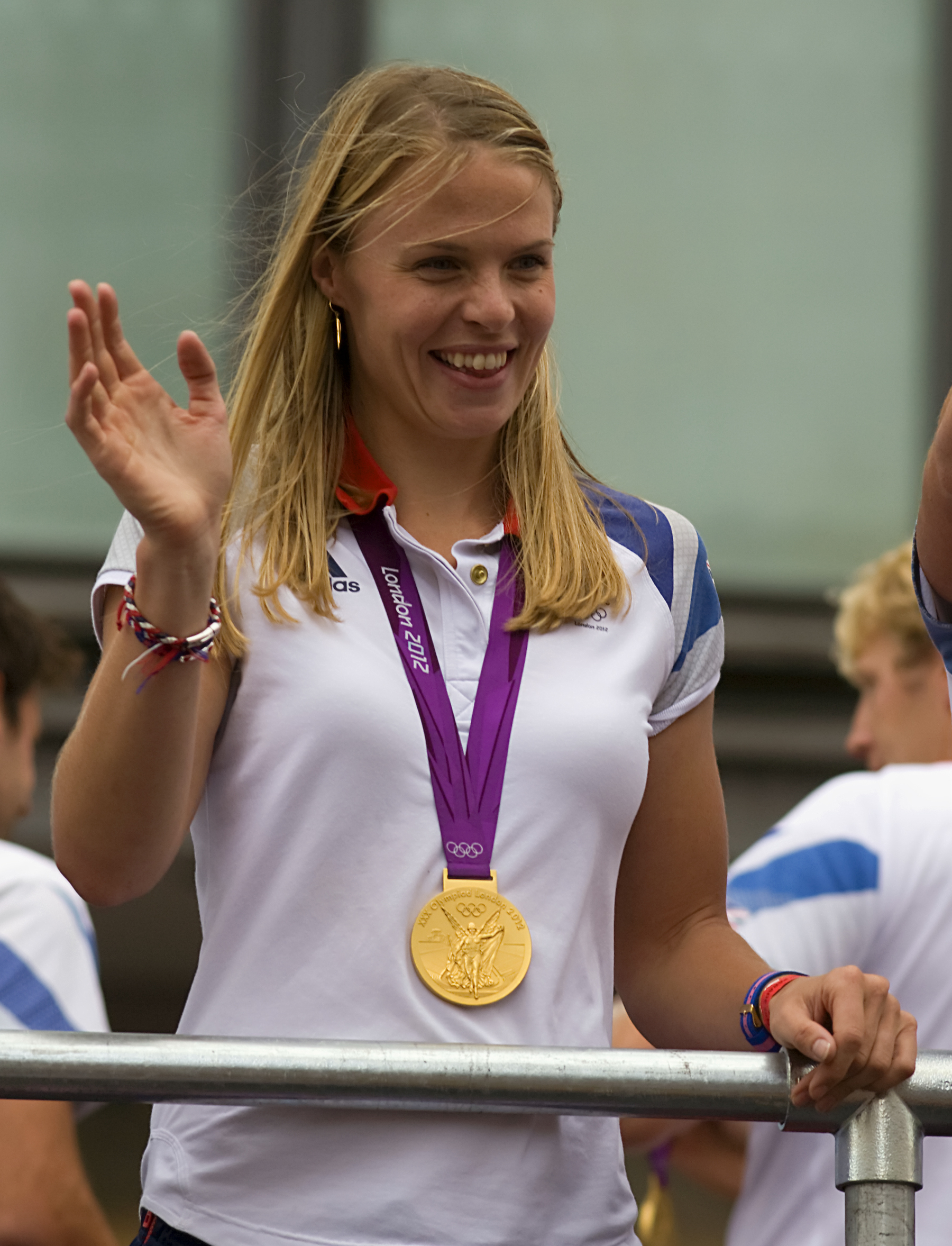
Anna Watkins

- Former five-time world professional darts champion Eric Bristow who used to live in the town.
- Anna Watkins, born in Leek, won a gold medal for rowing in the 2012 Olympics.
- Footballer Arthur Hulme (1877–1916) was born in Leek.
- Kim Barnett, the f0rmer England test cricketer was born and lives in Leek.
- Wayne Corden (born 1975 in Leek) former midfield footballer, who made 471 professional appearances.

== Twin town ==
Leek is twinned with:

- Este, Italy.

== See also ==
- Listed buildings in Leek, Staffordshire
- Chisholm, Hugh, ed. (1911). "Leek (Staffordshire)" . Encyclopædia Britannica. Vol. 16 (11th ed.). Cambridge University Press. p. 370.
