= Swythamley Hall =

18th-century country house near Leek, Staffordshire

Coordinates: 53°10′42″N 2°2′32″W

Swythamley Hall is a late 18th-century country house near Leek, Staffordshire with architectural features of classical, Italianate and Jacobean style sitting within the 140 acre private Swythamley Park (a former deer park). The current buildings on the site include the main hall (sub-divided into four self-contained apartments), with an additional three residencies in the grounds of Swythamley Park (The Coach House, The Tenants Hall and The Estate House). The Main Hall and Coach House are Grade II listed buildings.

== History ==
=== Medieval period ===
The land that is now Swythamley Park is first recorded as belonging to Dieulacres Abbey, who, in the 13th century, constructed a grange house (a large farmhouse) on the site.

At some time prior to the dissolution, the grange house was demolished and replaced by a hunting lodge that may have been referenced in the poem Sir Gawain and the Green Knight.

=== 16th century ===
Following the dissolution of Dieulacres Abbey, the manor of Swythamley was briefly held by King Henry VIII before being granted to the Traffords in 1540.

The Trafford family (who owned the adjoining manor of Heaton) replaced the hunting lodge (recorded in 1666 as taxable for eight hearths) with a new hall in about 1690.

William Trafford, a distinguished royalist who died in 1697 aged 93, escaped the fury of Oliver Cromwell's Ironsiders by disguising himself as a thresher. When the soldiers ransacked Swythamley Hall, he answered their questions by muttering, "Now, thus" between every stroke of his threshing flail. The soldiers considered him mad and departed without further action. The story is documented on his gravestone in Leek. Following this incident, the words "now, thus" were introduced as the family motto on the Trafford coat of arms.

=== 19th century ===
Most of the new hall was destroyed by fire in 1813, leaving only the "new wing". By 1831 the hall was sufficiently rebuilt to enable the Traffords to advertise the "Mansion" for auction as "recently erected of stone."

The hall was purchased in 1831 by John Brocklehurst the Younger (Note: The purchaser of Swythamley was the father of John Brocklehurst, MP for Macclesfield (1832-68).). It was subsequently inherited by John's eldest son, William, and then William's nephew Philip Lancaster Brocklehurst (1827–1904), who was created a baronet in 1903.

The Brocklehursts considerably enlarged and improved the house. In 1862 they added a canted bay to the room at the southern end, making it hexagonal. A billiard room was also added to the north end of the hall frontage around this time. This stood at the west side of what had been an open courtyard with service quarters, built at a similar time, on the other two remaining sides. The courtyard was subsequently covered over for use as a manor court/dining room and ballroom by the tenantry at the twice-yearly estate audit.

A circular dovecote with 24 flight holes and five carved heads was assembled on the west lawn. The heads are locally believed to have originated from the ruins of Dieulacres Abbey, and were previously incorporated into nearby Wincle Grange (another property owned by the Brocklehursts) before being "liberated" and incorporated into the dovecote some time in the 19th century along with scrap stone from other of the 19th-century alternations. The dovecote is not listed or scheduled.

A veranda was erected on the east side of the south wing sometime in the 1880s, only to be replaced by one that continued round the corner in 1895. A large two-storeyed porch was added to the west front in the early 20th century. From photographic evidence, it would seem a cross-shaped garden room (subsequently demolished) was built in the north-west corner about that time, creating the elegant structure with its frontage of classical, Italianate and Jacobean style elements that that stands today.

The deer park was extended in 1831 and again in 1860. A formal garden is shown south of the house on a map of 1809, but had disappeared by 1880. By 1880, a walled garden with greenhouse had been made.

=== 20th century ===
The service quarters and covered courtyard were removed in the early 20th century, a separate hall for tenants and servants to use for social events having been built on the estate in 1888. The billiard room was converted into a library in 1920 and was subsequently used by Sir Philip as his private drawing room. Substantial repairs to the hall were carried out between 1935 and 1938, when Sir Philip and family moved out for the period. Around this time one of the streams was dammed to make a lake.

Prior to the National Grid reaching Swythamley, Sir Philip Brocklehurst purchased a second hand 1928 Crossley diesel engine that was originally designed to power mills, and repurposed it to generate electricity for Swythamley Hall. The engine's operation was notable for causing a flickering effect in the hall's lighting, a characteristic attributed to its unsuitability for consistent electrical generation. Despite these challenges, the engine remained in service until Sir Philip's death in 1975 and continued to power the hall under subsequent occupants, including followers of the Maharishi Mahesh Yogi. The engine was relocated to Klondyke Mill in Draycott in the Clay, Staffordshire, and the original Engine House was subsequently converted into a single residence.

On the death of the 2nd Baronet Philip Lee Brocklehurst in 1975 his heir and great nephew sold the house and broke up the estate.

From some ten years Swythamley Hall was used as a Transcendental Meditation training centre.

=== Residential use ===
In 1987 the remaining 140 acre estate was sold for residential use and converted into eight properties:

- The original Grade II hall was converted into four apartments (North Wing, Central Wing, South Wing and Penthouse).
- The Grade II listed coach house built in 1860 was converted into a two residences that are currently configured as a single six bedroom residence (The Coach House).
- The tenants hall, originally built in 1888 to house Sir Philip's extensive hunting trophies and as a location to host parties for the tenant farmers and local residents, was converted into a single residence (The Tenants Hall).
- Garaging for eight vehicles were built on what was the west lawn. At the same time, the dovecote was moved to the lawn behind the Tenants Hall.
- The old engine house was converted into a final single residence (The Estate House) and has been extensively extended.
- The greenhouse was replaced by tennis courts when the estate was converted to residential use.
- A private helipad was installed in the deer park.

== Swythamley Zoo and the Swythamley wallabies ==
In the 1930s, Sir Philip Lee Brocklehurst's brother Henry Courtney Brocklehurst, who lived at Swythamley Hall and was a fellow of the Zoological Society of London, established a private zoo at Roche Hall, which at the time was part of the Swythamley Estate. The zoo included exotic species such as yaks, llamas, nilgai antelope, and five Bennett’s wallabies, a subspecies native to Tasmania. These wallabies were acquired as surplus stock from Whipsnade Zoo, under an agreement that allowed Whipsnade to claim half of any offspring.

During World War II, the zoo's animals were deliberately released into the wild, likely due to resource shortages or logistical challenges. While the yaks and antelopes failed to establish populations, the wallabies adapted remarkably to the Peak District's rugged terrain. Their survival defied initial expectations, given the region's colder climate compared to their native Tasmania. However, milder winters attributed to climate change and the absence of natural predators facilitated their proliferation.

By the 1950s, the wallabies numbered around 50, occupying a range stretching across The Roaches, Back Forest, and Lud's Church, and could regularly be seen from Swythamley Hall. It is thought that the last of the Swythamley wallabies died in 2010, although one may have been sighted in 2017.

== Noteworthy, listed and scheduled monuments at Swythamley ==
Swythamley Hall and Park encompasses a number of listed and scheduled monuments listed by Historic England, including:

- Main hall - The main hall was constructed as a country house built upon a medieval hunting lodge foundation. It has an early C19 core, considerably enlarged circa 1897 by Phillip Brocklehurst. The hall has an irregular plan and frontage with classical, Italianate and Jacobean elements. The hall has two storeys, except for the early C19 centre core with three gabled dormers to gabled attic, and the Italianate tower of three stages defined by strings with two blind round-arched openings to top stage and door to base. A fire of 1813 destroyed all of the original house except the "new wing", of which the left half is still visible in the entrance front. The Hall is on the register of listed and scheduled monuments as entry 1037821.
- Gates to main hall - The gates, gateway and entrance screen are ashlar and wrought iron thought to be late C18, with a frontage of approximately 20m. The screen is constructed of four identical piers approximately 2.5m high and of square plan, with frieze and cornice crenellated stands to vase cappings, gadrooned to bowl and rim (with darts) and with acorn finials, built on a low mid-C19 plinth and railings that connect to the piers. It has ornate crested and segmental-headed C18 gates to the centre. The gates are on the register of listed and scheduled monuments as entry 1037822.
- Stable Block (now the Coach House) - Portions of this building date from 1691 and 1697, but were substantially altered in 1860. The building is constructed of red and yellow coursed sandstone and was built to a 'U'-plan, with an enclosed yard to the rear. The Stable Block is on the register of listed and scheduled monuments as entry 1374755.
- Kennels - Kennels and enclosed runs were constructed in the early C19 from coursed stone with a slate roof and enclosed by cast iron railings. The three kennels are a single-storey range, each with boarded door and a dovecote inserted to the right end. The kennels are on the register of listed and scheduled monuments as entry 1293878.
- Dovecote - The large circular dovecote has 24 entrances and five carved heads that may be from Dieulacres Abbey. The dovecote is not listed or scheduled.
- Bowl Barrow - The barrow may be prehistoric or of Saxon origin. It is on the register of listed and scheduled monuments as entry 1009344.
- Cross - The cross is thought to be C12 with mid-C19 alterations constructed of gritstone and approximately 2m high on circular base. It is on the register of listed and scheduled monuments as entry 1009344.
- Victorian outdoor ice rink - During winter, a sluice gate from the Swythamley reservoir would be opened to allow water to flood a rectangular banked indentation. The water would freeze to provide an outdoor ice rink. A shallow rectangular indentation is all that remains. The ice rink is not listed or scheduled. It is located at Ordnance Survey Grid Ref: SJ 97368 64769.
- Victorian gravity fed fountain - Within the private woodland and powered only by the gravity fed flow of local streams is a three tier cast iron and enamelled water fountain. The fountain is not listed or scheduled. It is located at Ordnance Survey Grid Ref: SJ 97220 64466.
- Cannon from the Nimrod - Sir Philip Brocklehurst sponsored Ernest Shackleton's first expedition to the Antarctica (the Nimrod Expedition) and participated as the assistant geologist. After his return, Sir Philip retained a number of items from the Nimrod, including one of the ship's cannons, which now stands guard outside the gates to Swythamley Hall. Local rumor claims that the ship's bell was also retained and was originally hung in the nearby Ship public house.
- Ice House - An ice house is shown in the 1888 Ordnance Survey map of Swythamley Hall, but is no longer shown in the 1899 revised Ordnance Survey map. It was around this time that mechanical refrigerators first became available and it is likely that one was in use at Swythamley Hall, removing the need for an ice house.

== Literature ==
Historian Ralph Elliott located "The Green Chapel", featured in the medieval poem Sir Gawain and the Green Knight, at or near where the Swythamley Hall manor was later built.
