= Brocklehurst baronets =

Extinct baronetcy in the Baronetage of the United Kingdom

- Escutcheon of the Brocklehurst baronets of Swythamley Park and Stanhope Terrace
- Creation date: 1903
- Status: extinct
- Extinction date: 1981
- Motto: Veritas me dirigit, Let the truth guide me
- Arms: Per pale Argent and Sable three chevronels engrailed between as many brocks all counterchanged.
- Crest: A brock Sable holding in the mouth a slip of oak fructed Proper in front of a mount Vert thereon two oak trees also Proper.

The Brocklehurst Baronetcy, of Swythamley Park, in the parish of Rushton, in the County of Stafford and of Stanhope Terrace, Hyde Park, in the County of London, was a title in the Baronetage of the United Kingdom. It was created on 27 August 1903 for Philip Lancaster Brocklehurst. He was the youngest son of John Brocklehurst, a silk weaver and Member of Parliament for Macclesfield, the younger brother of William Coare Brocklehurst, also Member of Parliament for Macclesfield, and the uncle of John Brocklehurst, 1st Baron Ranksborough.

Philip Lancaster Brocklehurst was succeeded by his eldest son, Philip Lee Brocklehurst the second Baronet. He was an Antarctic explorer and took part in Ernest Shackleton's 1907 to 1909 expedition to Antarctica. He had met Shackleton whilst he was an undergraduate at Cambridge. He was married to Gwladys Murray (marriage later dissolved) by whom he had two daughters.

On his death in 1975 the title passed to his nephew, the third Baronet. He was the son of Lieutenant-Colonel Henry Courtney Brocklehurst (1888–1942) (who was killed in action in Burma during the Second World War), second son of the first Baronet. When he died in 1981 the baronetcy became extinct.

== Brocklehurst baronets, of Swythamley Park and Stanhope Terrace (1903) ==
- Sir Philip Lancaster Brocklehurst, 1st Baronet (1827–1904)
- Sir Philip Lee Brocklehurst, 2nd Baronet (1887–1975)
- Sir John Ogilvy Brocklehurst, 3rd Baronet (1926–1981)

== See also ==
- Baron Ranksborough

Baronetage of the United Kingdom
Preceded by Samuel baronets	Brocklehurst baronets of Swythamley Park and Stanhope Terrace; 27 August 1903	Succeeded by Cory-Wright baronets
