= Deep Hayes Country Park =

Country park in Staffordshire, England

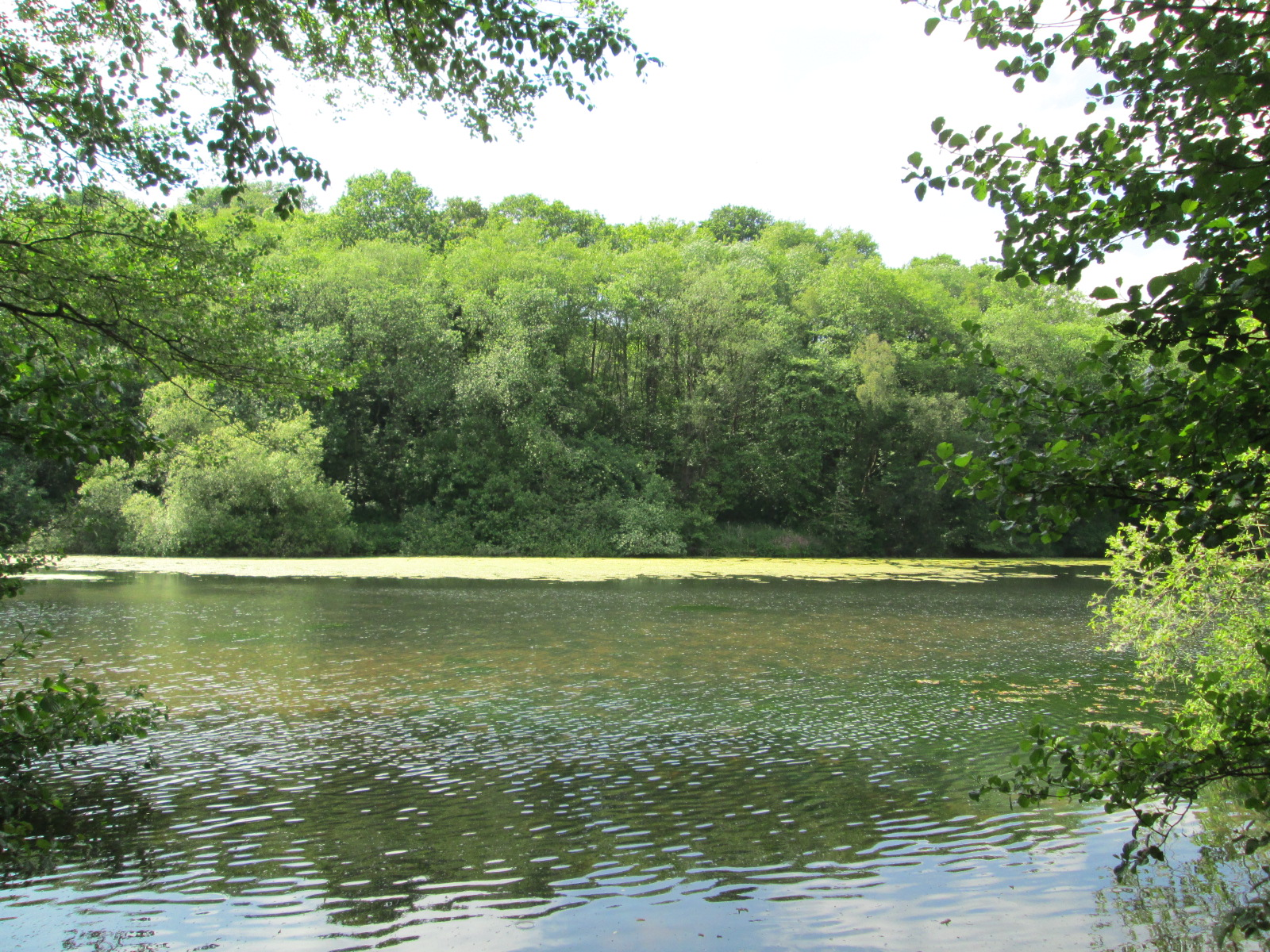
- Cumberledge Pool
- Interactive map of Deep Hayes Country Park
- Location: near Leek, Staffordshire
- OS grid: SJ 960 532
- Coordinates: 53°4′36″N 2°3′34.8″W
- Area: 60 acres (24 ha)
- Operator: Staffordshire County Council
- Website: Deep Hayes Country Park

Deep Hayes Country Park is a country park in Staffordshire, England. It is about 3 miles (4.8 km) south-west of Leek, a short distance south of the A53 road at Longsdon.

Its area is 60 acres (24 ha). Its northern boundary is the Caldon Canal, and is based around three pools (Cumberledge Pool, Park Pool and Hayes Pool), formerly a reservoir.

There is a visitor centre, with free parking and toilets. Marked pathways, of varying lengths, lead around the area of the former reservoir. There is a picnic area.

The pools have shoreline rushes and other flora; waterfowl can be seen. Roach, tench and carp have been introduced, and there are invertebrates including dragonflies and damselflies. There is woodland around the pools, and meadows, which have a diversity of flowering plants, including uncommon species. There is a bird hide.

== History ==
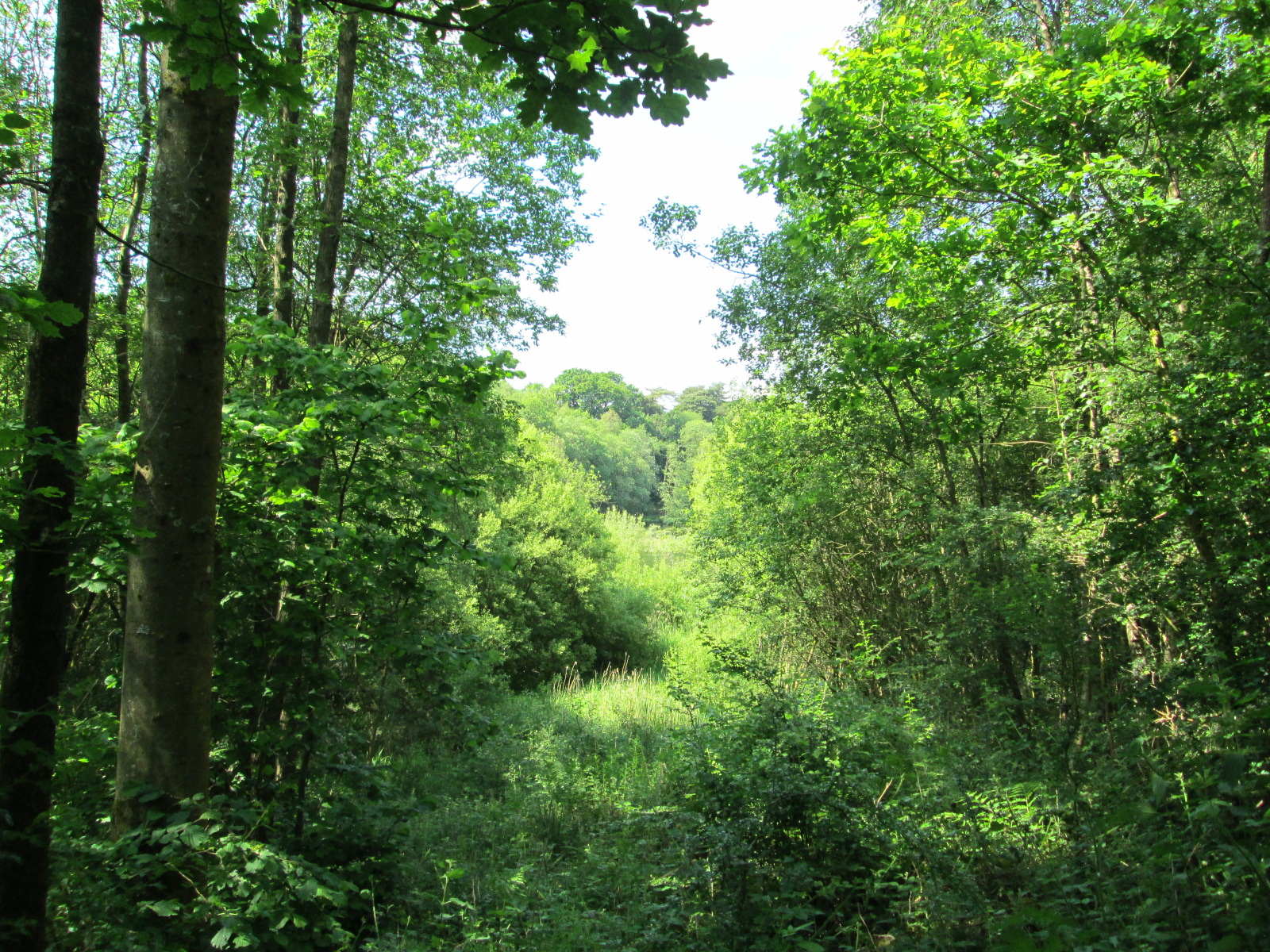
Vista across the park

Deep Hayes Reservoir was built in 1848 by the Staffordshire Potteries Waterworks Company. The company in 1847 built works to take water from a spring at Wall Grange, up to 1.5 million gallons a day, to supply water to the Potteries; the reservoir compensated for the loss of this water which served mills downstream along the River Churnet.

In 1979 problems were found with the structure of the dam, and the Severn Trent Water Authority decided to abandon the reservoir, a new borehole providing the compensating water. A project to create a country park was agreed by the water authority, Staffordshire Moorlands District Council and the Countryside Commission. From the lowered water level, three pools, Cumberledge Pool, Park Pool and Hayes Pool, were created, around which the present-day environment was established.
