= Nicholson War Memorial =

Tower in Leek, England

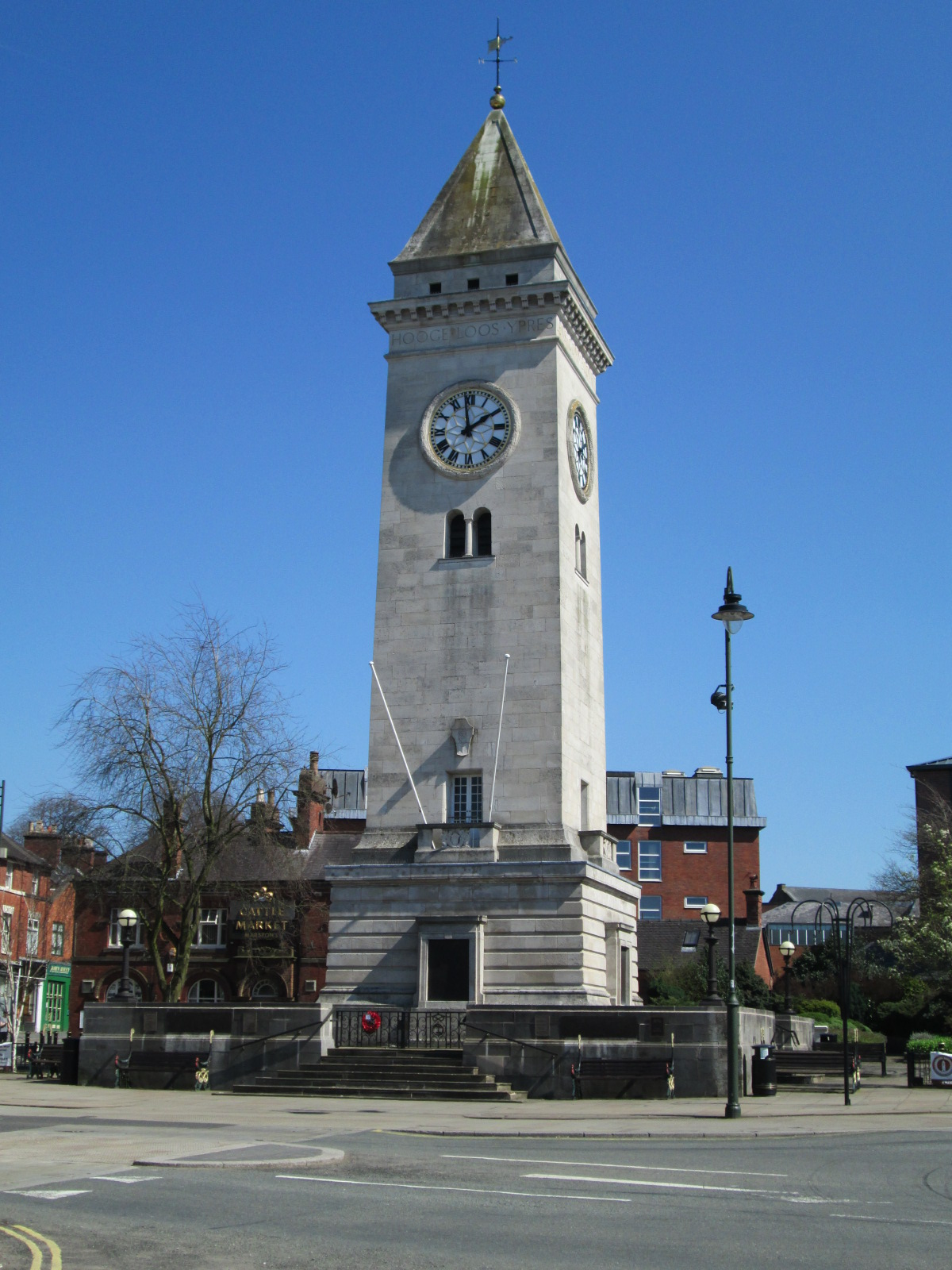
- Interactive map of the Nicholson War Memorial area

General information
- Type: War memorial; Tower
- Location: Sparrow Park, Leek, England
- Coordinates: 53°06′20″N 2°01′15″W
- Inaugurated: 20 August 1925
- Renovated: 2010–2012

Height
- Height: 90 feet (27 m)

Design and construction
- Architecture firm: Thomas Worthington & Sons
- Main contractor: Messrs E & A Frith of Macclesfield; Mr Thomas Grace of Leek
- Designations: Grade II listed

Renovating team
- Renovating firm: Prestec Ltd.

Website
- nicholsonmemorial.org.uk

The Nicholson War Memorial in Leek, Staffordshire, England is a 1925 war memorial. It was commissioned by local manufacturer Sir Arthur Nicholson and his wife Lady Marianne, née Falkner, in memory of their son Lieutenant Basil Lee Nicholson, who was killed in action at Ypres, Belgium, in 1915, at the age of 24; and in memory of all the other local men who died fighting in World War I. It now has plaques commemorating and naming 535 Leek and district men and women who died during World War I and World War II.

It is one of the tallest war memorials in the country at 90 feet (27 m) and was restored in 2010–2012.

== Structure and design ==
It is a Grade II listed building in the form of a red-brick tower clad in Portland stone, with four 2.06 metres (6.8 ft) diameter, illuminated clock faces. There are decorative wrought iron and bronze gates and lamp standards. It was designed by Thomas Worthington & Sons, of Manchester, with tablets designed by The Birmingham Guild of Artists. It was built by Messrs E & A Frith of Macclesfield and Mr Thomas Grace of Leek. The ironwork was made by a blacksmith called Mr Hart, of Salford.

The clock mechanism and the five bells were made by Gents' of Leicester. The bells weigh 1,270 kilograms (2,800 lb) in total.

== Dedication ==
The memorial was officially opened and dedicated on Thursday 20 August 1925 at 2.30 pm. A Thursday was chosen as it was the day of half-day closing for local shops. Many local factories also closed that afternoon, as a mark of respect.

Basil's brother Lt Colonel Arthur Falkner Nicholson (known as Falkner Nicholson) presided at the dedication. The other surviving brother, Lt Col Malcolm Nicholson, was also present. A dedication tablet was unveiled by Lieutenant General Sir Charles Harington, at the time General Officer Commanding, Northern Command, and the dedication was by Lionel Crawfurd, the Bishop of Stafford.

Two memorial tablets listing the names of the dead were unveiled by two Boy Scouts, who had each lost their father during the war, Frank Prime and Cyril Plant. Plant died during World War II, serving with the Royal Navy.

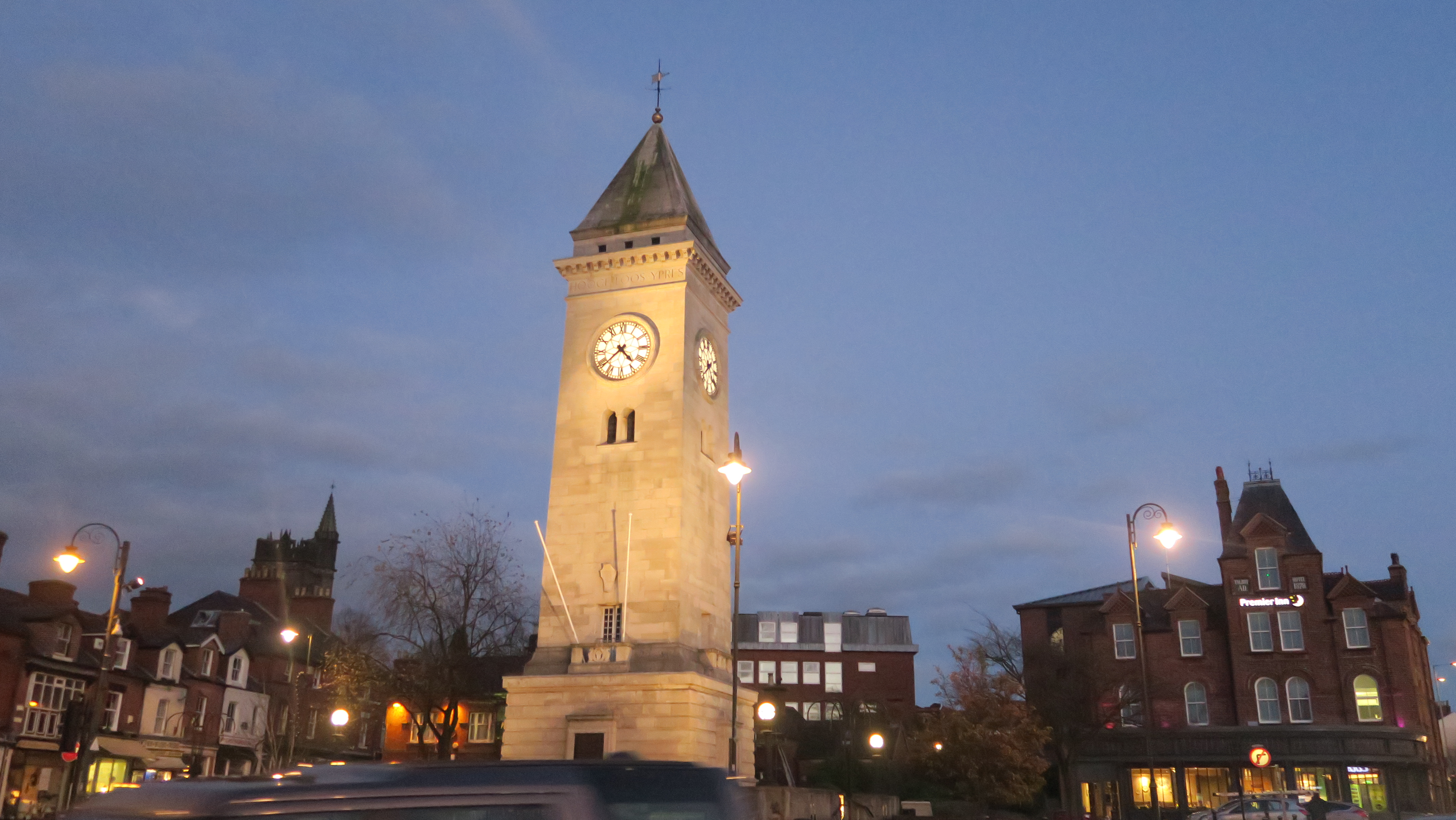
Nicholson War Memorial, Leek

At the ceremony, the deeds to the land and the building were presented to the Trustees of the Leek Town Lands and to Leek Urban District Council, who agreed to accept responsibility for the memorial on behalf of the people of Leek. Leek Town Council inherited that responsibility on their formation in 1974.

Around the top of the memorial are the names of battles involving the 46th (North Midland) Division, which included the Old Leek Battery and the Territorial 1/5th and 1/6th Battalions of the North and South Staffordshire Regiments, in which men form Leek served.

== Restoration ==
Following a £178,000 grant from the Heritage Lottery Fund the tower was restored by Prestec Ltd. of Lichfield and the clock mechanism replaced. Alterations were made to the interior of the building, to allow public access.

It reopened for public tours in 2012. Guided tours are provided by members of a voluntary group, The Friends of the Nicholson War Memorial.

The original clock mechanism is now on display in a local museum.
