= Philip Brocklehurst =

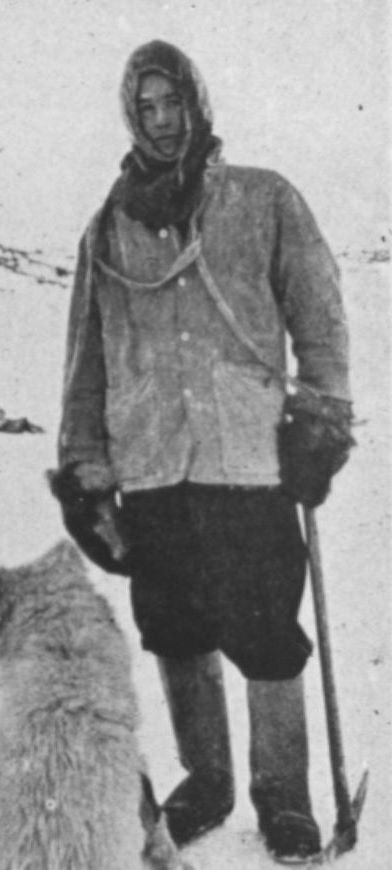
Philip Brocklehurst in 1908, during the Nimrod Expedition

Sir Philip Lee Brocklehurst, 2nd Baronet (7 March 1887 – 28 January 1975) is known particularly as a member of the Nimrod Expedition in Antarctica of 1907–1909, led by Ernest Shackleton.

== Early life ==
He was born at Swythamley Hall, Staffordshire, in 1887. His grandfather John Brocklehurst had a silk weaving business in Macclesfield and was a Member of Parliament; his father Philip Lancaster Brocklehurst was created a baronet in 1903. Philip Lee succeeded to the title, as "2nd Baronet Brocklehurst, of Swythamley Park, Leek, Staffordshire", on 10 May 1904.

In 1904 he joined the Territorial Army in the Derbyshire Yeomanry, where he was later promoted to major in March 1916 and colonel in 1924.

Brocklehurst was educated at Eton College (1 year only), Park Holm, Buxton and Trinity Hall, Cambridge, where he left without taking a degree. He represented Cambridge University at boxing in 1905, 1906 and 1907 as a lightweight against Oxford University, and obtained a half blue.

== Nimrod Expedition ==
Ernest Shackleton, looking for members of his proposed expedition to Antarctica, met Brocklehurst in London in 1906, and was impressed by his boxing achievements. Brocklehurst offered to contribute to the expedition funds. The appointment was confirmed in May 1907; he was Assistant Geologist.

He travelled independently, paying for a first class passage to New Zealand, where he joined the other members of the expedition on the Nimrod. After a base was established in Antarctica at Cape Royds in February 1908, he was one of a party which climbed the volcano Mount Erebus (unclimbed until then). The party of Edgeworth David, Douglas Mawson, Alistair Mackay, Eric Marshall, Brocklehurst and Jameson Adams started on 5 March. Brocklehurst suffered from frostbitten feet, and was unable to complete the climb; the others reached the summit on 10 March. Afterwards, a big toe had to be amputated because of frostbite.

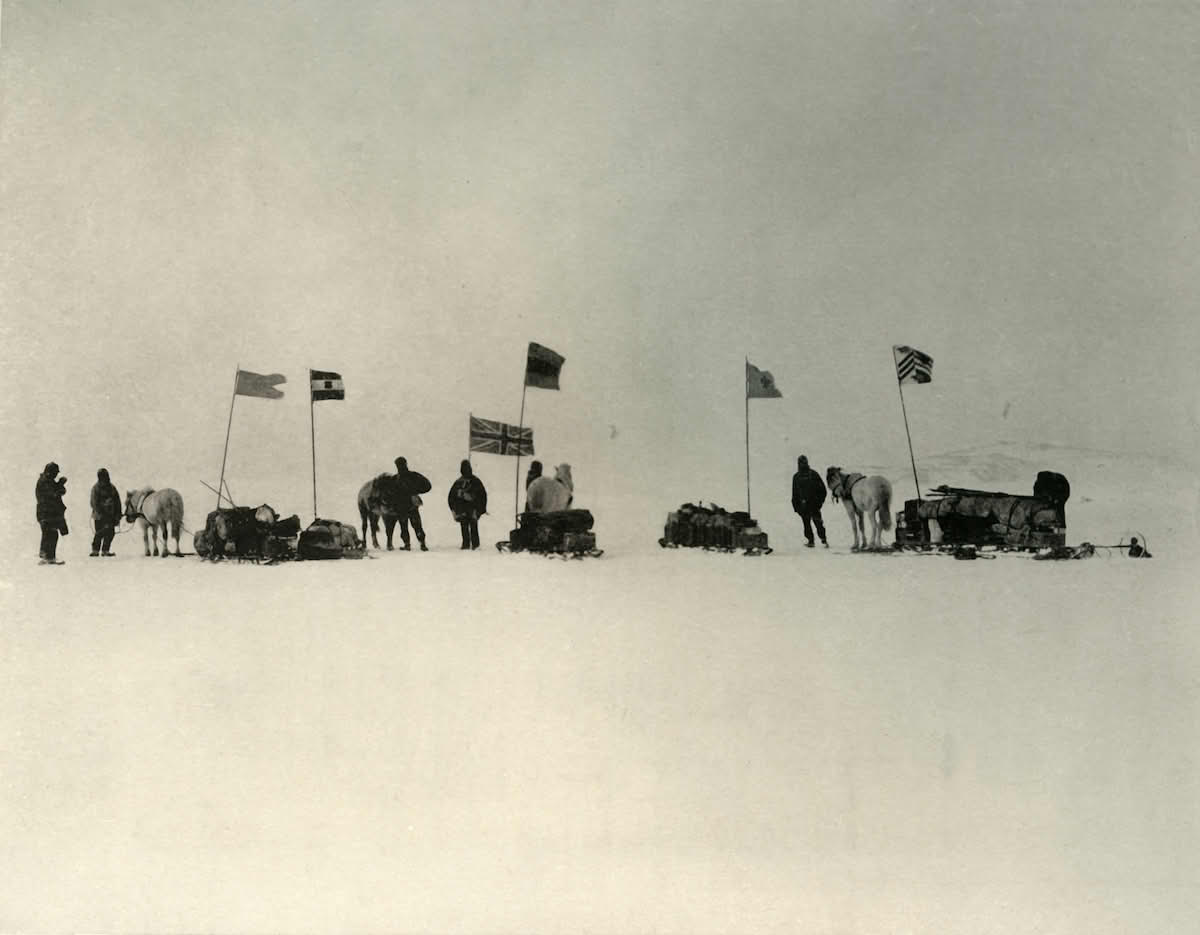
The polar party and support party about to begin the journey towards the South Pole

He was not chosen for the polar party, but was part of the support party which accompanied them for part of the way. The four-man polar party, intending to reach the South Pole, eventually reached a Farthest South latitude of 88° 23' S, 97.5 nautical miles (180.6 km; 112.2 mi) from the pole.

Brocklehurst, as a member of the shore party of the expedition, was awarded the Silver Polar Medal in 1909.

== After the Nimrod Expedition ==
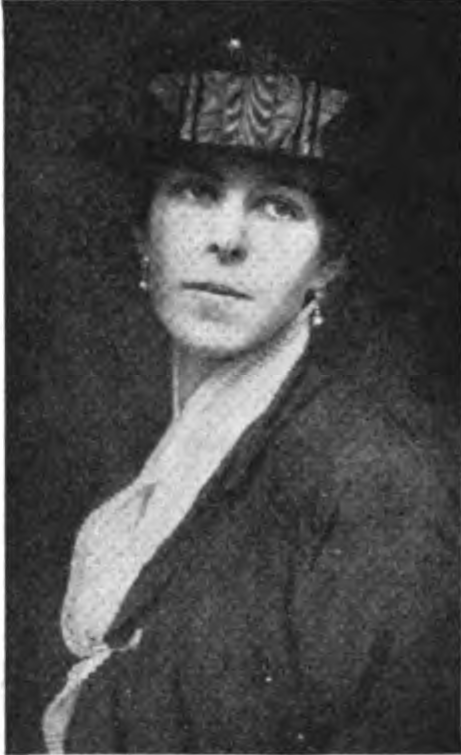
Lady Brocklehurst

On 9 July 1913 Brocklehurst married Gwladys Murray, daughter of Colonel Charles Edward Gostling Murray. They were divorced in 1947.

He planned to join Shackleton's Imperial Trans-Antarctic Expedition in 1914. However he gained a commission in the 1st Regiment of Life Guards, and he sailed to Flanders in October 1914. He was shot in the left shoulder after 11 days in Belgium, and after recuperating in London he returned in February 1915. In 1918 he transferred to the 9th Sudanese Battalion of the Egyptian Army, where he served for two years.

In 1930 Brocklehurst, his wife, and an estate employee, travelled in a car across the Sahara Desert. In the Second World War, he commanded the 2nd regiment of the Mechanised Brigade of the Arab Legion and later joined the British Council for Palestine-Transjordan.

== Arms ==
Coat of arms of Philip Brocklehurst

Crest
A brock Sable holding in the mouth a slip of oak fructed Proper in front of a mount Vert thereon two oak trees also Proper.
Escutcheon
Per pale Argent and Sable three chevronels engrailed between as many brocks all counterchanged.
Motto
Veritas Me Dirigit

== Cited sources ==
- Huntford, Roland (1985). Shackleton. London: Hodder & Stoughton. OCLC 13108800.

Baronetage of the United Kingdom
Preceded by Philip Brockleburst	Baronet (of Swythamley Park and Stanhope Terrace); 1904–1975	Succeeded by John Brocklehurst
