= William Ross (footballer, born 1874) =

English footballer

Personal information
- Full name: William Ross
- Date of birth: 1874 (Note: Joyce and the Lincoln City FC Archive list Ross's year of birth as 1874, but Stuart Basson's Chesterfield site gives 1876.)
- Place of birth: Kiveton Park, England
- Position: Centre forward

Senior career*
Years	Team	Apps	(Gls)
- Kiveton Park
1894–1895	Chesterfield Town	18	(13)
1895–1897	Sheffield United	19	(3)
1897–1898	Lincoln City	22	(3)
1898–1899	Gravesend United		
1899–1900	Reading		
1900–1904	Notts County	110	(28)
1904–1905	Grimsby Town	32	(7)
1905–1908	Glossop	51	(21)
- * Club domestic league appearances and goals

William Ross (1874 – after 1907) was an English footballer who scored 62 goals from 234 appearances in the Football League playing for Sheffield United, Lincoln City, Notts County, Grimsby Town and Glossop. A centre forward, he also played non-league football for Kiveton Park, Chesterfield Town, Gravesend United and Reading.
