= Caldon Low Halt railway station =

Disused railway station in England

Caldon Low Halt

General information
- Location: Cauldon, Staffordshire, Staffordshire Moorlands; England
- Coordinates: 53.0428°N 1.8917°W
- Grid reference: SK073495
- Platforms: 1

Other information
- Status: Disused

History
- Original company: North Staffordshire Railway
- Post-grouping: London Midland and Scottish Railway

Key dates
- 1 July 1905: Opened
- 30 September 1935: Closed
Location

Caldon Low Halt railway station was a railway station near the hamlet of Cauldon, Staffordshire. It was opened by the North Staffordshire Railway (NSR) in 1905 and closed in 1935.

== Construction and opening ==
The station was on the NSR Waterhouses branch line from Leekbrook Junction to Waterhouses. The single line branch was authorised on 1 March 1899 by the Leek, Caldon Low, and Hartington Light Railways Order, 1898, and construction took until 1905.

== Station layout ==
The station was solely for the use of workmen from the nearby Caldon Low quarries, and their families. There were no goods facilities, just a single wooden platform for passengers with an old coach body to act as an waiting room. The halt a request stop and was unstaffed with passengers paying for their tickets at their destination. The only exception to this was on Leek market days when a porter from Waterhouses would walk to Caldon Low to issue tickets.

== Closure ==
The branch line was never a financial success and the halt closed on 30 September 1935 when passenger services on the line were withdrawn.

== Route ==
Preceding station	Historical railways	Following station
Waterhouses	North Staffordshire Railway; Waterhouses branch	Winkhill
