= Winkhill railway station =

Former railway station in Staffordshire, England

Winkhill
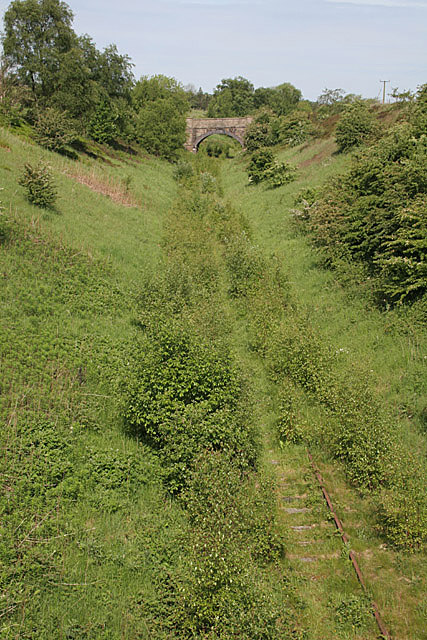
- The old railway cutting (June 2007)

General information
- Location: Winkhill, Staffordshire Moorlands, England
- Coordinates: 53.0539°N 1.9169°W
- Grid reference: SK056507
- Platforms: 1

Other information
- Status: Disused

History
- Original company: North Staffordshire Railway
- Post-grouping: London Midland and Scottish Railway

Key dates
- June 1910: Opened
- 30 September 1935: Closed to passengers
- 4 May 1964: Closed to freight
Location

Winkhill railway station, or Winkhill Halt, served the hamlet of Winkhill, in Staffordshire, England. It was opened by the North Staffordshire Railway (NSR) in 1910 and closed to passenger use in 1935, but remained open to freight traffic until 1964.

== History ==
=== Construction and opening ===
The station was on the NSR Waterhouses branch line from Leekbrook Junction to Waterhouses. The single line branch was authorised on 1 March 1899 by the Leek, Caldon Low, and Hartington Light Railways Order, 1898; construction took several years, with the line opening in 1905.

The station at Winkhill was a later addition to the line. Although a station was included in the original tender for construction of the branch line, it wasn't until 1908 that a single siding for freight traffic was provided at the location and another two years before a station was constructed for passenger traffic.

=== Layout ===
The station had a single platform and a single siding, with limited goods facilities.

=== Closure ===
The branch line was never a financial success and passenger services were withdrawn on 30 September 1935. The station remained open as a goods station until May 1964 when all traffic on the branch, except mineral workings from Caldon Low quarries, was withdrawn.

Preceding station	Historical railways	Following station
Caldon Low Halt	North Staffordshire Railway; Waterhouses branch	Ipstones

== The site today ==
No traces of the station remain, although some evidence of the line nearby is extant.
