= Bradnop railway station =

Disused railway station in Staffordshire, England

Bradnop
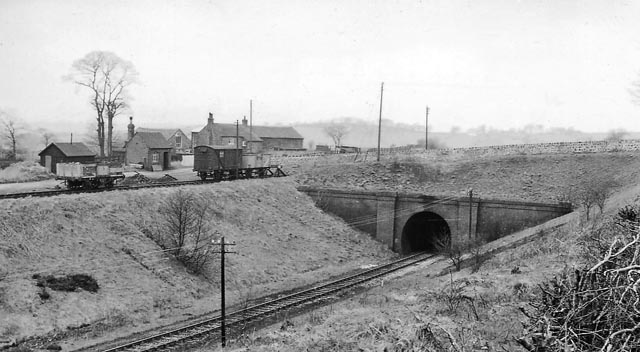
- The station in 1962

General information
- Location: Bradnop, Staffordshire Moorlands, England
- Coordinates: 53.0910°N 1.9860°W
- Grid reference: SK010548
- Platforms: 1

Other information
- Status: Disused

History
- Original company: North Staffordshire Railway
- Post-grouping: London Midland and Scottish Railway

Key dates
- 5 June 1905: Opened
- 30 September 1935: Closed to passengers
- 4 May 1964: Closed to freight
Location

Bradnop railway station served the village of Bradnop, in Staffordshire, England. It was opened by the North Staffordshire Railway (NSR) in 1905 and closed to passenger use in 1935, but remained open to freight traffic until 1964.

== History ==
=== Construction and opening ===
The station was on the NSR branch from Leekbrook Junction to Waterhouses. The single-line branch was authorised on 1 March 1899 by the Leek, Caldon Low and Hartington Light Railways Order, 1898, and construction took several years.

The station at Bradnop was built in a cutting on the long gradient from Leek Brook to Ipstones. Digging the cutting required the excavation of 500,000 cubic yards (380,000 m^{3}) of material to create a cutting 1 mile (1.6 km) long and up to 60 feet (18.3 m) deep in parts.

=== Layout ===
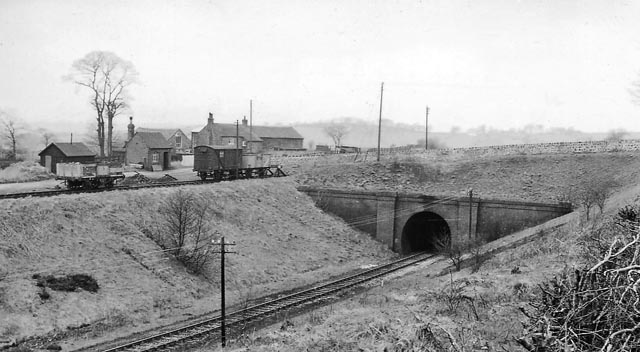
The station site in 1962, showing the goods yard high above the main running line

The station had a single platform and limited goods facilities. Although the station buildings and passenger platform were in a cutting, the small goods yard was constructed at the top of the bank and this necessitated quite a steep gradient in the track leading from the branch line to the goods yard. A passing loop was installed and Bradnop was a block section with Ipstones and Leek Brook East signalboxes, although Bradnop itself was not equipped with a signal box, only a ground frame.

In NSR days, the station staff comprised a station master, a porter and a porter/signalman.

The station buildings were of wooden construction and had to be rebuilt following a fire in April 1926, which destroyed the original building.

=== Closure ===
The branch line was never a financial success and passenger services were withdrawn on 30 September 1935. It remained open as a goods station until May 1964 when all traffic on the branch, except mineral workings from Caldon Low quarries, was withdrawn.

Preceding station	Historical railways	Following station
Ipstones; Waterhouses branch	North Staffordshire Railway	Leek; Churnet Valley Line; Line open, station closed

== The site today ==
Mineral trains to Caldon Low continued until 1989, when the line was mothballed. In 2009, Moorland and City Railways (MCR) purchased the line with the intention of reopening the line to mineral traffic from the quarry.

In 2014, this plan was placed on hold as the Competition Commission ruled that Lafarge Tarmac must sell one of its sites, possibly Caldon Low; the heritage Churnet Valley Railway (CVR) sought to purchase the line themselves.

By October 2020, CVR had purchased the line from MCR and most trains now currently terminate at Ipstones.
