= Brown End Quarry =

Nature reserve

- Location within Staffordshire
- Location: Waterhouses, Staffordshire
- OS grid: SK 089 502
- Coordinates: 53°2′55″N 1°52′0″W
- Area: 1 hectare (2.5 acres)
- Operator: Staffordshire Wildlife Trust
- Designation: Site of Special Scientific Interest; Regionally important geological site
- Website: www.staffs-wildlife.org.uk/nature-reserves/brown-end-quarry

Brown End Quarry is a nature reserve of the Staffordshire Wildlife Trust, near the village of Waterhouses in Staffordshire, England. It is designated a Site of Special Scientific Interest, and a regionally important geological site.

== Description ==
The site, area 1 hectare (2.5 acres), is a former limestone quarry; there was quarrying from the mid 18th century. In 1951, when the Peak District National Park was formed, further development of the quarry was restricted, and quarrying ended in the 1960s. It was acquired by the Trust in 1987, its first geological nature reserve.

Flowers, such as cowslip, knapweed, oxeye daisy, and fragrant orchid, grow on the former quarry floor and spoil heaps, attracting butterflies and other insects.

There is an interpretive trail around the quarry.The quarry is also an EarthCache.

=== Geology ===
The rocks exposed by the quarry were laid down about 350 million years ago during the Carboniferous period. The area was a warm tropical sea; dead sea creatures were deposited here, in the North Staffordshire Basin, where water was deeper and moved slowly. About 290 million years ago the area was uplifted above sea level.

Milldale limestone, found at this quarry, is not seen in many other places in the Peak District; for this reason it is a Site of Special Scientific Interest. Deposits accumulated in fairly still water, depth about 300 metres (980 ft), and are more finely grained than limestone deposited in shallower, faster moving water.
