= Trackable (geocaching) =

Traveling item used in Geocaching

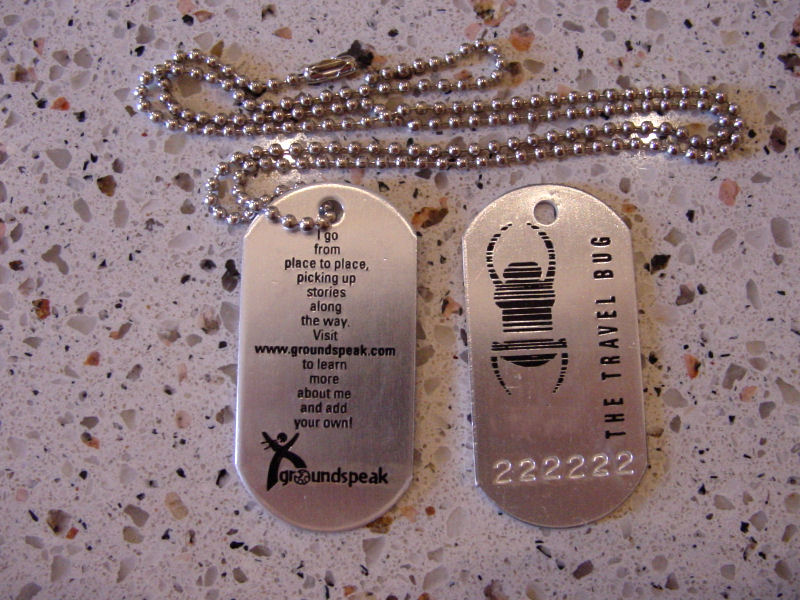
The front and back of an official Groundspeak Travel Bug

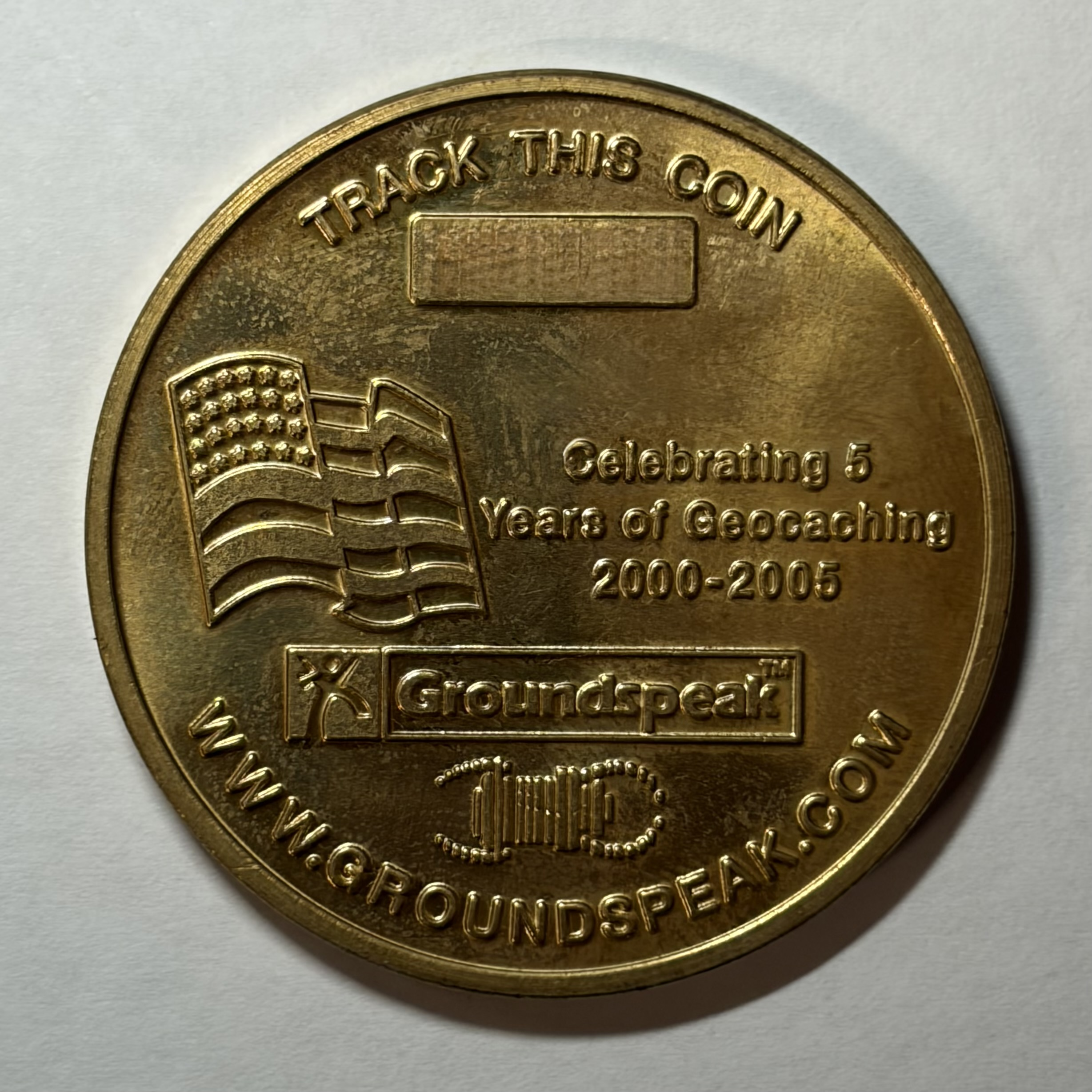
The frontside of a United States geocoin

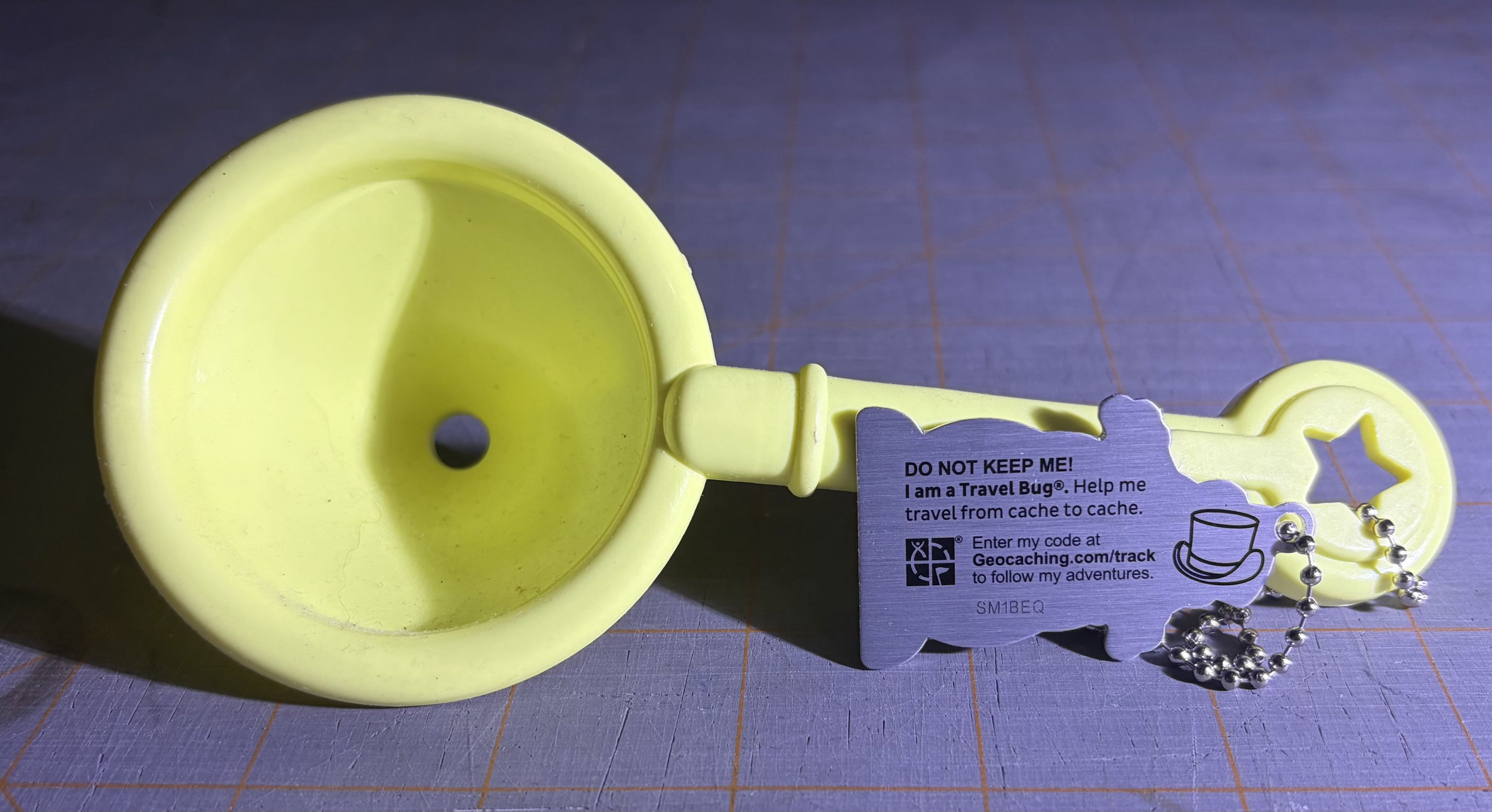
A Travel Bug attached to a hitchhiker with tracking number "SM1BEQ"

A trackable is a traveling item used in geocaching. Trackables are moved from cache to cache, with unique tracking numbers allowing these movements to be tracked through the geocaching website. They are usually fastened to an object, known as a "hitchhiker", before being released into a cache. The main types of trackables are Travel Bugs and geocoins. Travel Bugs and geocoins have different origins, with Travel Bugs being created by geocaching co-founder Jeremy Irish, and geocoins being created by Jon Stanley.

Trackables have been used in commercial promotions, such as advertising Jeep products and increasing diabetes awareness. Trackables have been to outer space, first in 2008, then in 2013, and finally in 2020. A free tracking service known as Geokrety is also available, but is not affiliated to Groundspeak.

== Description ==
Trackables are stamped with their unique tracking number. A trackable can be attached to another item. These attached items are called "hitchhikers". The owner then creates a name and a mission for the trackable, such as "to travel as far as possible" or to travel to a specific cache or location. On Geocaching.com, each trackable has an individual page which tracks its movement and calculates the distance traveled.

A trackable moves when a geocacher picks it up and physically moves them from one geocache to the next. The geocacher then places it inside another cache, logging its movement online through the geocaching app. Alternatively, there is an option for the trackable to be "discovered" if the geocacher does not wish to pick it up.

A geocoin is a type of trackable, being a token or coin made by a geocacher or a group of geocachers as a signature item.

Trackables are susceptible to going missing, such as someone taking the trackable but not logging it online or a cache containing a trackable being destroyed.

== Origins ==
=== Travel Bugs ===
The first Travel Bug was released by Jeremy Irish (the co-founder of Groundspeak, the parent company of Geocaching) on August 30, 2001, titled "Deadly Duck: Envy". The Travel Bug was attached to a rubber duck with devil horns. Irish also released six other Travel Bugs all centered around the seven deadly sins, being sloth, pride, gluttony, lust, wrath, and greed. (The greed Travel Bug was placed in a cache that was never published.)

=== Geocoins ===
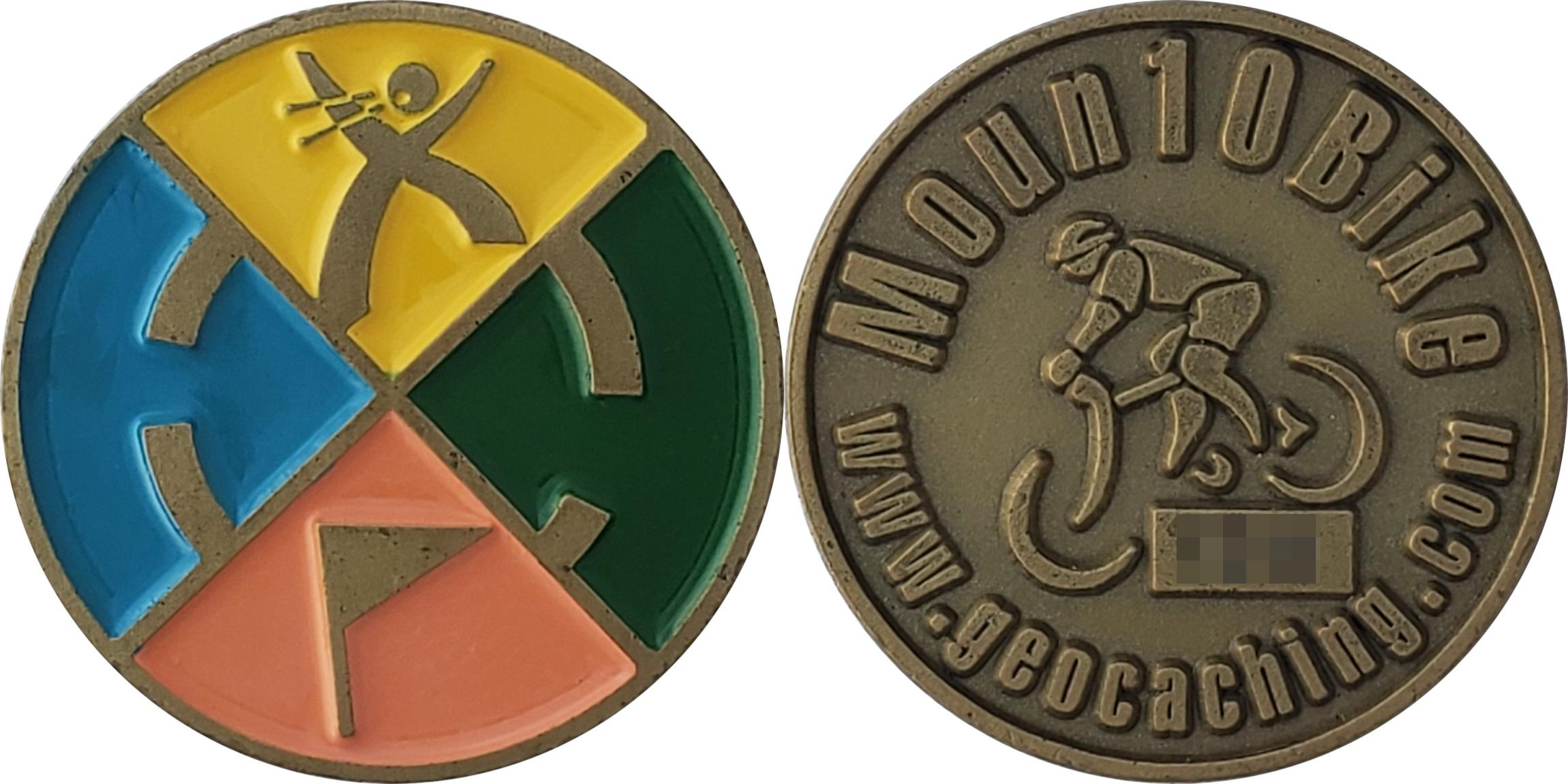
A version one Moun10Bike geocoin

The first geocoin was created by Jon Stanley (geocaching name Moun10Bike). Wanting a signature item for his 100th geocache find, Stanley created the geocoin, inspired by military challenge coins. He placed the first geocoin in his collection, and placed the second one in a geocache on September 30, 2001. Around six months later, more people started to mint coins. Eventually, geocoins became "desired items", so people would try and get to a cache first to grab the geocoin.

== Trackable Promotions ==
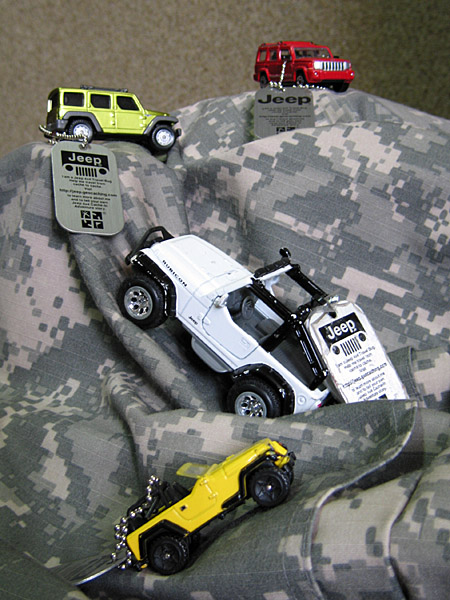
Jeep Travel Bugs. From bottom to top: 2004 Yellow Jeep TB #2155, 2005 White Jeep TB "Marly," 2006 Green Jeep TB "Venable Peak (CO)," 2007 Red Jeep TB "North River (MN)."

=== Jeep ===
From 2004 to 2007, Jeep sponsored a contest, known as the "Jeep 4×4 Geocaching Challenge", when one of Jeep's advertising clients, Rodale, reached out to Groundspeak wanting to do a partnership. The Travel Bugs were tied to a sweepstakes, with the prizes being three Jeep vehicles. There was also a separate photo and essay contest. In 2004, yellow Jeep Wrangler Travel Bugs were released, followed by approximately 5,000 white Jeep Wrangler Rubicon Travel Bugs in 2005, approximately 5,500 green Jeep Rescue concept vehicle Travel Bugs in 2006, and approximately 8,000 red Jeep Commander Travel Bugs in 2007.

=== International Diabetes Federation ===
In late 2006, to promote diabetes awareness and to gather support for a United Nations resolution, the International Diabetes Federation disseminated 20,000 "Unite for Diabetes" Travel Bugs to be released by volunteers around the world. Unlike the Jeep Travel Bugs, each Unite for Diabetes Travel Bug has a specific mission. Every individual Travel Bug was assigned a specific target city. It then travels to and around its assigned city to spread awareness for diabetes. Specially made geocoins were also created for release in 2007.

== Trackables in Space ==
=== Trip by Richard Garriott ===
Richard Garriott traveled to the International Space Station with a Travel Bug on October 12, 2008. Along with the Travel Bug, Garriott hid a geocache on the station in locker 218 of the Russian segment of the station, placing the Travel Bug inside it. The Travel Bug was picked up by Astronaut Michael Barratt and brought back to Earth. The Travel Bug has since been on display at Geocaching Headquarters in Seattle, Washington.

=== Trip by Richard Mastracchio ===
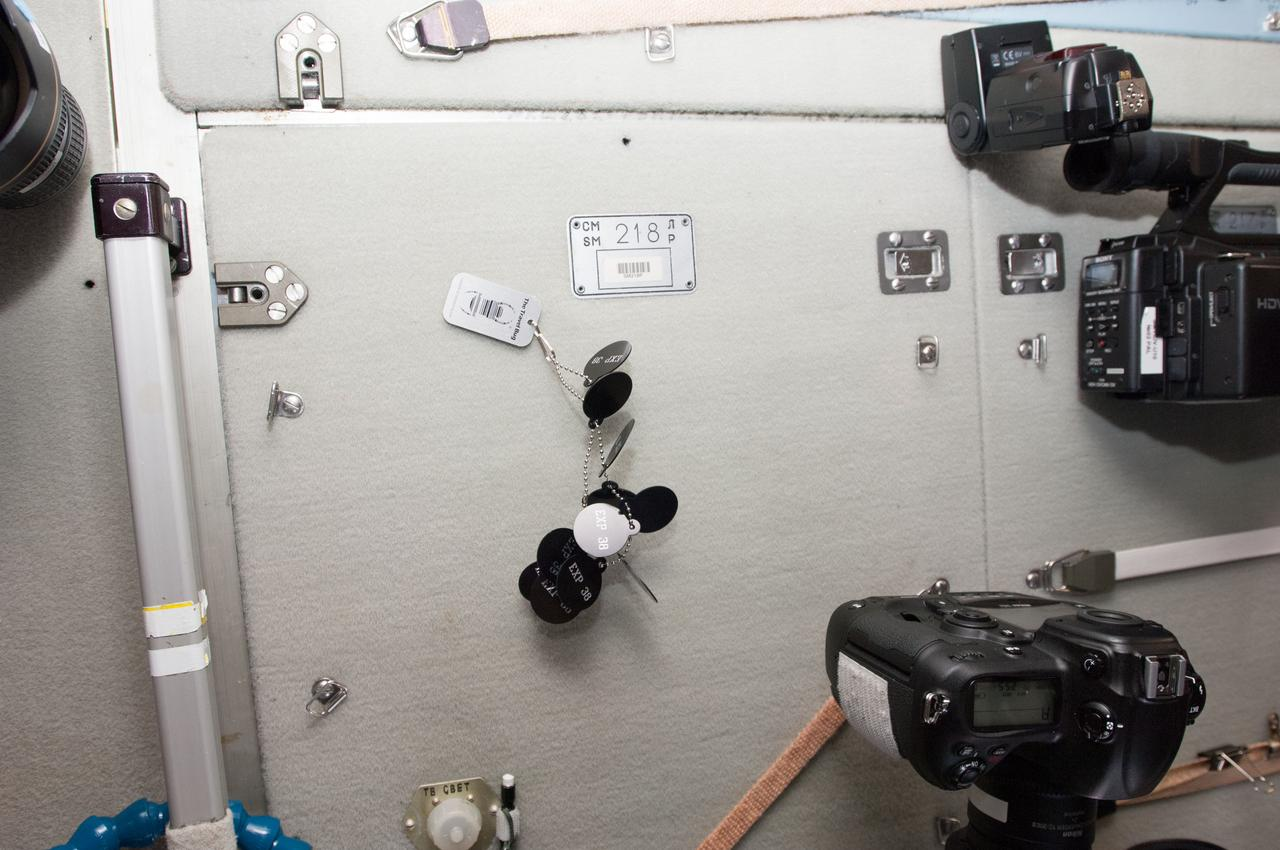
Mastracchio's Travel Bug on the International Space Station, in front of the panel that contains the geocache.

Astronaut Richard Mastracchio traveled to the International Space Station with a Travel Bug on November 6, 2013 during Expedition 38. The event was organized by geocacher Robert Cizaukas (geocaching name Cizzors) and sponsored by the Waterbury Police Activity League. The Travel Bug was given to Mastracchio in September by a 5th grade class at Chase Elementary School in Waterbury, Connecticut as a way to teach them and 11 other schools in Waterbury about space travel. The Travel Bug had 11 hitchhiker tags labeled "EXP 38" attached to it, representing the schools participating in the event, although 12 were participating. Groundspeak allowed geocachers to host events on the launch date to celebrate. The Travel Bug was in space for six months until the return flight on May 13, 2014. During the trip, Mastracchio was first to find (FTF) Garriott's cache. His online log writes:

"The geo space bug (TB5JJN1) has made it to the Russian Service Module, panel 218. He traveled from Waterbury, CT to Houston, TX to Cologne, Germany to Moscow, Star City Russia, to Baikonur Kazakhstan where it launched on a Russian Soyuz Rocket to the International Space Station. He has traveled around the space station and will continue to do so for the next 6 months. When he is not traveling he will be staying with me in my very small crew quarters. He hangs/floats on my wall and waits for more adventures while I do research and perform experiments here on ISS. Thanks for getting this little guy started Cizzors. Every journey starts with the first step and you took the first step of this one.”

— Richard Mastracchio

=== Mars Perseverance Rover ===
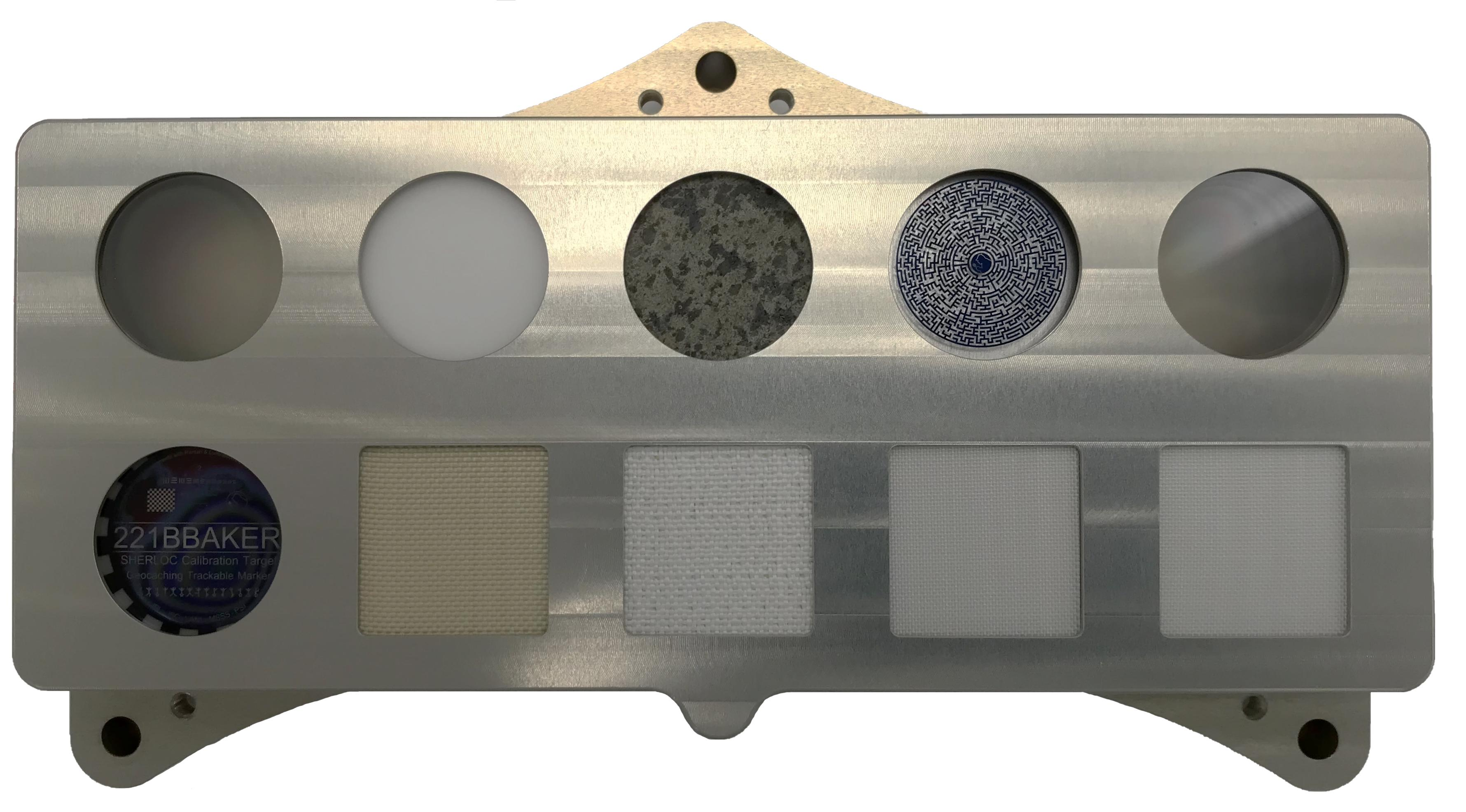
The Mars Perseverance Rover SHERLOC Calibration Target. The bottom-left corner contains the trackable.

A trackable was on Perseverance Rover, attached to the "Scanning Habitable Environments with Raman and Luminescence for Organics & Chemicals" (SHERLOC), a robotic arm of the rover. Also attached to the arm was space suit materials and a Martian meteorite. The idea to incorporate geocaching and the rover was brought up by NASA worker Dr. Marc Fries and his son, Wyatt in 2016. They wanted help from someone else who geocached, so they brought Dr. Francis McCubbin. They originally wanted to hide a geocache on Mars, but they decided otherwise because no one would find it. They also had the idea of hiding an EarthCache on Mars, but after talking to Matt Dawson (the Education Programs Manager at the Geological Society of America), they figured a Mars EarthCache would break the guidelines for EarthCaches. Dawson was able to get McCubbin in touch with Groundspeak, and they came up with the final idea of placing a trackable on the Perseverance Rover. The trackable code was carefully printed on a one-inch, polycarbonate glass disk serving as part of the rover's calibration target. The disk is made of a prototype astronaut helmet visor material tested for its potential use in crewed missions to Mars. Designs were approved by NASA's Jet Propulsion Laboratory (JPL), NASA Public Affairs, NASA HQ, and Groundspeak. The rover was sent to Mars on July 30, 2020.

== Other Aspects ==
=== Travel Bug hotels ===
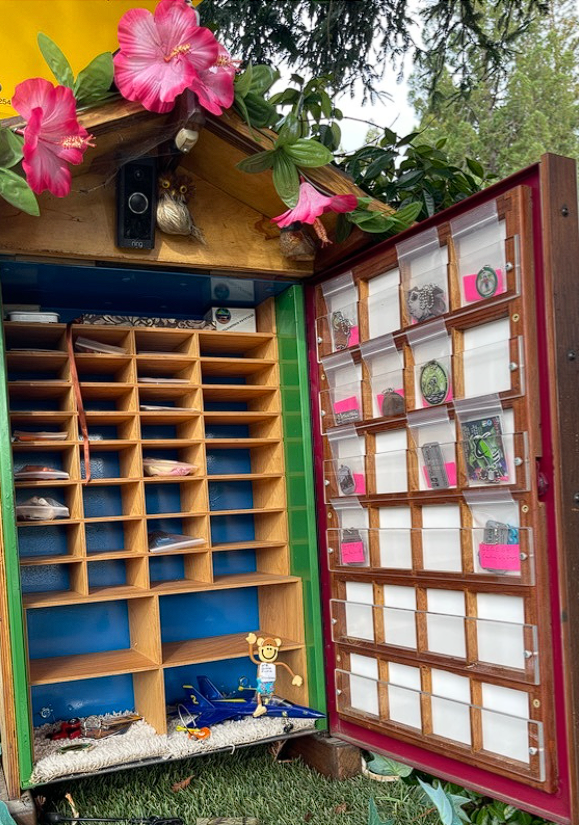
A Travel Bug hotel located in California, United States

Travel Bug hotels are geocaches made specifically to house trackable items. They serve as a point for trackables to be picked up and dropped off. Owners of these geocaches often make a unique theme for the hotel, add decorations, or make dioramas or scenes within the cache.

=== Travel Bug racing ===
Trackables can be used in Travel Bug racing, in which a group of geocachers release bugs on the same day with the objective of either traveling the longest distance or to score points by completing specific objectives.

=== Trackable tattoos ===
Some geocachers have "made themselves trackable" by getting a tattoo of a tracking number. Groundspeak offers a unique trackable icon to people who have a trackable tattoo, first requiring the geocacher to email an image of the tattoo to Groundspeak before the icon can be changed. Since 2020, there have been over 700 geocachers who have a trackable tattoo.

== Gallery ==
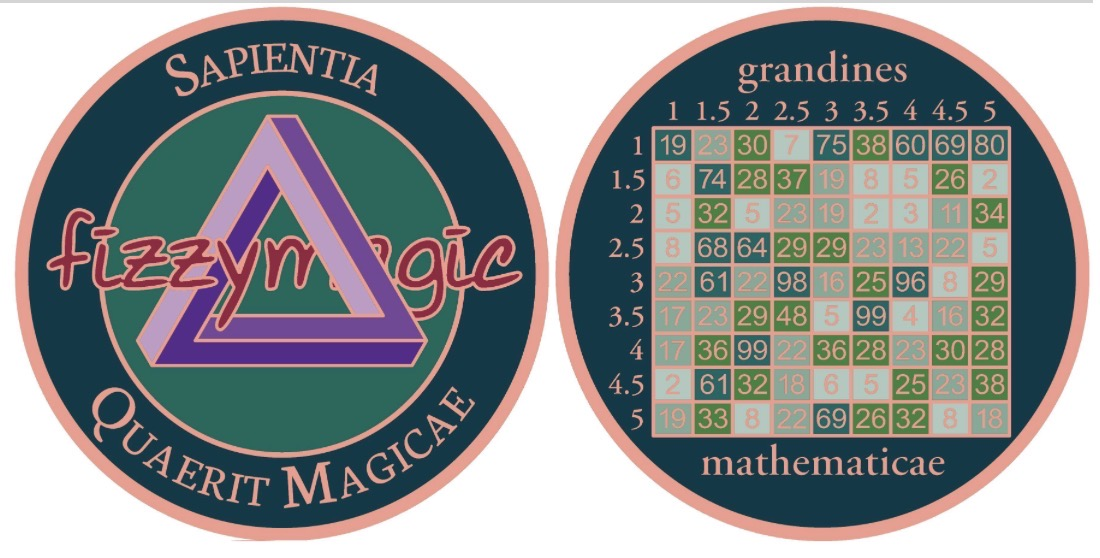
A signature geocoin made by geocacher FizzyMagic

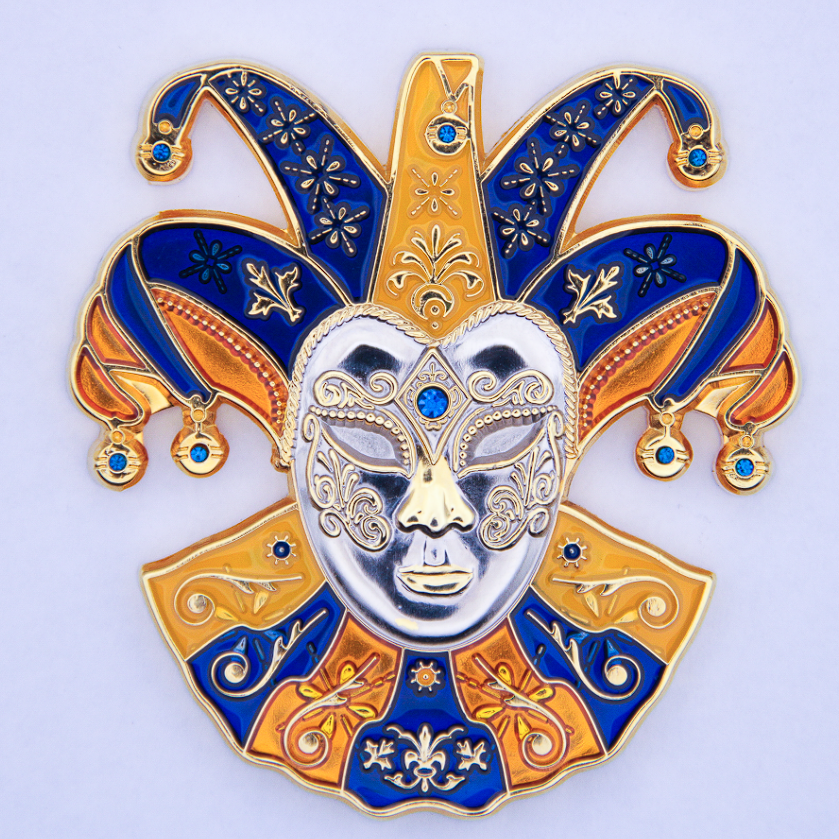
Geoswag Mardi Gras geocoin

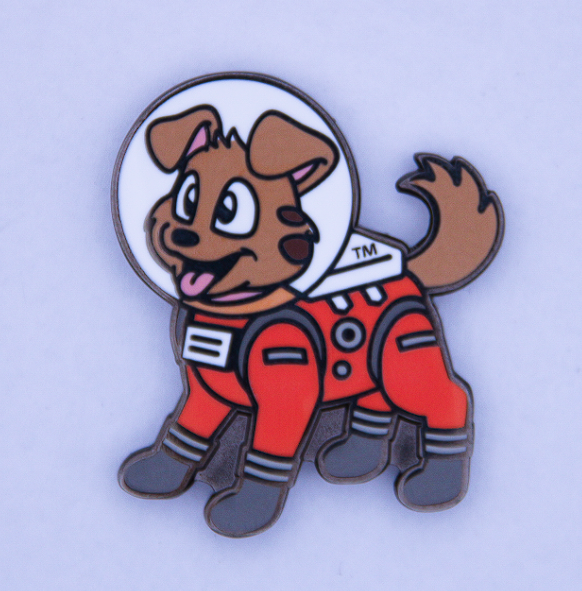
A mini Tracker the Geodog geocoin

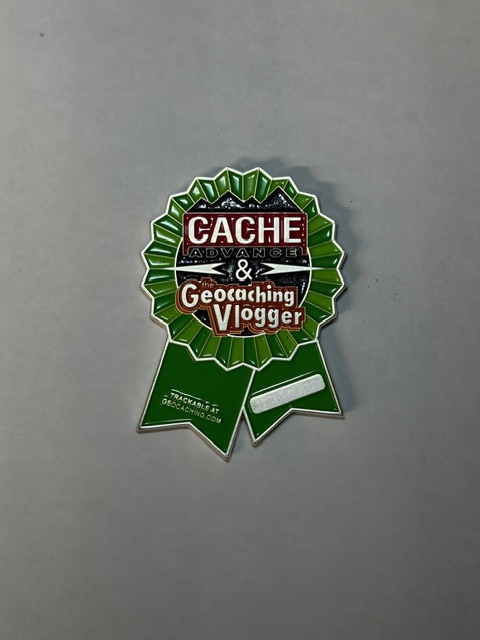
A geocoin awarded for completing a geocaching challenge

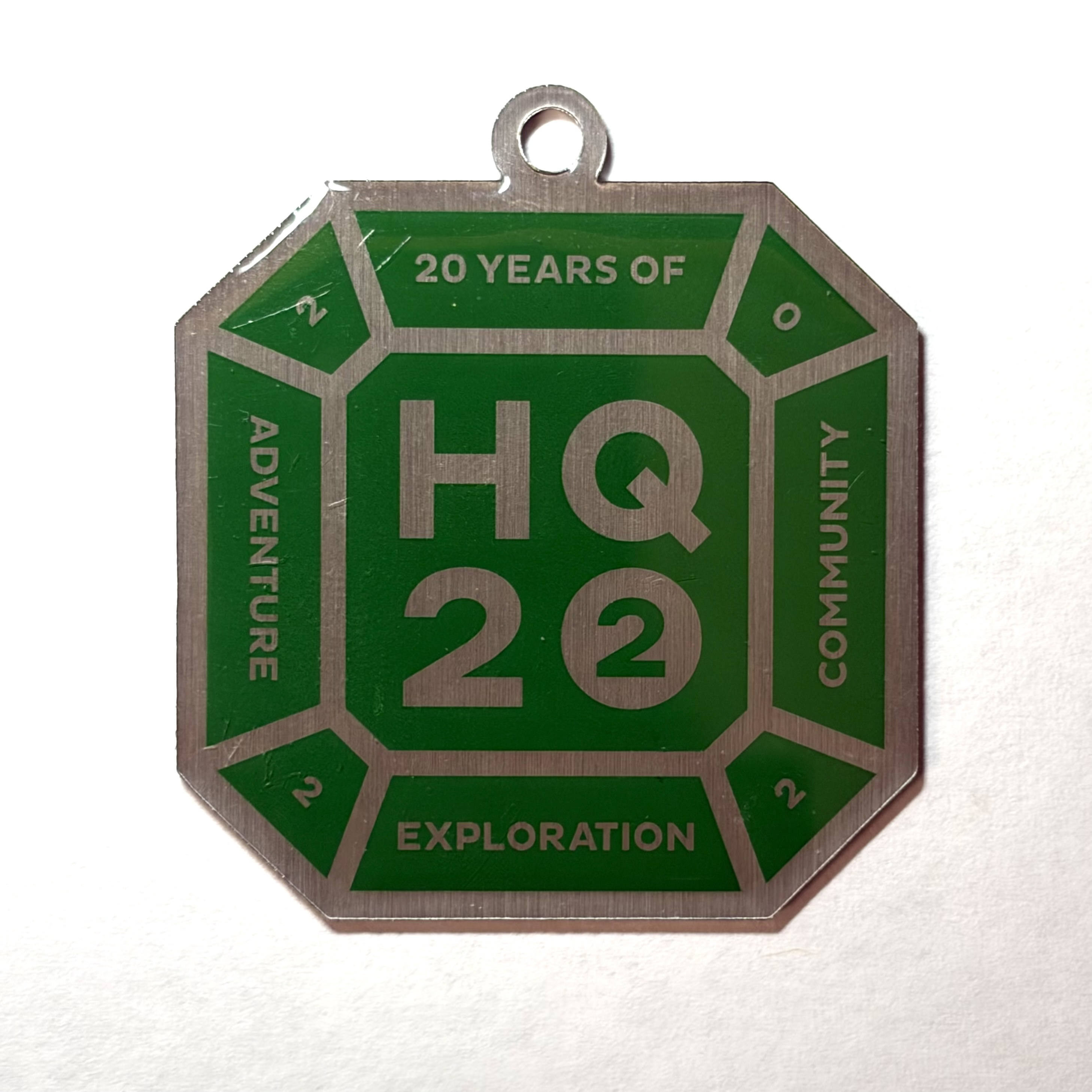
A Travel Bug made for Geocaching's 20th Anniversary

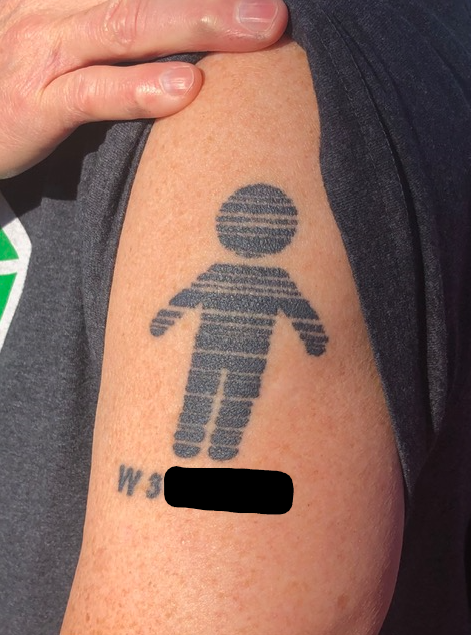
A trackable tattoo
