= Ipstones railway station =

Former railway station in Staffordshire, England

Ipstones
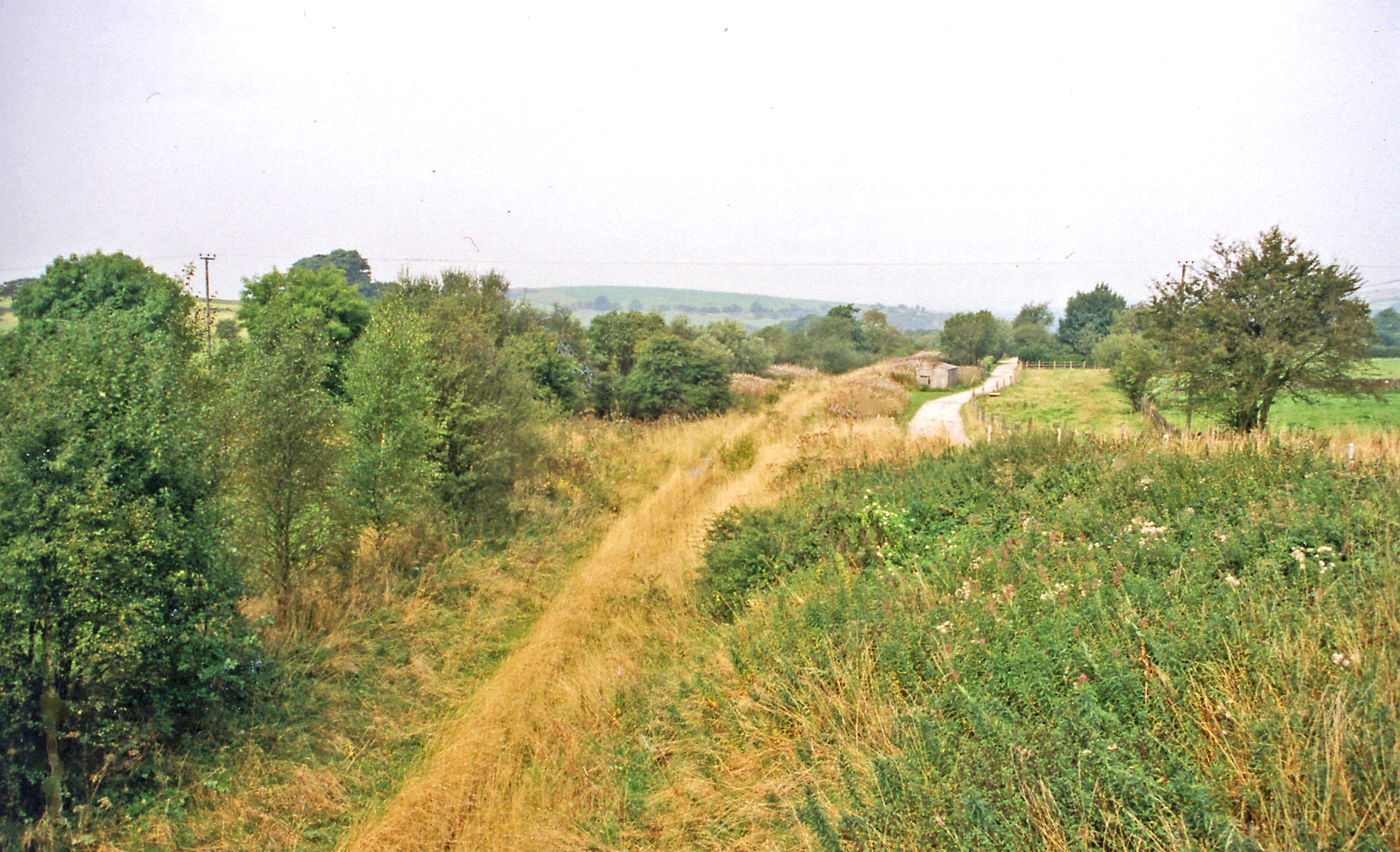
- The site of the station in 1999

General information
- Location: Ipstones, Staffordshire Moorlands, England
- Coordinates: 53.0671°N 1.9562°W
- Grid reference: SK030522
- Platforms: 1

Other information
- Status: Used (heritage railway)

History
- Original company: North Staffordshire Railway
- Post-grouping: London Midland and Scottish Railway

Key dates
- 5 June 1905: Opened
- 30 September 1935: Closed to passengers
- 4 May 1964: Closed to freight
Location

Ipstones railway station served the village of Ipstones, in Staffordshire, England. It was opened by the North Staffordshire Railway (NSR) in 1905; it was closed to passenger use in 1935, but remained open to freight traffic until 1964. The station was situated around 1.5 miles (2.4 km) north of the village centre, in the hamlet of Blakelow.

== Construction and opening ==
The station was on the NSR branch from Leekbrook Junction to Waterhouses. The single line branch was authorised on 1 March 1899 by the Leek, Caldon Low and Hartington Light Railways Order, 1898, and construction took several years.

The station at Ipstones was just before the summit of the line, which was also the highest point on the NSR, at 1,000 feet (304.8 m) above sea level.

== Station layout ==
The station had a single platform and limited goods facilities. A passing loop was installed and Ipstones was a block section, with Bradnop and Caldon Junction signalboxes.

In NSR days, the station staff comprised a station master, one porter and two porters/signallers.

== Closure ==
The branch line was never a financial success and passenger services were withdrawn on 30 September 1935. The station remained open for goods until May 1964, when all traffic on the branch was withdrawn, except for mineral worksings from Caldon Low quarries.

== Post-closure ==
Mineral trains to Caldon Low continued until 1989, when the line was mothballed. The buildings were demolished, although the station house still stands. In 2009, Moorland and City Railways purchased the line with the intention of reopening the line to mineral traffic from the quarry.

In 2014, this plan was placed on hold as the Competition Commission ruled that Lafarge Tarmac must sell one of its sites, possibly Caldon Low, so the heritage Churnet Valley Railway are seeking to purchase the line.

The Churnet Valley Railway ran the first services to Caldon Lowe in 2010 and reopened the loop at Ipstones in February 2014.

== The site today ==
The site is used as a run-around loop for trains on the Churnet Valley Railway; there are plans to open a new station on the site.

Regular services now terminate at Ipstones loop throughout the year.

== Route ==
Preceding station	Historical railways	Following station
Winkhill	North Staffordshire Railway; Waterhouses branch	Bradnop
