= Calton, Staffordshire =

Village in Staffordshire, England

Coordinates: 53.049°N 1.847°W

Calton
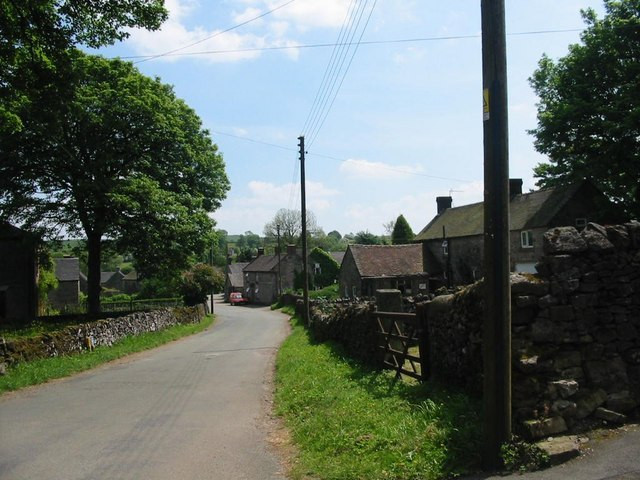
- The village of Calton

- Location within Staffordshire
- Civil parish: Waterhouses
- District: Staffordshire Moorlands
- Shire county: Staffordshire
- Region: West Midlands
- Country: England
- Sovereign state: United Kingdom

Calton is a village and a former parochial chapelry and civil parish, now in the parish of Waterhouses, in the Staffordshire Moorlands district of Staffordshire, England. In 1931 the parish had a population of 222. The chapelry contained the four parishes of Croxden, Blore, Mayfield, and Waterfall. In 1866, the four parishes became the civil parish of Calton, and on 1 April 1934 the parish was abolished to form Waterhouses. The village of Calton stands in the old parish of Mayfield, along with the chapel of St Mary.

The Peak District Boundary Walk runs through the village.

== See also ==
- Listed buildings in Waterhouses, Staffordshire
