= Listed buildings in Waterhouses, Staffordshire =

Waterhouses is a civil parish in the district of Staffordshire Moorlands, Staffordshire, England. It contains 46 listed buildings that are recorded in the National Heritage List for England. Of these, three are at Grade II*, the middle of the three grades, and the others are at Grade II, the lowest grade. The parish consists of the village of Waterhouses and the surrounding area, including the settlements of Calton, Cauldon, and Waterfall. The area is rural and most of the listed buildings are houses and associated structures, cottages, farmhouses and farm buildings. The other listed buildings include the ruins of a former large house, churches and items in churchyards, stocks and a pump on a village green, public houses, and a series of mileposts along the A523 road.

== Key ==
Grade	Criteria
II*	Particularly important buildings of more than special interest
II	Buildings of national importance and special interest

== Buildings ==
Name and location	Photograph	Date	Notes	Grade
Throwley Old Hall remains 53.06983°N 1.83634°W		Early 16th century	The former large house is in limestone with quoins and is in ruins. It has a rectangular plan, with two storeys and an attic, and at the northeast corner is a projecting three-storey square tower with an octagonal turret. Most of the windows have Tudor arched heads, some have ogee heads, there is a later mullioned window, and the doorways also have Tudor arches. The building is also a scheduled monument.	II*
Ivy Cottage, Caldon; 53.04890°N 1.84574°W	—	17th century	A pair of houses later combined into one, it is in stone with quoins and a tile roof. There are two storeys and an attic, and a T-shaped plan, consisting of a front range of four bays, and a rear wing. The doorway to the left has a bracketed hood, and the doorway to the right has a massive lintel. The windows are mullioned, most with hood moulds, and there is a blocked circular window and a blocked lozenge-shaped light.	II
Orchard Farmhouse and cowhouse 53.04230°N 1.87975°W		17th century	The farmhouse was extended in the 18th century, altered in the 19th century, and has since been used for other purposes. The original part is in stone with quoins, and the extension is in brick with stone dressings, the roofs are tiled, and there are two storeys. The original part has three bays, and contains sash windows with wedge lintels, chamfered mullioned windows, and casement windows. The extension has three bays, a moulded plinth, a moulded storey band, a moulded eaves band, mullioned and sash windows, and a doorway with a moulded architrave and a cornice hood. The former cowhouse has one storey, three bays, and casement windows.	II
Redmorlee Farmhouse; 53.05262°N 1.89700°W	—	17th century	The farmhouse, which was remodelled in the 19th century, is in stone with quoins, and has a tile roof with coped verges on shaped kneelers. There are two storeys and an attic, and an L-shaped plan, consisting of a three-bay main block and a rear wing. The windows on the front are casements, and at the rear and in the left gable end are chamfered mullioned windows.	II
Shaw's Farmhouse; 53.04139°N 1.87481°W	—	17th century	The farmhouse, which was remodelled in the 18th century, is in stone with quoins, and has a tile roof with coped verges on kneelers. There are two storeys and an attic, and an L-shaped plan, with a front range of three bays, a rear wing, and a lean-to extension in the angle. In the centre of the front is a doorway with a moulded surround and a bracketed hood, and the windows on the front are sashes with moulded surrounds. At the rear is a chamfered mullioned window with a hood mould.	II
The Barracks; 53.07012°N 1.83761°W	—	17th century	Stables and groom's accommodation, and later a cowhouse, the building is in limestone with quoins and a tile roof. There are two storeys and seven bays. The building contains chamfered mullioned windows and doorways.	II
Memorial, Waterfall; 53.06196°N 1.87933°W	—	c. 1700	The memorial is in the churchyard of Church of St James and St Bartholomew, and is in gritstone. It consists of a rectangular chest tomb, and has a heavy oversailing cap.	II
Caltonmoor House; 53.03573°N 1.82995°W	—	Early 18th century	A farmhouse in roughcast limestone with quoins and a tile roof. There are three storeys and a cellar, and an L-shaped plan, with a three-bay front and a rear wing. In the centre is a doorway with a flat bracketed hood, in the middle of the top floor is a lunette, and the other windows are casements. In front of the house are two segmental-headed cellar entrances.	II
Old Hall Farmhouse; 53.06094°N 1.87915°W	—	Early 18th century	The farmhouse is in limestone, and has a tile roof with coped verges. There are two storeys and an attic, two bays, and a two-storey single-bay extension in red brick to the right. In the centre is a doorway with a Tudor arch, the windows are mullioned, and in the gable ends are round-headed attic windows.	II
Fieldhead, Calton; 53.04907°N 1.83549°W	—	1743	The farmhouse was later extended to the west, and is in limestone with a tile roof. The original part has three storeys and two bays, and the extension has two storeys and one bay. Most of the windows have chamfered mullions and hood moulds, those in the top floor of the main block have single lights, and there is a casement window in the extension.	II
Bank House, Calton; 53.04962°N 1.85054°W	—	1743	The house is in limestone with quoins, and has a tile roof with coped verges. There are three storeys, three bays, a single-storey flat-roofed extension to the right, and a single-storey lean-to extension to the left. In the centre is a doorway with a pediment, above it is a datestone, and the windows are mullioned casements.	II
Cheshire House and stable 53.05463°N 1.88321°W	—	Mid-18th century	The house is in stone with quoins, a storey band, a moulded eaves band, and a tile roof with coped verges on kneelers. There are two storeys, three bays, and a lower two-storey two-bay extension to the right. The central doorway has a bracketed hood, above it is a circular window, there is a stair window with transoms at the rear, and the other windows are casements. To the left, the stable has two storeys and two bays, with a single-storey lean-to extension to the left.	II
Church Farmhouse; 53.04243°N 1.88397°W	—	18th century	The farmhouse, later a private house, is in stone with quoins, coved eaves, and a tile roof with coped verges. There are two storeys, and a T-shaped plan with a front range of three bays, and two parallel gabled rear wings. The windows have three lights and chamfered mullions. At the rear is a doorway with pilasters and a fanlight with radial glazing bars, and a cart shed entrance.	II
Church Farmhouse and cowhouse 53.04278°N 1.88447°W	—	18th century	The building consists of a farmhouse with a cowhouse attached to the left and a cottage to the right. It is in stone with quoins, coved eaves, and a tile roof with coped verges. The farmhouse has three storeys and three bays, a central doorway with a moulded hood mould, and mullioned windows. The cowhouse has three bays, a single-story extension to the left, blocked doorways with inserted windows, and a casement window. The cottage has two storeys and one bay, a doorway, a mullioned window, and a casement window.	II
Ivy House; 53.05980°N 1.88184°W	—	Mid-18th century	A stone house with quoins, a front in red brick, dentilled eaves, and a tile roof with coped verges. There are two storeys and three bays, and the windows are mullioned with three lights.	II
Cowhouse west of Leehouse Farmhouse; 53.04970°N 1.87860°W	—	18th century	The cowhouse is in limestone with quoins, an eaves band, and a tile roof with coped verges. There are two storeys and four bays, and a lean-to extension to the left. The cowshed contains windows and a blocked cart entrance with an inserted window.	II
Lytch Gate; 53.04209°N 1.88409°W	—	18th century	A stone cottage with quoins, a chamfered eaves band, and a tile roof. There are two storeys, and two gabled bays. The central doorway has a chamfered surround, the windows in the ground floor are casements, and in the upper floor they are two-light chamfered mullioned windows.	II
Cottage south of Lytchgate; 53.04149°N 1.88335°W	—	18th century	A pair of cottages, later combined into a house, it is in stone and has a tile roof with coped verges. There are two storeys and two bays. The right cottage has rusticated quoins and moulded eaves. The windows are casements.	II
Martinslow Farmhouse and outbuilding 53.06704°N 1.89635°W	—	18th century	The farmhouse is in stone with quoins and a tile roof. There are two storeys and two bays, with a rear outshut, and an outbuilding to the right. In the centre is a doorway, and the windows are chamfered mullioned casements.	II
Memorial, Cauldon; 53.04227°N 1.88453°W	—	18th century (probable)	The memorial is in the churchyard of the Church of St Mary and St Lawrence. It is a triple chest tomb in stone, and has a rectangular plan. The tomb has square panels with moulded edges and raised centres on the sides and the ends, a slightly oversailing cap with a moulded edge, and an inlaid slate inscription slab with an illegible inscription.	II
Musden Grange and stable 53.05861°N 1.81565°W	—	18th century	The farmhouse is in limestone, with quoins and a tile roof. It has an L-shaped plan, consisting of the house with a three-bay front range, a stable to the left, and a rear wing. The house has two storeys and an attic, and a doorway with a moulded surround and a hood mould. Most of the windows have chamfered mullions, those in the ground floor with hood moulds. To the left, an external fight of steps leads up to the loft door.	II
Cowhouse northeast of Shaw's Farmhouse; 53.04166°N 1.87430°W	—	18th century	The cowhouse is in stone with quoins, and has a tile roof with coped verges. There are two storeys, a front of six bays, and lean-to extensions at the rear. The cowhouse contains windows, doorways, some with inserted windows, and square loft openings.	II
Sundial, Waterfall; 53.06192°N 1.87924°W	—	18th century	The sundial is in the churchyard of Church of St James and St Bartholomew, and is in gritstone. It consists of a square tapering pedestal on two steps, and on the moulded head are a copper dial and gnomon.	II
Cottage southwest of The Nook; 53.06087°N 1.88070°W	—	18th century	A stone house with quoins and a tile roof. There are two storeys, two bays and a single-storey single-bay extension to the west. The windows in the main part have two lights and mullions, and in the extension they are casements.	II
The Old Beams Restaurant; 53.05065°N 1.88017°W	—	18th century	A stone house fronted in red brick, it has quoins, a moulded eaves band, and a tile roof with coped verges. There are two storeys and two bays, a lower two-storey two-bay extension to the right, and a single-storey projecting gabled wing. On the front is a gabled porch, a doorway with a chamfered surround, and mullioned windows containing casements.	II
Village Stocks, Waterfall; 53.06083°N 1.88038°W		18th century (probable)	The stocks are on the village green, and are in timber. They consist of two rectangular posts with four cross-pieces containing four holes.	II
Ye Olde Crown Hotel; 53.04904°N 1.87637°W	—	18th century	The public house is in limestone with quoins and a tile roof. There are two storeys, two parallel ranges, and a front of three bays. The public house contains gabled porches and chamfered mullioned windows.	II
Leehouse Farmhouse, wall and troughs 53.04977°N 1.87822°W	—	1751	The farmhouse is in limestone with sandstone dressings, rusticate quoins, a moulded eaves band, and a tile roof with coped verges. It is in Georgian style, and has three storeys, an L-shaped plan, consisting of a main range of three bays and a rear wing, and a single-storey lean-to on the left. The central doorway has a rusticated architrave, a raised keystone, and a pediment on brackets containing a board carved with the coat of arms of Queen Victoria. The windows are sashes in raised surrounds, in the lean-to is a fixed window, and at the rear is a stair window. The garden is enclosed by a stone wall with coping, and on the east side are a mounting block and two stone troughs.	II*
Slade House; 53.05626°N 1.84170°W		Late 18th century	A farmhouse in limestone, it has quoins, an eaves band, and a tile roof. There are two storeys and a cellar, and an L-shaped plan, with a main range of three bays and a rear wing. The windows have chamfered mullions, and the doorway at the rear has a chamfered lintel.	II
Thomas Harvey memorial, Cauldon; 53.04219°N 1.88476°W	—	1780	The memorial is in the churchyard of the Church of St Mary and St Lawrence and is to the memory of Thomas Harvey. It is a chest tomb in stone, and has a rectangular plan. The tomb has fluted corner pilasters, a cap with a moulded edge, and an inlaid slate inscription slab.	II
Church of St Mary and St Lawrence, Cauldon; 53.04231°N 1.88455°W		1781–84	The church, which incorporates earlier material in the chancel, is built in stone, and has roofs of tile and slate. It consists of a nave, a north aisle, a south porch, a chancel, a northwest vestry, and a west tower. The tower has two stages, a circular south window, a chamfered parapet band, and a low parapet with corner pinnacles. The windows in the body of the church have semicircular heads.	II
Church of St James and St Bartholomew, Waterfall; 53.06206°N 1.87923°W		1792	The church has a core dating from about 1200, and the chancel was rebuilt in 1890 using medieval masonry. It is built in limestone, and the chancel has a tile roof. The church consists of a nave, a south porch, a chancel, a north vestry, and a west tower. The tower has two stages, chamfered quoins, a circular west window, a blocked south window with a round head and a Gibbs surround, and an embattled parapet with crocketed corner pinnacles. The windows in the nave have round heads, and those in the chancel have pointed heads. Inside, the chancel arch is Norman, with zigzag decoration and saltire crosses, and above the south door is a Norman arch.	II*
Brook House; 53.06474°N 1.87800°W	—	Early 19th century	A limestone farmhouse with quoins and a tile roof. There are two storeys and an attic, and a T-shaped plan, consisting of a main range of three bays, a rear wing, and a lean-to extension in the angle. In the centre is a doorway, above it is a Venetian window, the windows to the left of it have chamfered mullions, and to the right they are sashes.	II
Donnithorne Chase; 53.05162°N 1.88331°W	—	Early 19th century	A house in rusticated stone with a hipped tile roof, it has a single storey, and a front of three bays. In the centre is a porch with a round-headed entrance, a raised keystone, a hood mould flanked by balustrades, and a parapet with finials. The outer bays contain chamfered mullioned windows. On the east front is a canted bay window.	II
Stony Rock; 53.04640°N 1.86141°W	—	Early 19th century	A red brick house with stone quoins, a dentilled eaves band, and a tile roof with coped verges. There are two storeys and an L-shaped plan, consisting of a main range of two bays and a rear wing. The doorway and the windows, which are casements, have segmental heads.	II
Sundial, Calton; 53.04900°N 1.84720°W	—	Early 19th century	The sundial is in the churchyard of St Mary's Church, and is in stone. It has an octagonal stepped base, a fluted pedestal, and a moulded head with a copper arm and plate and a gnomon.	II
The Nook; 53.06105°N 1.88038°W	—	Early 19th century	The house is in red brick with quoins, and a tile roof with coped verges. There are two storeys and an attic, and two bays. In the centre is a doorway, and the windows are casements with segmental heads.	II
Throwley Hall; 53.07009°N 1.83692°W		Early 19th century	A stuccoed farmhouse with a hipped slate roof, there are two storeys, a front of three bays, and a rear wing incorporating stables. In the centre is a Tuscan porch with ball finials, and a doorway with a rectangular fanlight and a pediment. The windows on the front are sash windows. The rear wing is in limestone with quoins and a tile roof. It contains chamfered mullioned windows and two stable doors.	II
Yew Tree Inn, Cauldon; 53.04077°N 1.88755°W		Early 19th century	The public house is in stone with rusticated quoins and a tile roof. There are two storeys, a main block of three bays, and a two-bay extension to the left. The door in the centre of the main block has a segmental pediment, above it is a Venetian window, and the other windows are casements with raised surrounds and Gothic glazing bars.	II
Milepost at N.G.R. SK 07265065; 53.05314°N 1.89323°W		1834	The milepost is on the south side of the A523 road. It is in cast iron, and consists of a cylindrical shaft and a head with two panels. On the panels are the distances to Leek and Ashbourne, on the shaft is the distance to London.	II
Milepost at N.G.R. SK 08685019; 53.04897°N 1.87199°W		1834	The milepost is on the south side of the A523 road. It is in cast iron, and consists of a cylindrical shaft and a head with two panels. On the panels are the distances to Leek and Ashbourne, on the shaft is the distance to London, and on the top is the date and the name of the manufacturer.	II
Milepost at N.G.R. SK 10004950; 53.04294°N 1.85242°W		1834	The milepost is on the southwest side of the A523 road. It is in cast iron, and consists of a cylindrical shaft and a head with two panels. On the panels are the distances to Leek and Ashbourne, on the shaft is the distance to London, and on the top is the date and the name of the manufacturer.	II
Milepost at N.G.R. SK 11414872; 53.03601°N 1.83136°W		1834	The milepost is on the south side of the A523 road. It is in cast iron, and consists of a cylindrical shaft and a head with two panels. On the panels are the distances to Leek and Ashbourne, on the shaft is the distance to London, and on the top is the date and the name of the manufacturer.	II
St Mary's Church, Calton; 53.04906°N 1.84725°W		1839	The church is built in limestone and has a tile roof. It consists of a nave, a south porch, a chancel, and a northwest vestry. On the west gable end is a weatherboarded bellcote with a hipped roof. Above the porch door is a niche containing a statue of the Virgin Mary. The windows are lancets, the east window contains Y-tracery, and inside the church is a west gallery.	II
Gateways, gatepiers and gates, Church of St James and St Bartholomew; 53.06197°N 1.87851°W	—	c. 1840	At the entrance to the churchyard are stone octagonal piers with arcaded sides and embattled caps, and these are flanked by round-headed arches with embattled walls above. The decorative gates are in wrought iron.	II
Village pump and trough, Waterfall; 53.06065°N 1.88067°W		Late 19th century	The pump and trough are on the village green, and are in cast iron. The pump has a cylindrical stem with an enlarged fluted head, a curved handle and a spout, and the trough is in the form of an elongated octagon.	II
