= EarthCache =

Geocache type

An EarthCache (sometimes abbreviated to EC) is a geocaching cache type. EarthCaches do not have physical caches. Instead, to prove that the geocacher was at the location, EarthCaches require the geocacher finding it to answer questions based on an earth science lesson provided and through observations made at given coordinates. EarthCaches are monitored by the GSA, and new EarthCaches must pass a review by a reviewer from the GSA (known as geoawares) before being published. The first EarthCache was published in 2004 by the GSA Director of Education and Outreach, Gary Lewis (geocaching name geoaware), when the GSA wanted the general public interested in earth science. The GSA also has an "EarthCache Masters Program", allowing geocachers to receive digital badges based on how many EarthCaches they've hidden or found. As of 2024, there have been over 70,000 EarthCaches created.

== Description ==
Unlike other geocaches, Earthcaches do not have a physical cache at the posted coordinates. Instead, to prove that the geocacher was at the location, EarthCaches require the geocacher finding it to answer questions based on an earth science lesson provided and through observations made at the posted coordinates. EarthCaches may have one site, or it could have multiple sites. The geocacher sends their answers to the EarthCache owner, then logs their find online. Every EarthCache, like other geocaches, have a difficulty and terrain rating (D/T rating) listed on the cache page, with the difficulty signifying how hard the cache is to figure out or solve, and the terrain signifying how hard it is to get to the posted coordinates. EarthCaches are monitored by the GSA, and new EarthCaches must pass a review by a reviewer from the GSA (known as geoawares) before being published.

=== Guidelines ===
According to Groundspeak, EarthCaches must follow these ten guidelines:

1. EarthCaches must provide an earth science lesson
2. EarthCaches must be educational
3. EarthCaches must highlight a unique feature
4. EarthCaches must be placed in locations where geocachers are allowed to enter
5. An EarthCache can be a single site or multiple sites
6. Logging an EarthCache requires visitors to undertake site-specific tasks that provide a learning opportunity related to the topic
7. The EarthCache text and logging tasks must be submitted in the local language
8. Respect trademarks and copyright information and only use text, images, or logos if you have permission
9. EarthCache sites adhere to the principles and ethics of geocaching and Leave No Trace.
10. EarthCaches are submitted through Geocaching.com and must meet the EarthCache guidelines and adhere to the geocache hiding guidelines and the Geocaching Terms of Use

== Origin ==
At a 2003 GSA meeting, a discussion formed about how to get the general public interested in earth science. One of the members proposed the idea of collaborating with Groundspeak and incorporating earth science with geocaching. United States National Park managers didn't allow physical geocaches at the parks, but they were willing to allow EarthCaches because they didn't have containers and they taught earth science lessons. This allowed the EarthCache Program to be created, and in 2004, Gary Lewis—the GSA Director of Education and Outreach at the time (geocaching username geoaware)—hid the first EarthCache in New South Wales, Australia titled "Earthcache I - a simple geology tour of Wasp Head" (GCHFT2). The EarthCache gives a lesson about erosion and the history of the rocks found in the area.

== EarthCache Achievements ==
The EarthCache Masters Program is a program that awards digital badges to geocachers that participate in EarthCache activities. Lewis, wanting the effort of creating an EarthCache to have a reward, came up with the program. The levels are split into four tiers: Bronze, Silver, Gold, and Platinum. Each level requires the geocacher to find and hide a certain amount of EarthCaches, with the amount increasing per level. The GSA also has "Discovery Awards", earned based on the amount of EarthCaches a geocacher finds. Once a geocacher qualifies, they apply for the level on the GSA's website, and once they qualify they then add an icon to their geocaching profile page. The GSA also created trackables for each program, with trackables unique to each level. As of 2015, there have been a total of 21,617 geocachers who have participated in the Masters Program.
