= Waterhouses railway station (Staffordshire) =

Former railway station in England

Waterhouses
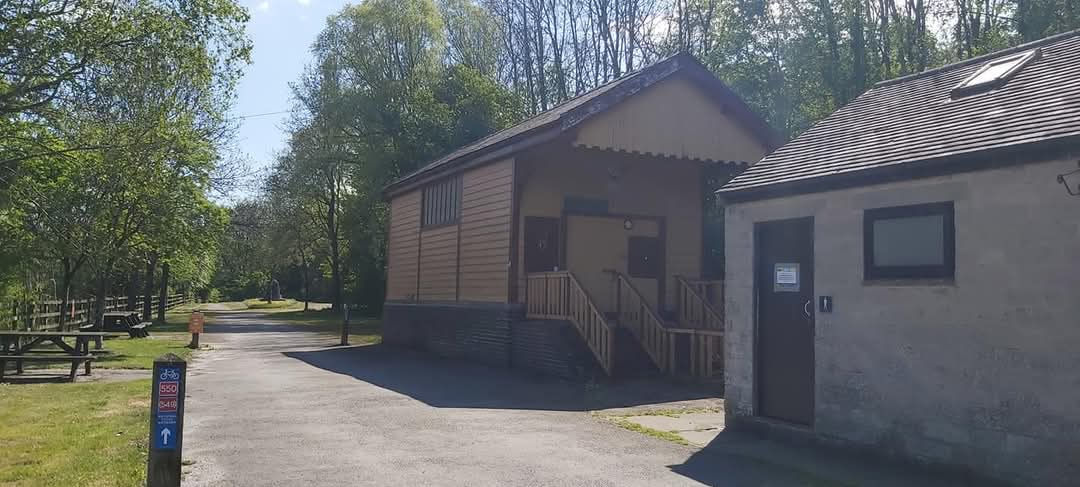
- Waterhouses station in 2020

General information
- Location: Waterhouses, Staffordshire Moorlands; England
- Coordinates: 53.0487°N 1.8742°W
- Grid reference: SK087501
- Platforms: 2

Other information
- Status: Disused

History
- Original company: North Staffordshire Railway; Leek and Manifold Valley Light Railway
- Post-grouping: London Midland and Scottish Railway

Key dates
- 29 June 1904: temporary station opened for L&MVLR trains
- 1 July 1905: Opened
- 12 March 1934: Closed to all traffic (L&MVLR)
- 30 September 1935: Closed to passengers (LMS)
- 1 March 1943: Closed to freight (LMS)
Location

Waterhouses railway station was a railway station that served the village of Waterhouses, Staffordshire, England. It was opened jointly by the North Staffordshire Railway (NSR) and the Leek and Manifold Valley Light Railway (L&MVLR) in 1905 and closed in 1943.

== Construction and opening ==
The station was the terminus of two separate railway lines; the 4 ft 8 1/2 in (1,435 mm) standard gauge NSR branch from Leekbrook Junction and the 2 ft 6 in (762 mm) narrow gauge L&MVLR from Hulme End. Both lines were authorised on 1 March 1899 by the Leek, Caldon Low, and Hartington Light Railways Order, 1898.

From Leekbrook junction, Waterhouses station was 8 miles 68 chains (8.85 miles, 14.24 km) distant. The branch rose until it reached a summit of 1,000 feet (304.8 m) near Ipstones making that the highest point on the NSR. From there the line fell until Waterhouses was reached at an elevation of 725 feet (221.0 m). The descent necessitated a steep gradient of 1 in 40 (2.5%) that ended only at the end of the station platform. The station itself was on a falling gradient of 1 in 260 (0.38%).

The other end of the L&MVLR at Hulme End was 8 miles 11 chains (8.14 miles, 13.10 km) away but construction of the L&MVLR proceeded faster than that of the NSR line. The L&MVLR used a temporary station located slightly to the east between its opening on 29 June 1904 and 1 July 1905 when the NSR line opened.

== Station layout ==
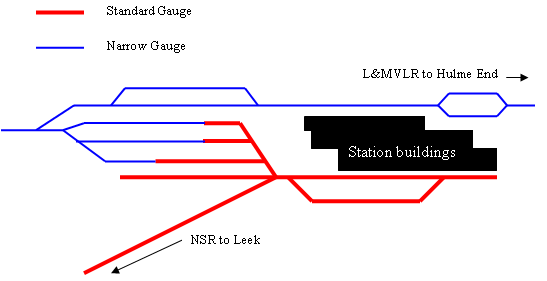
Sketch map of Waterhouses station (not to scale)

The two lines approached the station from opposite directions; the NSR from the west and the L&MVLR from the east. Each served a single platform which were back to back to each other but at different heights; the L&MVLR platform being lower than the NSR one. This resulted in the platforms being separated by railings to prevent passengers and staff falling off one onto the other.

The goods facilities were very basic and the main interest was the three interchange sidings allowing standard gauge wagons to be rolled off the end of the siding onto the transporter wagons used, uniquely in the United Kingdom, by the L&MVLR. The signal box, of 10 levers, situated at the Leek end of the NSR station controlled all the points and signals on the NSR line but only the home and starting signals on the L&MVLR. All the other signals and points on the L&MVLR were hand controlled. Apart from water columns on both lines, there were no other locomotive facilities. On the L&MVLR platform the platform sign simply read "Waterhouses" but only the NSR side they read "Waterhouses, alight for the Manifold Valley and Froghall Quarries"

In NSR days the station staff comprised a station master, two porters, a porter/signalman and a booking office clerk. The NSR employed a permanent way gang of five men as did the L&MVLR.

== Services ==
Passenger services were never high and the NSR ran three trains between Leek and Waterhouses, increasing to five on market days in Leek. These services were all matched by a L&MVLR service to Hulme End and in publication such as Bradshaws services were shown as through services, without mentioning the interchange at Waterhouses. On Sundays there was a single train each way.

Freight services were equally sparse with just one goods train per day from the station on market days and two on other days. The most important traffic between the two lines was milk from the creamery at Ecton, most of which was destined for London. In 1911 222,598 imperial gallons (1,011,950 L; 267,329 US gal) were brought in from the L&MVLR growing to 717,332 imperial gallons (3,261,060 L; 861,480 US gal) in 1922. Initially all the milk was carried in churns which had to be manhandled across the platforms but after the First World War the churns were loaded into standard gauge vans taken to and from Ecton on the transporter wagons. Eventually milk tankers were also used, again being transferred between Ecton and Waterhouses on the transporters. The importance of the milk traffic was such that between 1919 and 1926 a special milk train ran direct between Waterhouses and London, rather than the vans being shunted between various trains until the milk reached its ultimate destination.

== Closure ==
The L&MVLR was never a financial success and with the closure of the Ecton creamery in 1932 the line became even more uneconomic and closed on 12 March 1934, although the last train ran two days earlier. The passenger service to Leek lasted until the following year but was withdrawn on 30 September 1935. The station remained open as a goods station until 1943 when the line between Caldon Junction and Waterhouses closed entirely.

== The site today ==
The site of Waterhouses railway station is now the location for a cycle hire business located at one end of the Manifold Way – a trail constructed on the trackbed of the old L&MVLR.

In July 2013, the preserved Churnet Valley Railway announced the possible extension of its Cauldon Lowe branch line service to Waterhouses where the station could be reinstated as the future terminus of the newly resurrected part of the preserved line.

== Route ==
Preceding station	Historical railways	Following station
Caldon Low Halt	North Staffordshire Railway; Waterhouses branch	Terminus
Terminus	Leek and Manifold Valley Light Railway	Sparrowlee
