= Cauldon =

Village in Staffordshire, England

Coordinates: 53.041453°N 1.8823568°W

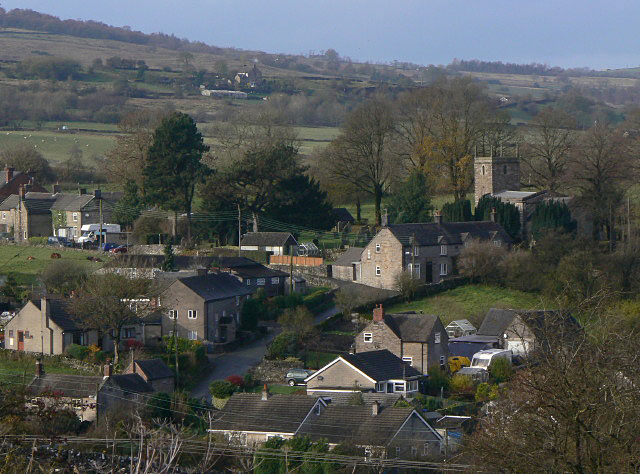

- Location within Staffordshire
- Civil parish: Waterhouses
- District: Staffordshire Moorlands
- Shire county: Staffordshire
- Region: West Midlands
- Country: England
- Sovereign state: United Kingdom
- Police: Staffordshire
- Fire: Staffordshire
- Ambulance: West Midlands

Cauldon or Caldon is a village and former civil parish, 19 miles (31 km) north east of Stafford, now in the parish of Waterhouses, in the Staffordshire Moorlands district, in the county of Staffordshire, England. In 1931 the parish had a population of 422.

== History ==
The name "Cauldon" means 'Calves' hill'. Cauldon was recorded in the Domesday Book as Caldone. On 1 April 1934 the parish was abolished to form Waterhouses.

== Features ==
Cauldon has a church called St. Mary and St. Laurence.
