= Geokrety =

Geocaching service

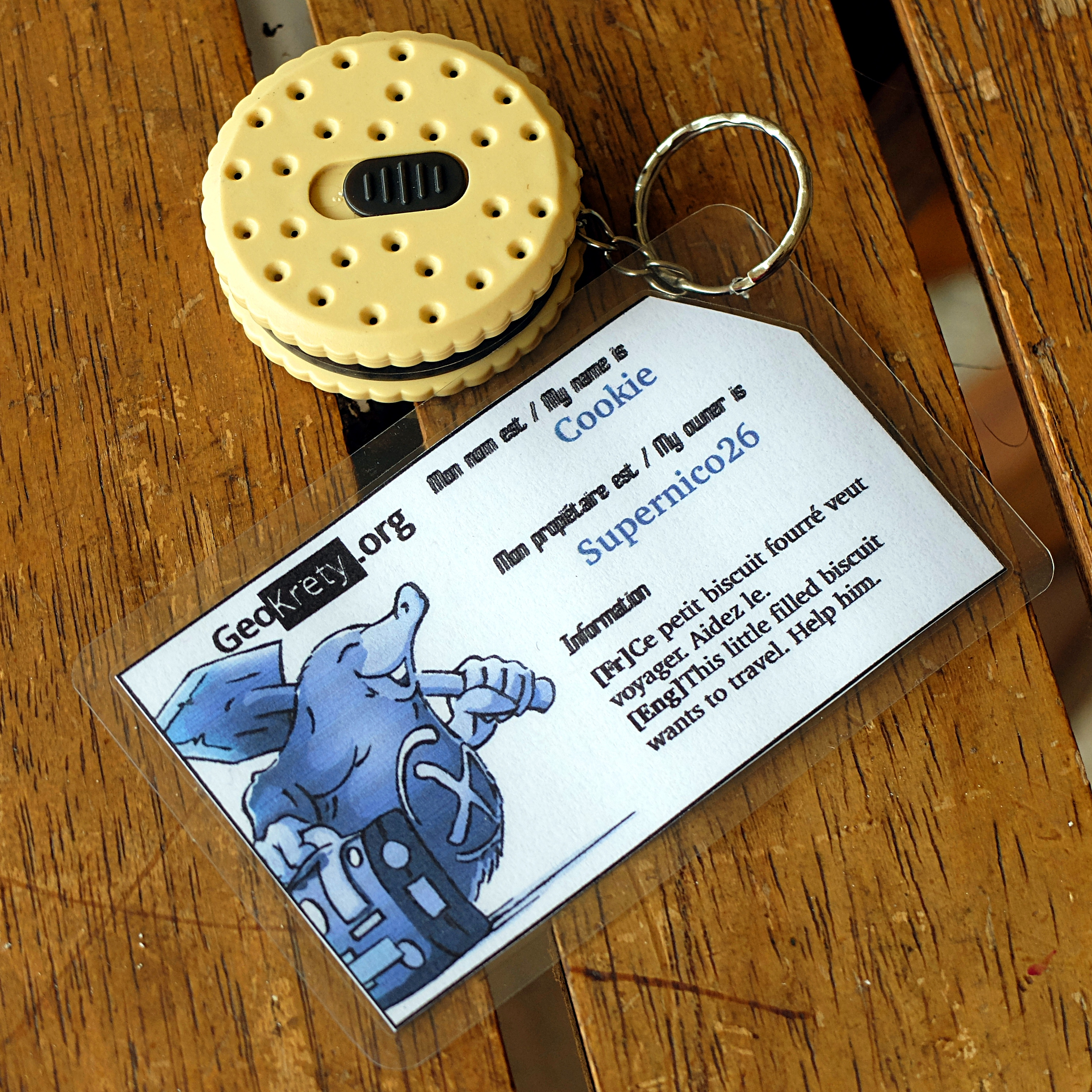
A GeoKret

GeoKrety (from Greek: geo, "earth" and Polish: krety, "moles") is an online tracking service targeted at Geocachers. Each registered object, called a GeoKret (plural: GeoKrety), has a unique tracking code, allowing its movements between locations such as Geocaches to be tracked and registered on the service. While the idea behind trackable items such as GeoKrety originated with the geocoin and travel bug, Geokrety is an independent trackable service that can be used with any geocaching activity.

== Description ==
A GeoKret can be anything, but in most cases it is a small puppet or other small toy, which can be placed in geocache containers. During the registration of a GeoKret on the website, the owner assigns a name and, optionally, a purpose or mission. These missions can be as simple as travelling as far as possible, or travelling to a specific cache, location or a certain type of location. On GeoKrety.org, each item has an individual page, which tracks its movement and calculates the distance travelled.

After registering, the owner must create a label for their GeoKret, with its name, mission, the Tracking Code and the website address. Optionally, the short user's manual and a QR code can be included. The label should then be protected against moisture, e.g. by laminating.

GeoKrety are not trade items, therefore it is not compulsory to put something in a cache to take a GeoKret, nor is it required to take something from a cache in exchange for a GK. If a geocacher wants to take something from a cache, they are obligated to make a trade before placing the GK. Furthermore, there is no obligation to pick up a GeoKret from a cache as users can simply mark the item as "discovered" on the website.

In order to log a move or discovery of a GeoKret, users are required to enter its Tracking Code and the location or cache where they left it. The cache can be identified by its waypoint, cache name (the coordinates are acquired automatically from most geocaching services) or by coordinates.

The service is free of charge. All content (including descriptions of GeoKrety, illustrations and log entries) made available by publishing them on the site is licensed under a Creative Commons license.

The service was founded in October 2007. and is operated by a group of volunteers. As of 8 January 2012 there were 20098 registered GeoKrety and 167009 log entries. All GeoKrety (excluding human-type) travelled 16579482 kilometres.

== Supported services ==
Geokrety are not associated with any particular geocaching service. Users are allowed to place GeoKrety in caches registered in any database, as well as in other locations (e.g. at home), in which case they are required to provide the coordinates.

In order to simplify logging of GeoKrety, the website fetches cache information (like a waypoint name, coordinates, description) from many popular geocaching services. For fully supported services, only a GeoKret's Tracking Code (printed in the label) and the cache's waypoint are required, as all other data (like the cache's title and coordinates) are completed automatically. As of 8 January 2012, there were 665997 waypoints (with full cache information) in the geokrety.org database.

When dropping a GeoKret into a cache listed at geocaching.com only, the coordinates must be entered manually. A browser plug-in for Mozilla Firefox and Google Chrome is available to automate this. A Free and open-source software android app, GeoKrety Logger, is available on F-Droid.

== Geokrety categories ==
Depending on its type, a GeoKret needs to be assigned one of the following categories:

- Traditional geokret (e.g. a puppet)
- Book
- CD or DVD
- Coin (for coin shaped Geokrety)
- Human (for users of this service tracking themselves)

== QR codes ==
Some GeoKrets have QR code printed on their labels, encoding their tracking code, After taking a photo and decoding the code, the user is automatically taken to the appropriate website to log a move of a GeoKret. Some fields are completed automatically according to information read from the QR code. No special application, except a QR code reader, is required for this task.

== See also ==
- Geocoin
- Travel Bug
