= Waterhouses, Staffordshire =

Village in Staffordshire, England

Coordinates: 53.0497°N 1.8762°W

Waterhouses
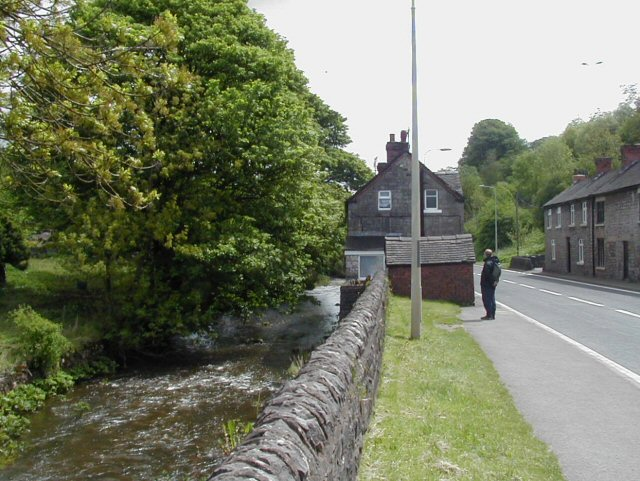
- River Hamps flowing through Waterhouses

- Location within Staffordshire
- Population: 1,134 (2011 Census)
- District: Staffordshire Moorlands
- Shire county: Staffordshire
- Region: West Midlands
- Country: England
- Sovereign state: United Kingdom
- Post town: Stoke-on-Trent
- Postcode district: ST10
- Police: Staffordshire
- Fire: Staffordshire
- Ambulance: West Midlands
- UK Parliament: Staffordshire Moorlands

Waterhouses is a village in the south of the Staffordshire Peak District in England. It is around 8 miles from Leek and Ashbourne, being nearly the halfway point between the two towns on the A523 road, which roughly follows the southern boundary of the Peak District National Park. Waterhouses is also a civil parish, created in 1934 when the parishes of Calton, Cauldon, Waterfall and part of Ilam were merged; previously the village of Waterhouses was on the boundary of Waterfall and Cauldon parishes. The hamlet of Winkhill is also in the parish. The population of the civil parish at the 2011 census was 1,134.

== Village ==
The village of Waterhouses is on the River Hamps, a tributary of the River Manifold, and at the southern end of the track of the former Leek and Manifold Valley Light Railway (now the Manifold Way, a walk- and cycle-path), which ran to Hulme End. Nearby is the Cauldon cement plant of Lafarge Cement, and a large Tarmac limestone quarry.

Waterhouses was served by a railway station opened by the North Staffordshire Railway on 1 July 1905, on the line from Leek to Waterhouses. Waterhouses was also served by a railway station which was opened by the Leek and Manifold Valley Light Railway on 27 June 1904, whilst being entirely operated by the North Staffordshire Railway. These two lines were next to each other. Due to the railway not being as successful as hoped and not utilised enough, it was later opened for tourists, but still failed to make a profit and was later closed and then turned into a cycle path.

Waterhouses situated on the A523 Leek to Ashbourne Road, near to Alton Towers and on the edge of the dramatic scenery of the Peak Park, is a popular place for visitors to the area. It offers a doorway to the beauty of the Peak District National Park, uninterrupted by traffic. via many footpaths or the aforementioned Manifold Way Cycle path and is also a common respite stop for visitors to Alton Towers. The Peak District Boundary Walk runs through the village. Brown End Quarry, a nature reserve of Staffordshire Wildlife Trust, is nearby.

The village is popular with tourists and has many great amenities available, The Crown – public house, a local Post Office, swimming baths, off licence / convenience store and the Riverside Cafe.

== See also ==
- Listed buildings in Waterhouses, Staffordshire
