= Waterhouses branch line =

Railway in Staffordshire, England

The Waterhouses branch line was a railway built by the North Staffordshire Railway to link the small villages east of Leek, Staffordshire with Leek, the biggest market town in the area. The railway opened in 1905 but closed to passengers in 1935. Freight continued on the line though until 1988, when the line was mothballed as the traffic from the quarries at Caldon Low ceased.

In 2009 a new company, Moorland and City Railways (MCR), was formed with the intention of re-opening the line for commercial freight traffic, and contracted with the local Churnet Valley Railway (CVR) to hold a series of re-opening events in November 2010. Since 2011 an agreement has been reached between the two companies that sees the CVR operate a heritage service along the branch, with MCR continuing negotiations over the return of freight traffic.

By October 2020 CVR had purchased the line from MCR and now runs regular services to Ipstones

== History ==
The history of the branch is closely linked with the history of the Leek and Manifold Valley Light Railway (LMVLR) as they were part of same proposal to bring the railways to this rural part of Staffordshire, although the promoters of the scheme and the NSR had different motives.

The area east of Leek was (and still is) a rural area consisting of upland hill farms, open moorland interspersed with small villages in the valleys of the rivers Hamps and Manifold. The railways had bypassed such areas as being uneconomic to build into but with the passing of the Light Railways Act 1896 the way was opened for railways to be constructed in rural areas at cheaper cost and with the possibility of financial support from the Treasury. Even as the Light Railways Act was progressing through Parliament a committee was formed in Leek to promote a light railway from Leek to Hartington in Dovedale, Derbyshire. In order to access Treasury funds the line had to be constructed and operated by an existing railway company and as the NSR had a monopoly on rail traffic in the area, the committee entered into discussion with the NSR board in August 1896. The NSR were not only interested in the traffic to be generated from the area but also because it saw the advantage in using a line under the Light Railways Act 1896 as a means of building a standard gauge line to the quarries at Caldon Low. The NSR operated the quarry under a 999-year lease and exported limestone from the quarry via a 3 ft 6 in (1,067 mm) narrow gauge railway from the quarry to the NSR station at Kingsley and Froghall and as the quarry expanded this was not the most efficient method of moving the stone.

As the main objective of the NSR was to improve its mineral traffic from Caldon Low, the company did not view a link with Leek as a high priority and for a considerable time there was disagreement between the railway company, the promoters of the LMVLR and the people of Leek over whether to build a direct route from Leek to Waterhouses (the Leek curve), as the people of Leek wanted, or solely to build a curve away from Leek towards Stoke, as the railway company wanted. It took two years for the light railway order to be approved and the single line branch was not authorised until 1 March 1899 by the Leek, Caldon Low, and Hartington Light Railways Order 1898. This order did not include the Leek curve at Leek Brook, and it took a further act of Parliament, the North Staffordshire Railway Act 1899 (62 & 63 Vict. c.ccxxxi) to give the NSR the authority to build the Leek curve.

== Construction ==
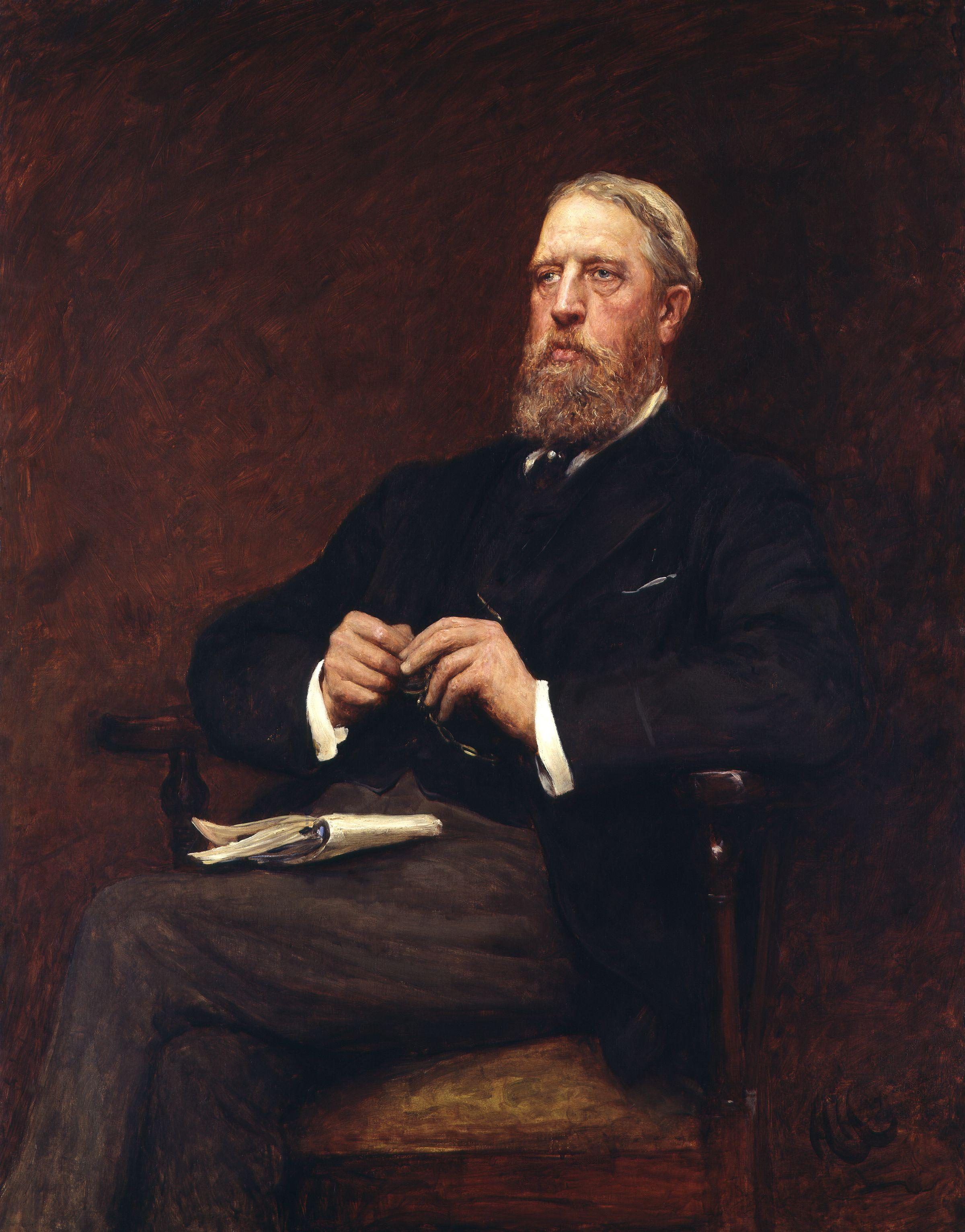
Spencer Cavendish, 8th Duke of Devonshire who performed the ceremonial sod-cutting in October 1899

The light railway order authorised the construction of four lines:

1. the line from Leek Brook junction to Caldon (length 8 miles 11.4 chains (13.1 km))
2. the line from Caldon into Caldon Low quarry (length 48.5 chains (1.0 km))
3. the line from Caldon to Waterhouses (length 1 mile 19.8 chains (2.0 km))
4. the LMVLR (length 7 miles 27 chains (11.8 km))

Very soon after the passing of the order the ceremonial sod-cutting took place and was conducted by the 8th Duke of Devonshire on 3 October 1899 at Waterhouses.

Surveying, planning and purchasing the land took two years and tenders for construction were not issued until 1901. There were a number of bidders but eventually all the tenders were granted to when the tenders were let to Hutchinson and Co of Embsay, Yorkshire.

Although the tenders called for completion of the branch by 1904 it was a year later before it was completed (the LMVLR had been completed on time in 1904) and it was apparent that there had been some significant under-estimation of the amount of earthworks needed; the original estimate was that the 9 miles 79 chains (16.1 km) of the Waterhouse and quarry lines would require the excavation of 775,000 cubic yards (593,000 m^{3}), in fact over 1,500,000 cubic yards (1,100,000 m^{3}) was finally excavated. The line was severely graded and also included the highest point on the NSR with a summit between Ipstones and Winkhill Halt at 1,063 feet (324 m).

Approval for opening from the Railway Inspectorate was granted in May 1905 and the line opened, initially to Ipstones, on 5 June 1905 and then on to Caldon Low quarry and Waterhouses on 1 July 1905.

== Passenger services ==
=== North Staffordshire Railway ===
Scheduled passenger services were never intensive. Initially three trains each weekday ran between Leek and Waterhouses with no Sunday service but with additional trains on Saturdays (a market day in Leek). A limited Sunday service was later introduced and by the outbreak of the First World War this pattern had become the norm. As a wartime measure, first class was withdrawn in 1918. After the war the service was downgraded even more, and by the end of the NSR period there were only two trains each way per day with one train each way on Sunday and an extra train each way on Wednesdays and Saturdays.

Excursion traffic was intermittent, through excursions direct from Stoke-on-Trent on Thursdays and weekends were a regular feature until the First World War but did not resume afterwards.

=== London, Midland and Scottish Railway ===
Under the 1923 Grouping the NSR became part of the London, Midland and Scottish Railway (LMS). For the Waterhouses line this meant little change in the early days, but soon Sunday trains were discontinued and the extra Wednesday service to serve Leek market day was withdrawn. The LMVLR closed in 1934 and the following year all passenger services over the line were withdrawn.

== Freight traffic ==
=== Milk ===
The transport of milk and other produce from the farms of the Staffordshire Moorlands district was one of the prime reasons the line had been proposed by the Light Railway Committee. From the opening of the line, the transport of milk was a significant contributor to the finances of the line. Although much of the milk went to local destinations, the bulk of it went further afield and special milk trains ran from the branch to London for several years after the First World War. The closure of the creamery at Ecton in 1932 resulted in a reorganisation by the dairy companies of the collection of milk in the district which led to the milk traffic being diverted away from the LMVLR and the Waterhouses branch which was a major factor in the decision to close the LMVLR in 1934.

=== Other freight ===
The carriage of other freight and general merchandise never met the levels the promoters of the line anticipated and one or two trains per day were sufficient to meet the demand. After the withdrawal of the passenger services in 1935, freight traffic continued until 1964 when the goods facilities at Bradnop, Ipstones and Winkhill were withdrawn.

=== Mineral traffic ===
The transport of limestone mineral traffic from Caldon Low quarries was the main interest of the NSR in constructing the line as the company were the leaseholders of the quarry. Daily services ran from the earliest days and reached a peak of 4 trains per day in 1927, but the economic depression of the 1930s affected the fortunes of Caldon Low quarry and the traffic had dropped to only one train per day in 1940. After the end of the Second World War there was an increase in traffic and limestone continued to be moved by train from Caldon Low until 1988.

== Resurgence ==
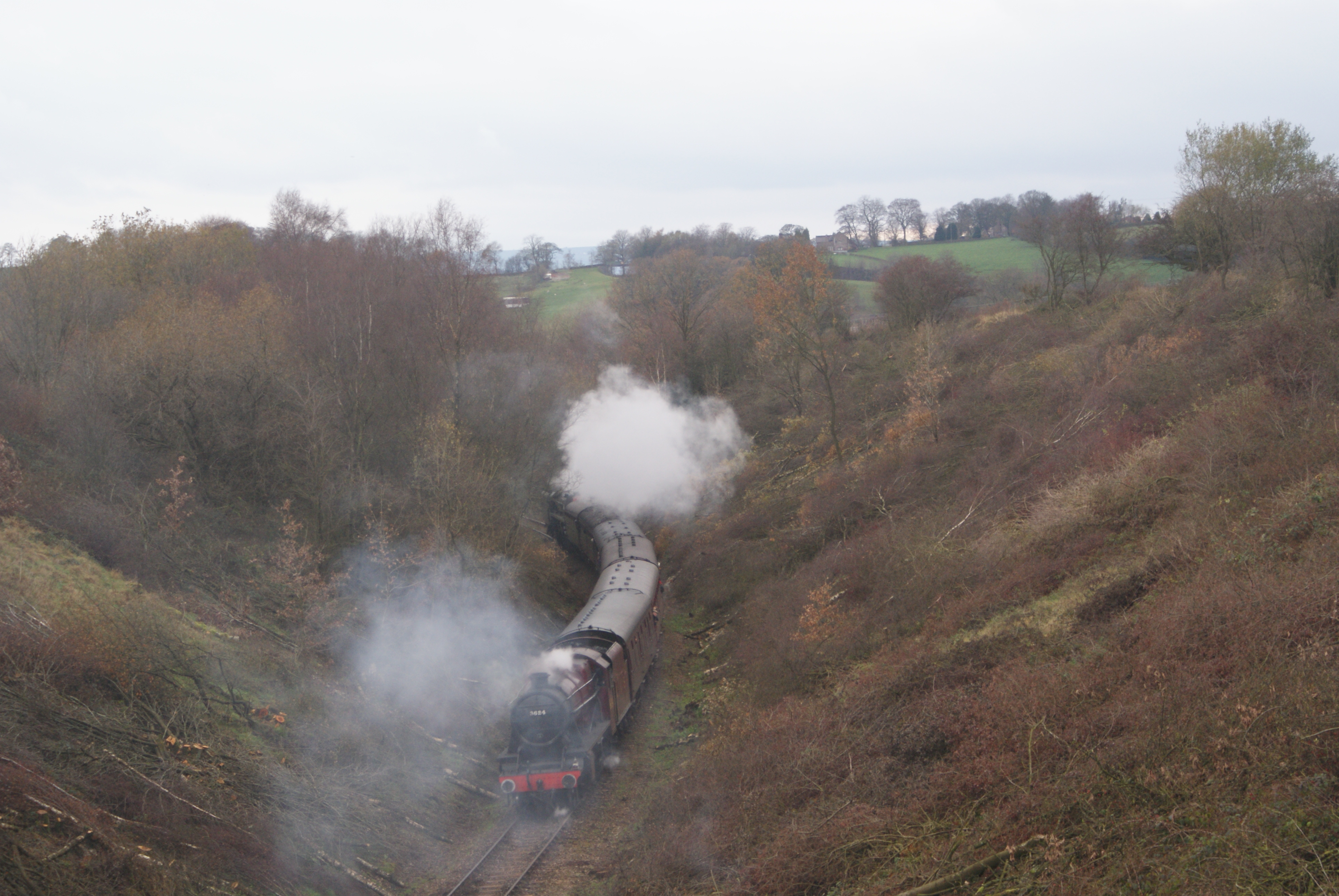
Churnet Valley Railway train on the branch line near Bradnop on the first weekend of running over the line in 2010

With the end of limestone traffic in 1988 the line went out of use, but was designated as a strategic freight site. In 2009 Moorland and City Railways (MCR) obtained the line on a 150 year lease from Network Rail with the intention of reopening the line for quarry traffic. Lafarge and Tarmac merged their assets in 2013 with the cement works and quarry becoming one operation. Holcim merged with Lafarge in 2015 and Holcim Group became sole owners. Plans for reopening the line for quarry traffic were on hold. The quarries were later acquired by Aggregate Industries with rail transport not decided.

The local heritage railway, the Churnet Valley Railway (CVR), who already operate the line between Leek Brook and Kingsley and Froghall arranged access over the branch line with Moorland and City Railways and in 2011 started operating trains to Caldon Low exchange sidings. In 2014 MCR started the process to upgrade the track, as the condition of the track would not support modern freight engines and rolling stock, and so the rails were lifted between Ipstones and Caldon Low quarry with the intention of relaying with new track once the situation over the quarry was known.

In 2014 CVR started raising funds to purchase the trackwork between Leek Brook and Ipstones, in order to ensure their operations were not affected by the ongoing uncertainty over the quarry project.

By October 2020 CVR had purchased the line from MCR and most trains now terminate at Ipstones.
